= List of play-by-mail games =

Play-by-mail game The Land of Karrus, as portrayed in Paper Mayhem magazine

This is a list of play-by-mail (PBM) games. It includes games played only by postal mail, those played by mail with a play-by-email (PBEM) option, and games played in a turn-based format only by email or other digital format.

It is unclear what the earliest play-by mail game is between chess and Go. Diplomacy was first played by mail in 1963. In the early 1970s, in the United States, Rick Loomis of Flying Buffalo Inc, began a number of play-by-mail games; this included games such as Nuclear Destruction (1970). This marked the beginning of the professional PBM industry. Other publishers followed suit, with significant expansion across the industry in the 1980s. (Note: Some PBM game publishers as of 1987 included: 4Sight, Acme Game Moderators, Advanced Gaming Enterprises, Advanced Gaming Systems, Advent Games, Adventure Systems, Adventures By Mail, Adventures Design Group, Ardon Games, Angel Simulations, Applied Gaming Technologies, Arden Enterprises, Armageddon Games, Arms & Alliances, Athena Games, Atlantrix, Australian Wizard (AUS), Avatar Games, Balrog Adventures (UK), Rick Barr, Beach, David, Big City, Bizarre PBM, The Blue Rhino, The Boot Heel, Brainard Enterprises, Breakout (AUS), Richard Breton, C-Mind Enterprises, C-T Simulators, Central Texas Computing, Chameleon Games (AUS), Clemens & Associates, The Colonies, Comstar Enterprises, Conflict Interaction Associates, The Conquest (UK), Correlated Services, Mark Coulshed, Mark (UK), D2 Report, Davis Publications, Inc., DeMark Enterprises, Designs by Lizeau, Diadem Enterprises, Different Worlds, Dragon Magazine, Dragonlords, Eagle Gaming, Empire Games, Emprise Game Systems, Entertainment Concepts, Inc., The European Journal, Fantastic Simulations, Fauchard Enterprises, Final Frontier, Flagship (UK), Flagship (US), Flying Buffalo Inc., Frontier Games, Future Combat Simulations, Galactic Enterprises, Galactic Simulations, The Game Anvil, Game Masters International, Game Systems Inc., Garners Unlimited, The Gamesmiths, Gaming Universal, Gemini Systems, Inc., Genji Games, Graff Simulations, Grandel, Inc. The Guide to PBM, H&R Enterprises, Horizon International, Inc., Iberian Inquirer, Iberian Rag, Integral Games, Intergalactic Games, ICBM (UK), J&J Combat Simulations, Jabberwock Enterprises, Inc., Juggernaut, JF&L, K&C Enterprises, Kelstar Enterprises, King Dragon Productions, K&C Inc., KJC Games (UK), KSK Concepts, KTH Games, Dan Larnbert, Lanke, Roland Lee (CAN), London Gazette, London Times, Lorewarden Garnes (UK), LAMA, The Mailbox, Bob McLain, Midnight Games, Mindgate, Missing Tiger (AUS), Mitre Garnes (UK), Mobius Corporation, Neolithic Enterprises, NB Software, Outremer Garnes, Oyssean War Games, OM Games (AUS), Palace Simulations, Paper Generals, Nicky Palmer (UK), Paper Mayhem, Pegasus Productions, PF Games (UK), Pierce and Co, PBM, Play By Mail Association, Phoenix Publications, The PBM Company, Quest Computer Services, Quest Games, Reality Simulations, Rebel Enterprises, Renaissance, Renaissance Times, Rhiannon Enterprises, Roblagon, Rolling Thunder Games, Rostherne Games (UK), The Round Table, Schubel & Son, Mark Schoonover, Sloth Enterprises (UK), Squibb, G. C. (UK), Sorcerer's Apprentice, Space Heroes, Spellbinder Games (UK), Spelbinder Games (US), Tim Sullivan, Star Publishing Co., Stardragon, Starweb Update, Stat-Sports, Superior Simulations, Supernova Games, SMG Games, TL Designs, The Talisman, Time Patterns (UK), Time-Space Simulations, The Times, Top Down Development, Top Twenty Football, Total Simulations, Inc., Triumph Game Systems, Tudor Games, Tundra Games (CAN), Twin Engine Gaming, Ultimate Empires, Inc., Vance Upshaw, Vengeance Games (UK), Vigard Simulations, Viking Games, Inc., VIP of Gaming, Voice of Islam and India, Vorcon Games (UK), Wargamers Information, White Lion Enterprises, Who Dunnits, Mike Williams, Odie Williams, World Campaigns, Constantine Xanthos, Karl Zeimetz, and Zorph Enterprises. Flagship added to this list at the same time timeframe, combining publishers noted in their issues 1–13: Argonaut Publishing, ECI, LAMA, Palace Simulations, and Star Dragon of the United States; The First Conquest, DMC Games, Golden Sherd Games, Harrow Postal Games, Historical Engineering, Jade Games, Ki-Rin Games, Legend Inc. Ltd, Maim Games, NAB Software, Nine Worlds Enterprises, Orion Games, Ben Parkinson, PTF Games, Rampage Games, Soulsucker Games, Spellbinder Games, G.C. Squibb, Waverly Games, and Zorn Games from the United Kingdom.) This supported the publication of a number of newsletters from individual play-by-mail companies as well as independent publications such as Gaming Universal, Paper Mayhem, and Flagship which focused solely on the play-by-mail gaming industry. The sourcing of play-by-mail games in this list largely comes from these magazines, whether from reviews or advertisements, as well as additional magazines such as Space Gamer/Fantasy Gamer, Dragon Magazine, and other publications that serviced the gaming community broadly, resuming with the contemporary online magazine Suspense and Decision, which supported the small but active play-by-mail gaming community into the 2020s.

In some cases, more than one publisher can be found for the same game on the list. The rights to play-by-mail games were occasionally sold among publishers. (Note: For example, in 1993, play-by-mail gaming company Schubel & Son sold all games and licenses to Northwest Simulations.) Additionally, a publishing company might license a game to a company which would offer it for play in another country. (Note: For example, in the March/April 1993 issue of Paper Mayhem magazine, Prime Time Simulations announced that its play-by-mail game World Conquest was licensed to multiple companies in Europe and was available in English, French, German, Dutch, and Italian.) Many more play-by-mail games existed in nascent, playtest form. Only games which completed playtesting and were published for play are included here. This list includes games which are still active and those no longer available for play. Game durations range from those briefly available for play, such as Quest of Gorr, to those which have been played for decades or longer, such as Alamaze, Diplomacy, Hyborian War, and Chess.

== Active play-by-mail games ==
List
Game	Released	Publisher	Associate(s)	Ref.
2300 A.D. – The Great Game			Kevin Soice	
Adventurer Kings	1992	Epistoludisme & Cie	Roland Danard	
Aeterna Roma	Circa 2019 to present			
Alamaze	1986	Alamaze.co		
A New Dawn (PBEM)			Nicholas Vitek	
Ancient Empires			Artyom Trityak	
Atlantis: New Origins			Artyom Trityak	
Austerlitz		Supersonic Games		
Australian Empires		Ab Initio Games		
Battle Plan	1972	Rick Loomis PBM Games	Rick Loomis	
Clash of Legends	2006			
Company Commander	1980s	Jason Oates Games (previously Escape from Reality and Schubel & Son)		
Continental Rails II	1999	Epistoludisme & Cie	Graaf Simulations, Roland Danard	
Covert Operations		Rick Loomis PBM Games	Charles Gaydos (designer)	
The Crack of Doom II		Advanced Gaming Enterprises		
Cruenti Dei		Sardarthion Press		
Dark Age		Ab Initio Games & Software Simulations		
Diplomacy	1959	Games Research Inc	Allan B. Calhamer	
Drakensang Online		Bigpoint Games		
Duel II (Originally Duelmasters)	1984	Reality Simulations Inc		
DungeonWorld Adventures (previously Dungeon)		Madhouse Interactive Entertainment	Steve Tierney (Game Master)	
DungeonWorld Estates		Madhouse Interactive Entertainment		
Elenlond				
Empires		Ab Initio Games & Software Simulations		
European Empires		Ab Initio Games		
En Garde!		Margam Evans		
Eressea		Enno Rehling		
Extra Time		KJC Games		
Fallen Empires	March 2013		Peter and James Perrin	
Forgotten Realms		Reality Simulations		
Feudal Lords	1982	Rick Loomis PBM Games		
Galac-Tac	1982	Talisman Games		
Galactic Conflict	1982	Rick Loomis PBM Games		
Gameplan		Ab Initio Games & Software Simulations		
Gameplan Baseball		Ab Initio Games & Software Simulations		
The Glory of Kings VII		Agema		
God of War: A Call from the Wilds	2018	Santa Monica Studio, Facebook, Inc.		
Gridiron Stats		Ab Initio Games & Software Simulations		
Heroic Fantasy	1982	Rick Loomis PBM Games		
Hoopplan		Ab Initio Games & Software Simulations		
Hyborian War	1985	Reality Simulations Inc.	Edward Schoonover	
Ilkor: Dark Rising	2011 or prior	Gad Games	Sean Cleworth	
Imaginary Wrestling Association		Ab Initio Games & Software Simulations		
The Isles: The Game of Outcasts	1987	Roy Pollard playbymail.uk		
It's a Crime	September 1985	KJC Games		
Jump-Point	2023	Talisman Consulting	Jon Capps	
Kickabout	1987	Spellbinder Games	Chris Dempsey	
Lands of Nevron		Ian Affleck		
Legends		Harlequin Games		
Lords of the Earth	1983	Thomas Harlan		
Middle-earth: Third Age; Circa 1650		Game Systems International		
Middle-earth: Kin-Strife; Circa 1450		Game Systems International		
Middle-earth: Fourth Age; Circa 1000		Game Systems International		
Midgard	1984	Time Space Simulations, Midgames, Midguard USA, Talisman Consulting		
Mobius I	1984	Rick Loomis PBM Games		
Monster Island	1989	KJC Games	Jack B. Everitt (designer)	
Nuclear Destruction	1970	Rick Loomis PBM Games	Rick Loomis (Designer)	
Phoenix: Beyond the Stellar Empire	Early 1980s	KJC Games		
Play On		Ab Initio Games & Software Simulations		
Puma [UK-based PBM/PBeM]	1988	Pete Burrows [Buzzwack PBM]	Pete Burrows	
Quest		KJC Games		
Quest of the Great Jewels (PBEM)	Early 1980s	Jeffrey McKee		
Raceplan		Ab Initio Games & Software Simulations		
Regime Change		Agema		
Renaissance	1981	Constantine Xanthos		
Rensim	2014	Constantine Xanthos		
Riftlords	1995	Rick Loomis PBM Games		
Rome is Burning		AGEMA		
Run Chase		Ab Initio Games & Software Simulations		
Scramble for Empire		Agema		
Slapshot		Ab Initio Games & Software Simulations		
Soccer Star (PBEM)	1986	Trident Games		
Soccer Stats		Ab Initio Games		
Spaceplan		Ab Initio Games & Software Simulations		
Star Chase		Ab Initio Games & Software Simulations		
Star Fleet Warlord		Franz Games	Paul Franz	
Starweb	1976	Rick Loomis PBM Games (previously Flying Buffalo, Inc. and ICBM (UK))		
Stellar Conflict		Morten Larsen		
Summit PBM		Summit Soccer		
SuperNova: Rise of the Empire (PBEM)	2003	Rolling Thunder Games	Pete Dorman (Game Master)	
Swashbuckler (PBEM)		Agema		
Takamo	November 15, 1983	Advent Games		
Throne of Cofain (PBEM)		Morten Larsen		
TribeNet	PBM in mid 1980s; PBEM from 1997	Tribenet.com.au	Peter Rzechorzek (Game Master)	
Victory! The Battle for Europe (PBEM)	1991	Rolling Thunder Games		
War of the Dark God		Morten Larsen		
World Wide Battle Plan		Rick Loomis PBM Games		

== Inactive U.S. play-by-mail games ==
List
Game (Note: Games include those that moved past playtesting and were introduced to the market as paid games with players)	Released	Publisher (Note: Publishers occasionally changed for play-by-mail games when companies bought the rights to games or licensed games from the original publishers. Publishers noted in this list are as of the date of the reference cited.)	Associate(s)	Ref.
1483 Online		Guild of Blades		
1776			David Kohls	
1939 World Wide Battleplan		Flying Buffalo Inc		
2 Halves		Nova Games		
2300 A.D. – The Great Game				
24 The RPG				
2nd Ed AD&D game: Sacred Scrolls campaign		1980s		
5th Tier		DFS Productions		
A Bledian Diary		Spellbinder Games		
A&D Soccer		A&D Entertainment		
Absolute Fantasy		Silver Dreamer		
Absolute Power				
Absolute Power II		Silver Dreamer		
Absolute Heroes		Jade Enterprises		
Abyss		Zephyr Enterprises, Inc.		
A Call to Duty				
A Duel of a Different Color		Fractal Dimensions		
Advanced Squad Leader				
Ad Astra		Superior Simulations		
Advanced Dungeons & Dragons		ECI		
Adventurers Guild		Entertainment Plus More Games		
Adventures in Parlan		DeMark Enterprises		
Aeolian Harp		The Talisman		
Aegyptus	1984	World Campaigns		
Aeroball		Mark Wightman		
AEs		Legends		
A Frontier Explained			Sam Hoobler	
Aftermath 2150		Centurion Game Company		
After the Fall of Night		Gateway Games		
The Afterworld		Sci Fi Simulations		
Against All Odds (AAO)		C2 Simulations		
Agamemnon		Kelem Games		
Agamemnon II		Kelem Games		
Age of Discovery		E-Mail Games		
Age of Imperialism		Allen Kimball		
Age of Gold		Nevanis Games		
Age of Heroes				
Agora Nomic	Started June 1993			
A Hell of a Ride			Cordelia Chase	
Ah-Cult			Bruce Kroeze	
Alien Conflict	1983	Schubel & Son		
Alien Conquest		Redgod Enterprises		
Alien Destiny		AMM Enterprises		
Alien Empires		Horizon Games		
Alien Invasion		Schubel & Son		
Alphabet City	Circa 2000s			
Alphasim Hocket Simulation (formerly World Electronic Hockey League)	Circa 2000s			
Amaranth		Harlequin Games		
American Civil War Battles				
American War of Independence Battles				
An Afrikan Adventure		Tom Webster		
A National Will		Simcoarum Systems		
Ancient Battles				
Ancient Campaigns		Viking Games		
Ancient Empires		Patrick Price, Schubel & Son, licensed to Walters Associates of Mississippi.		
Android Arena		Adventure Simulation Games		
The Andromeda Cluster		Micro Software Design		
A New World				
Angrelmar: The Court of Kings	1981	Ray Estabrook	Ray Estabrook (Designer and Publisher)	
Antagony		Jester Games & Hobbies		
A Paladin in Hell ... and Beyond				
Apocalypse: Survival After Armageddon		Eckert Gaming Group		
The Apoch		Spellbinder II		
Arcane Challenge		Simulation Technologies		
Archella		Leisure Time Unlimited		
Archmage		Shadow Island Games		
Arden		Arden Enterprises		
Arena		Shadow Island Games		
Arena Combat		Schubel & Son	Duane Wilcoxson (Designer)	
Arena of Doom RPG PbA	Circa 2010s			
Armed Forces Commander		Anarchy by Mail		
Armageddon – The Last War		Rick Barr		
Armageddon's Aftermath		Damien Games		
Armorclads	August 1991	DVS Productions		
Arms & Alliances		Arms & Alliances		
Artemis Fowl- The Battle Begins	Circa 2010s			
Ascension to Empire		Maverick Games		
The Ashes of Empire				
Aspects of Might		Silver Dreamer		
The Assassin's Quest	1980	De Jager & Co		
The Asteroid Game	1973	Harry J. Riley		
A Stitch in Time		Huscarl Hobbies		
Atlantic Conflict		Advent Games		
Atlantean Realm				
Atlantis		Juan Varein		
Atlantis 3.0	1996	Merry Prankster Games	Geoff Dunbar	
Atlantrix	1988 or earlier	Battle-Magic Gaming	Mike Mayeau	
Austerlitz		TBA Games (later Supersonic Games), and licensed by Quirxel Games (Germany), Sphinx (Spain), and SSV (Austria)		
Autoduel		Prometheus Games		
Banana Republic		Head Games		
Barony of the Rivers		Adam Hill		
Baron PBM		Smokey Mountain Strategies		
Baroque		The Game Anvil		
Baseball Fan-tastic		Baseball Fan-tastic		
Battle Cry		Post Age Games		
Battlefield Europe				
Battleground				
Battle of the Planets		GAD Games		
Battle Lords		Creative Keys		
Battle of Gettysburg		Norman Conquest Games		
Battle of Midway		Norman Conquest Games		
Battle of the Gods		Integral Games		
Battle Metal		Shrewd Expanse		
Battle Robots		Galactic Society Four		
BattleTech Mercenaries	Circa 2010s			
Beer Mogul		Red Mohawk		
Belter		Classified Information		
Beyond the Quadra Zone		Quest Games Inc		
Beyond the Sea of Venom		Jester Games & Hobbies		
Beyond the Stellar Empire		Adventures By Mail		
Beyond the Stellar Empire: The New System		Adventures By Mail		
Big League Franchise Owner		Horizon International, Inc.		
Black Ice	Started and ended in ~1997 (short-lived)	Horizon Games		
Bladequest		Horizon International, Inc.		
Blasted Earth		Precedence		
Bliss		R3		
Blitzkrieg		Phildee Enterprises		
Blood Ball				
Blood Pit		Emprise Game Systems		
Blood, Guts & Gore Across the Galaxy		Deltax Gaming		
Bloody Blade		Damien Games		
Board of Directors		Flying Buffalo, Inc.		
Boom Town		CompuServe		
Bones Castle		M.T. Lunsford, moderated in D2 Report		
Borderlands: Federation and Empire	1993 to 2010s			
The Borderlands of Khataj		Mailed Gauntlets		
Bounty Hunter		Creative Management Services		
Boys of Summer		Blue Panther Enterprises		
British Wrestling Association		Daniel Turner		
The Broken Lands				
Bron	1984	Otto Schmidt II		
Brotherhood	1973	Tom Webster		
Buck Rogers: Conquest of the 25th Century	1990	TSR	Design: Bruce Nesmith	
Button Men Web Game		Cheapass Games		
C++ Robots	1990s			
Capes and Criminals				
Capitol	1983	Adventures by Mail		
Captains of the Empire		Interface Software		
Captain's War		Norman Conquest War		
Caravans of Pan Geos	Early 1984	Galactic Empires	Daniel Pierce (Gamemaster)	
Cartel		Diverse Talents, Inc.		
Castle War	1986	Mialdian Press		
Catacombs of Chaos		Schubel & Son	Duane Wilcoxson (Designer)	
Celestrek II		Clemens & Associates, Inc.		
Celevor		Steven Chabotte		
The Centre Cannot Hold		Undying King Games		
Centre-Earth		Giles Bartram		
Centurion		Fantasy Workshop		
Championship Football		Hemsoft Computer Consultants		
Chaos Trail		Simon Williams		
Championship League		Supersonic Games		
Charioteers	1989	Daurada Games		
The Chevian Chronicles		Shadow Island Games		
Chicken Run		Received Wisdom		
Children/Morning Star				
The Chronicles of the Time Warp				
Circus Maximus				
Civil War		Third Wave Simulations		
Civil War in the Exiled Nations		Tom Webster		
City of Milanas		Jagg Productions	1997	
City State		Sigma Games		
The Clans of Trove		Yellowseed Games		
Clans II		Hightreet Internet Ltd		
Clansmen		Parlos Games	Mark Palin	
Clovenshield		Clovenshield		
Cluster		Capitol Consulting//VRL, Inc.	Robert Hayes (creator)	
Cluster Lords		Palace Simulations		
Cluster Wars				
Coliseum		Sovereign Games		
The Colonies		The Colonies		
Combat		Dynamic Games		
Company Commander Campaign		Tom Webster		
Computer Boxing		Schubel & Son		
Computer Sports Connoisseurs		Computer Sports Connoisseurs		
Conclave		Undying King Games		
Conflict 2000		Sinbad's Games		
Conquest	1989	Earnshaw Enterprises		
Conquest of the 25th Century		TSR, Inc.		
Conquest of the Stars	1986	Schubel & Son		
Conquest of Insula II		Clemens & Associates		
Conquest of Parlan		DeMark Enterprises		
Conquest & Crusades		Damien Games		
Conquest & Destiny				
Conquest by Millions		Scott Bowyer		
Continental Rails		Graaf Simulations		
Continental Conquest		Agents of Gaming		
Continuum		Zephyr Enterprises Inc, MBT Games	Edward Baily (Moderator, MBT Games)	
Corporation		Undying King Games		
Chess	c. 6th century			
Cosa Nostra		Yellowseed Games		
Cosmic Crusaders		Genesis Games Design		
Cosmic Dominion		Galactic Simulations		
Coup d'état		Sinbad's Games		
Counter-Terrorist		Eckert Gaming Group		
Court of Kings		The Round Table		
Covert Operations		Flying Buffalo Inc		
Crack of Doom		Advanced Gaming Enterprises	Duane Wilconxson and Debbie Leonard	
Crack of Doom II		Advanced Gaming Enterprises	Duane Wilconxson and Debbie Leonard	
Crastini Venient	2015			
Crater War		Jabberwock Enterprises		
Cricket Manager		Jeff Perkins		
Crime Lords	1981	Gamers Unlimited		
Crisis (CRISIS)		Rick Barr		
Crisis in the West				
Crownless Earth		KRS Fantasy Worlds		
Crusade		Ed Bailey		
Crystal Island		Saul Betesh		
CSC Fantasy Baseball		Computer Sports Connoisseurs		
CTF 2187		Advanced Gaming Enterprises		
Crusade		Schubel & Son, licensed to Walters Associates of Mississippi.		
Custom PBM (Note: Fully-customizable game where players could choose their genre, setting, character, etc.)		Griffon Systems		
CWA Wrestling		KTH		
CWITEN		Tom Webster		
Cyberfringe		Marguerite Dias		
Cyber-Toons	1997	Rebel Games		
Cyborg	1981	Integral Games		
Dark Age		HCS Games		
Dark Blades		Adventure Simulation Games		
Dark Magus		Dark Magus Productions		
Dark Horizons X-Men RPG	2000s			
Dark Marauders RPG	2010s			
Dark Motives	2010s			
Darkness of Silverfall		Coconut Council Inc		
Dark Star		Circle Games		
Darkworld		Rebel Enterprises		
Dawn of the Ancients	1984	GSI Game Systems Inc		
Dead Men Tell No Tales	2010s			
Death & Sorrow		Eckert Gaming Group		
Death By Starlight		Twin Engine Gaming		
Deathlands 2147	2010s			
Deathsgate		Entertainment Plus More, Inc.		
C		Waveney Games		
Department 5		JF&L		
Destiny		Blue Panther Enterprises		
Detective		Tudor Games		
Diaspora		Norman Conquest Games		
Dino Wars		Coconut Council, Inc.		
Disastria		Utter Drivel		
Doctor Who: The RPG	2000s			
Domination		LAMA		
Doommaze		Rick Barr		
The Double		Pagoda Games		
Down in Flames	1973	Lane G. Marinello		
Dragonborn				
Dragonfun	1985	Dragonquest		
Dragonian Worlds		Saul Betesh		
DragonQuest				
Dragonskeep (Crystal Island and Lost Mines modules)		Saul Betesh		
Dread Wolf	2010s			
Dreamland	2010s			
DROIDS		NoGate Consulting		
DSX Proteus	2000s			
Dukes of Hell		Software Doctors		
Dune: Wheels Within Wheels	2000s			
Dungeoneer PBEM	2000s			
Dunkerque – 1940	Active in 1973	Simulations Design Corps		
Eagle Day: The Battle for Britain		War College Simulations PBM Inc		
Earthwars		Software Doctors		
Earthwood		Game Systems Inc/KJC Games		
Earthwood (Sea Kings)		Game Systems Inc		
Eclipse		Midnight Games	James Landes (Owner/Moderator)	
EFIFA		EFIFA		
EG!: Banana				
EG!: Blarpo		Blarpo		
EG!: Dangerous Liaisons		Jerry Spencer		
EG!: Delon		Richard Crofts		
EG!: Horseguards		Trevor Gillard		
EG!: Orc		Aramaro Adrian		
EG!: Orleans				
EG!: Slumbers		Brian Jenkins		
EG!: Star		Pete Cooney		
EG!: Time of Honor		Quincy Cooper		
Eidolon				
EIWF		Create A World, Inc.		
El Conquistador				
Elderon	2006			
Eldritch		Play-by-Electron Games		
Election Year		Flying Buffalo Inc		
Electronic Mail American Civil War		ImagiCom, Inc.		
El Mythico		Graaf Simulations		
Emberverse PBEM	2000s			
Emperor of Space				
Empire		H&R Enterprises		
Empire Builders				
Empires of Corinium		Viking Games		
Empire of the Gonzo Galaxy or EGG	1981	Tom Webster		
Empyrean Challenge	1978	Superior Simulations		
Empires for Rent		Blue Panther Enterprises		
Empires in Space		Bob Stribula		
Endless Time, Endless Space		Games Design Corporation		
English Civil War Battles				
Enter the Blood Pit		Affairs of Honor		
Epic (play-by-mail game)		Midnight Games	James Landes (Owner/Moderator)	
Epic Game II	August 1986	Midnight Games	James Landes (Owner/Moderator)	
Epic III		Midnight Games		
Epoch of Might		John Hanson		
Epsom		David Scriven		
Essentially Racing		Essentially Racing		
Europa		Undying King Games		
European Conflict	1997	Conflict Productions	John Roberts	
EverMoor		Games Adventure		
Evermoor II		Bronze Star Gaming		
Exile		Harlequin Games		
Exodus		Grenade Games		
Fall of Rome		Enlightened Age Entertainment		
Fall of the Roman Empire		Jason Oates		
Fallen at the First		Jason Oates		
Family Wars		Andon Games, Cyclops Gaming		
The Fantasy Arena				
Fantasy Basketball		Fantasy Basketball		
Fantasy Nations		Roaming Panther Gaming Co.		
Fantasy Congress	2000s			
Fantasy Cycling 2001		Ultra Sports		
Far Horizons: The Awakening				
Federation Sim Fleet	March 7, 1993			
Feudal Lords II		Graaf Simulations		
Fields of Nephlim		Fields of Nephlim		
Fight for Gold				
The Final Campaign	July 1, 1989	Blue Panther Enterprises		
Final Frontier		Gator Concepts		
Finmax		Advanced Gaming Systems		
Fire in the Galaxy	1990s	Sar-a-Kan Games; Tactical Simulations, Inc. (1998 release)		
Firebreather		Horizon Games		
Firing Squad		JEM Software, Inc.		
The First Crusade		Kelem Games		
First Light	1984	C-Mind Enterprises	Chris Carrier	(Note: C-Mind Enterprises notified Paper Mayhem magazine for its Jan–Feb 1985 issue that First Light was designed and tested in 1984 and C-Mind Enterprises was registered as a sole proprietorship in California on Jun 7, 1985.)
First World	August 1984	White Lion Enterprises	John and Mike O'Brien	
Fleet Maneuvers		Fantastic Simulations		
Floodlit Soccer				
Fog of War		Schubel & Son		
Food Chain	1990s	Greg Lindahl		
Football Maestro		Maestro Games		
Formula 1 Grand Prix Racing	Ended 1997		Stephen R. White	
Freak Out		Guy M. Games		
Freedom		Simcoarum Systems		
Furoic Age		Starfield Games		
Galactic Twilight 2050		Create A World, Inc.		
Gameplan		Graaf Simulations, licensed to Sloth Enterprises (UK)		
Gameplan II				
Gamma 39	2000s			
Galactic Anarchy		Anarchy by Mail		
Galactic Confusion		Pierce & Co.		
Galactic Empires		Galactic Empires		
Galactic Gambit		Bard Interactive Games, Inc.		
The Galactic Game	1974 to 1981 (Original version)	Galactic Society Four		
Galactic Imperium		Simulations Unlimited (until 1984 when acquired by Emprise Game Systems)		
Galactic Invasion				
Galactic Invasion 3		Ultra Sports		
Galactic Overlord		Steven Arnott		
Galactic Power		Vigard Simulations		
Galactic Prisoners	1985	Grandel Inc		
Galactic Empires		Galactic Empires		
Galactic Pest Control		Tom Webster		
Galactic Voyage		H & H Games		
Galaxy		Rebus Games		
Galaxy: Alpha		KTH, Intergalactic Games		
Galaxy Conflict		KTH		
Galaxy II		Brett A. Tondreau		
Galaxys of Tomorrow		Joseph Teller		
Gallic Wars		Kage Interactive		
Gameplan II		Clemens & Associates		
Gameplan American Football & Soccer Strategy		Schubel & Son		
Gameplan NFL Football				
Games By Mail Football Simulation		Games By Mail		
Ganglords	1982 or earlier	Big City, Inc.	Darrel A. Plant	
Gateway to the Stars	Ended 1987	Total Simulations, Inc. (closed 1987)		
Ghoulies Ghosties and Beasties	2010s			
Gladiator: The Legacy of Heraklês		Dragon Games		
Gladiators of Death		Fantasy & Futuristic Simulations		
Global Conquest		Keith Langley		
Global Diplomacy		E-Mail Games		
Global Supremacy		Schubel & Son		
Global Supremacy III		Schubel & Son		
Glofeyne				
Glory		HCS Games		
Glory II		HCS Games		
Glory to the Lance		Nova Games		
Gobbal				
The Godfather	circa 1986	The Play By Mail Company		
Godfather	1989	Phildee Enterprises		
The Godfather of Astini		Godfather Games		
Godling: Quest for the Realm		Mouchet Software Corporation		
Golden Realms II		Spellbinder II		
Gorlos		Chris Bury, World Fictional Wrestling		
Grand Alliance		Simcoarum Systems		
Gray RPG	2010s			
Great Game: 1820		Great Game		
Great White Hunter		Steven Arnott		
Gridiron Stats		Danny McConnell, Ab Initio Games		
Guardian		Stephen Richardson, Guardian Games		
Guilds of Honor	Approximately 1995			
Gunboat		Agema Publications		
Gunboat Empires				
Gunners		Rebel Games		
Guns of 14		Simcoarum Systems		
Guru Football Manager				
Half Time PBM Football		Half Time PBM Football		
Hall of Champions		Dynamic Games		
Hand of the Demon		Spellbinder II		
Harry Potter the War is On	2010s			
Haunted House	Paper Tigers, Eclipse Consulting, Inc.	Eclipse Consulting, Inc. acquired in 1995 from Paper Tigers		
Haven		Different Worlds Publications		
Heart of the West	2010s			
Heaven's Above		Spellbinder II		
Heroic Age		Games Without Frontiers		
High Kings Tourney				
Highlander		Claemor Entertainment Inc.		
High Tide	Circa 1983	Viking Games		
Hoopplan				
Hoplite Encounter				
Horizon's End!		Schubel & Son	Duane Wilcoxson (Designer)	
HorseMen		Saul Betesh		
Horse Racing				
Horses For Courses		Spellbinder II		
Hoss Soljers		Devil's Advocate Games		
The Hunt		JF&L		
Hunting		DMC Games	Dave Cooksey	
Hunting 2		DMC Games	Dave Cooksey	
HyperXpansion				
ICWF				
Illuminati PBM	Playtest complete May 1984, play began June 1984	Adventure Systems, Flying Buffalo	Draper Kauffman	
Imaginary Championship Wrestling				
Immortals		Synchronicity, Inc.		
Imperium		E-Mail Games		
Imperium Challenge		Superior Simulations		
Imperial Conquest		Armageddon Games		
Imperial Expansion		E-Mail Games		
Imperial Games		Applied Gaming Technologies Inc.		
Infinite Conflict		Gemini Systems, Inc.		
INS 20,000 BC				
INS 2001	Bob Bost (gamemaster)	International Research Associates (designer); Atomic Games (licensee)		
International Internet Football		Phildee Enterprises		
In the House Today		Games Design Corporation		
In the Navy		J&J Combat Simulations		
Into the Maelstrom		Maelstrom Games		
Into Infinity	May 1988	Battle-Magic Gaming		
Industrial Empire		Gamer's Den		
Inferno		Undying King Games		
Intrigue	June 1990	White Lion Enterprises		
IronBlood				
Iron Kings		Play-by-Electron Games		
Iron & Steam		Prime Time Programming (Midnight Games as of 1994)		
Island Takeover	Approximately 1995			
Isle of Crowns		Adventures By Mail		
Island of Kesmai				
Isolation Ending				
It's a Crime!		Adventures By Mail		
Ixion's Wheel		Undying King Games		
IWA				
IWBL		Create A World, Inc.		
Japanese Crusade		Jolly Goblin Games		
Jasta				
Jetball		Alchemist's Guild		
Joust		King's Guild, Inc.		
Jurien Range		PBM Adventures		
Kaoswars				
Kickabout		Spellbinder Games		
Kavernes		Marguerite Dias		
Keys of Medokh		Dynamic Games, Temple Games		
Killbots		Sector Games		(Note: Game was one turn long. Players designed and released a robot into combat. Winners advanced.)
Kill Ted!		Blue Panther Enterprises		
King of Kings		King of Kings		
Kingdom		Graaf Simulations		
Kingdom Quests		Chain Mail Games		
Kingdom's & Conquest		Tudor Games		
Kingdoms of Telgard		Kingdoms of Telgard		
Kings		Dragon Games, JF&L		
Kings & Castles		Athena		
Kings of Karadon		Hunky Monkey Games		
The King's Birthday		KTH		
Kingsearth		Kings Guild, Inc.		
Kings of Steel		Stephen White		
Kings of Zanthia		Phildee Enterprises		
Kings & Things*		Andon Games, Graaf Simulations, licensed to Sloth Enterprises (UK)		
Kingsearth		Kings Guild Inc		
Kings of the Boryian Empire		Paper Generals		
Kings of the Boryian Empire II		Piranha Games		
Kings War		Schubel & Son		
KLIP		Pavel Lyakhovskiy		
Knight Commander		Galactic Society Four		
Knights of Chivalry	Circa 1983	Odyssean War Games		
Kobe II		Piranha Games		
Krahlizek: The Last Battle		Aggressive Addiction Games, Inc.		
Krystarian				
The Land		Sewars		
The Land of Karrus	1990	Paper Tigers	Jean Brown (Designer/Moderator)	
LandLords	1984	Quest Computer Services		
Lands of Enchantment	1983	Joseph Teller		
L'Arene		Megalith Games		
Lawman		Megaton Enterprise		
Legends: North Island Campaign		Dragon Games		
Legends: Realm of the Immortals		Dragon Games		
Legends: the Crystal Shard		Dragon Games		
Legends of Kalei		Kalei Enterprises		
Legions of the Empire		Dymar Enterprises		
Leyenda		Cruachan Diversions		
Lizards	1994	Flying Buffalo Inc, Roma (Aus), Circle (NZ), Madhouse (UK)	Jonathan Bean (Designer)	
L&L Basketball		L&L Activities		
L&L Football		L&L Activities		
Logan's Run	Circa 1983	Knights of Chivalry		
Lomaka	1993	Paper Tigers		
Loot the Castle or LTC	1981	Tom Webster		
Lords of Aphrodite				
Lords of Europe		M&M Hobbies		
Lords of Harkanis: The Prophecy		War College Simulations, Inc.		
Lords of the Dark Horse		Adventures Design Group, Inc.		
Lord of the Land		Create A World, Inc.		
Lord of the Realm		HFR Games		
Lords of Destiny	Early 1990s	Maelstrom Games		
Lords of the Blood Sea		Godfather Games		
Lords of the Dark Horse		Adventures Design Group, Inc.		
Lords of the Earth: Campaign 1		Thomas Harlan		
Lords of the Earth: Campaign 2		Colin Dunnigan		
Lords of the Earth: Campaign 4		David Adams		
Lords of the Earth: Campaign 5		Dean Patterson		
Lords of the Earth: Campaign 7		Eddie Hartwell		
Lords of the Earth: Campaign 8		Paul Flinton		
Lords of the Earth: Campaign 10		David Adams		
Lords of the Earth: Campaign 11		Phil Baird		
Lords of the Earth: Campaign 13		Chris Cornuelle		
Lords of the Earth: Campaign 16		Steve Olson		
Lords of the Earth: Campaign 19		Steve Olson		
Lords of the Earth: Campaign 20		Eddie Efsic		
Lords of the Earth: Campaign 23		Michael Helmsing		
Lords of the Earth: Campaign 24		Lesley Nielson		
Lords of the Earth: Campaign 25		David Mattingly		
Lords of the Earth: Campaign 42		Leslie Dodd		
Lords of the Earth: Campaign 51		JJ Martel		
Lords of the Fray		Ethereal Edge Enterprises		
Lords of the Galactic Rim		Nebula Star Productions		
Lords of Valetia	1977	RB&B Design Operations		
Lost Knowledge		Compu-Caper Gaming		
LTG	1983	Tom Webster		
LT Wars		Spellbinder Games		
Mageborn		DFS Productions		
Magebor: Arena		DFS Productions		
Mall Maniacs	1987	Creative Simulations		
Magic Duel		JF&L		
Magika		ChoZen FroZen Games		
MagiQuest		Palace Simulations		
Magocracy	1986	Mialdian Press		
Mandragora: Shadows Lengthen		Nova Games		
Manifest Destiny	Early 1980s	Viking Games		
Masters of Magic		HCS Games		
Maxi-Challenge				
Mazeworld		Acme Game Moderators		
MedioEvo		The PBM Locomotive Srl		
The Mean Arena		Monica Ripsnore		
Merchant Lords		Wishful Thinking		
Merchant Princes		Desert PBM	Tim and Debbie Bremser	
MegaPrix		Adventure Simulation Games		
The Melding (Name change from World of Velgor)	1985	Kelstar Enterprises		
Mercenaries and Empires	Through Oct. 1984	Sage		(Note: Jason Bock of Sage informed Paper Mayhem Magazine that it was "forced to end all of its games" as of October 1984, including Mercenaries and Empires and Hydra.)
Mercenary		Piranha Games		
MiiSL		MiiSL, Sando Chiavuzzo		
Military Khralizek		Aggressive Addiction Games, Inc.		
Militech		Apex Games		
Miller Systems WWII Campaign	Approximately 1995			
Mind the Gap		John Hanson		
Mindgate BBS		Mindgate		
Mining Meyham		Time Patterns PBM Games		
Missouri				
MMCII				
Modern World Conquest		Prime Time Simulations		
Moon Base		Flying Buffalo, Inc.		
Monarchs		Rick Barr		
Moneylender		Rick Barr		
Monopoly		Mail Games		
Monsters		Play-by-Electron Games		
Moscow '41		Vigard Simulations		
Murania		Michael Halvis		
Murder!				
Muskets and Mules		Historical Engineering		
Mutant Wars		Cutting Edge Games		
Mystic Arena		Mystic Arena		
The Mystic Land		Create A World, Inc.		
Mysticora				
A National Will		Simcoarum Systems		
NCAA Management Game				
Necom Games				
Netrunner		Coconut Council		
New Dawn		Marguerite Dias/New Dawn		
New Order	1987	C2 Simulations	Carl Carpenter	
New World		JF&L		
The Next Empire	Origins 1988	Cyborg Games, later Reality Simulations		
The Next Empire II		Reality Simulations Inc		
The Next Frontier	1990 (v1.1 release)	Sphered Effulgent Technologies (SET)		
Nexus of Mystery		Creative Management Services		
NFL Pro League Football		Gamer's Guild		
Nguyen Hue		Vigard Simulations		
Node Warriors		Genesis Game Design		
Nuclear Threat		JF&L		
Nuclear War		Flying Buffalo, Inc.		
Odyssey: Black Piper	1998 or earlier	Lucky Llama Games		
Odyssey: Heroes' Quest	1997	KSK Concepts		
Odyssey: Only the Strong	1998 or earlier	KSK Concepts, Lucky Llama Games		
Offside Ref!		Dave Carter, Scorpiogames		
Offworld	Ended 1985			
Olympia		Shadow Island Games		
Olympia: The Age of Gods		Shadow Island Games		
One-on-One World Conquest		Prime Time Simulations		
One True Faith		Keith Langley		
On-Paper Baseball		On-Paper Baseball		
Operation Barbarossa: The Battle for Russia: 1941-45		War College Simulations PBM, Inc.		
Orc Ba'al	Approximately 1995			
Origins of World War II				
The Orion Nebula		Orpheus Publishing Corporation		
On-Paper Baseball		On-Paper Baseball		
Out Time Days	Ended May 1, 1992	Twin Engine Gaming	Werner and Vicki Freitas (Designer and editor)	
Outer Reaches		Earnshaw Enterprises		
Outpost		Spyder Games		
Overland		Shadow Island Games		
Overlord 5		Jeff Perkins		
Pacific Conflict		Advent Games		
Pandemonium Circus		Distant Vistas		
Pangar Snare	1981	Michael Cranford	Michael Cranford	(Note: Fantasy role-playing game with warriors and "giant mutated jungle cats".)
Parade				
Paths to Glory		Triumph Game Systems		
PBM-Close Action		Command Authority Games		
PBMFL		The Mailbox		
PBMWrestling				
Peacemaker-Peacebreaker		Pierce & Co.		
Pellic Quest		Conflict Interaction Associates		
Penalty!		Dave Carter, Scorpiogames		
Pentagarnia		Steve M. White		
Peril II	1984	K&C Enterprises		
The Perils of Mortimer				
Perseus Arm		Perseus Arm Enterprises		
Phantasy Civil War Alliance		Tri-J Communications		
Phantom Star Raider		Tony Watson		
Phoenix	1989	Gamer's Den		
Phoenix Rising		Phildee Enterprises		
Pieces of Eight!		Undying King Games		
Planetarion				
Planet Master	~1979	Wee Warriors		
Platoon Leader		Triad Simulations		
Play-By-Mail Football League		The Mailbox		
Plexxon		US, UK, CAN		
Polaris		Daredevil		
Pollux		CyberVentures Ent. Group		
Pop Tarts		Received Wisdom		
Port Hazard		Speculation Games		
Portinium	December 1990	Enchanted Horizons		
Power	Ended 1985	ECI		
Power+		ECI		
Powerstar		South Bay Games		
Premier Football		Harlequin Games		
Primer Inter Pares		John Hanson		
Privateers		Tudor Games		
Private Eye		JF&L		
Private Sector		Treesahran Industries		
Privs Inter Pares		Interesting Times		
Proconsul				
Professional Basketball League				
Prokhorovka	Circa 1983	Viking Games		
Psyche		DMC Games	Dave Cooksey	
Pub Quest		Warrior Games		
Quadrant Wars		Quest Game Inc.		
Québec 1759	Active 1973	Gamma Two Games Ltd.		
Quest for Adventure		JF&L		
Quest of Gorr	Only briefly on the market	Game Masters International		
Quest of the Great Jewels	1983	Zorph Enterprises	Mike Shefler (Original developer/moderator)	
Quest: The World of Kharne		Adventures By Mail		
Rainbow Warrior		The Blue Rhino		
Raumkrieg		Flying Buffalo		
Realm		Full Moon Gaming		
Realms of Altair		Full Moon Gaming		
Realms of Fantasy		Graaf Simulations		
Realms of Shaharasai	Early 1994	Darkwood Enchantment		
Realms of Sword and Thunder	1982	Empire Games, Inc.	Glenn Holliday and Chris Peterson (creators)	
Realpolitik		Triad Simulations		
Renaissance		Constantine Xanthos		
Renegade Legion (Centurion)		Fantasy Workship (US), Pagoda Games (UK)		
Return of the Empire		Piranha Games		
Revenge		Devil's Advocate Games		
Riftlords		Flying Buffalo Inc		
Right of Kings		Last World Games		
Rimworlds	1984	Palace Simulations		
Rings of Darkness		Ark Royal Games (Licensed from Roma Games of Australia)		
Roadkill 2115	1990s	Imaginary Enterprises		
The Road to the White House	1998	Tactical Simulation, Inc.		
Robalgon	1984	Robalgon		
Robot Armies		Schubel & Son		
Room 4		Devil's Advocate Games		
Ruler of the Galactic Web	1987	Quail Canyon Systems		
The Runes of Inngoal		Harold Kercher		
S.A.B.R.E.		Pace		
Sail the Solar Wind		Imagination Unlimited		
Samurai Warlords		Bill Paspaliaris		
Saga	Ended 1987	Imagery		
Samurai Starfighter		Simulated Oriental Games		
Samurai Warlord		Bill Paspaliaris		
Sarakond Campaign		Richard Breton		
Satellite Down		GDW		
Saturnalia		Sloth Enterprises		
Scales of Justice		Tudor Games		
Sceptre		Sceptre Roleplaying		
Scoresheet Baseball		Scoresheet Sports		
Scoresheet Football		Scoresheet Sports		
Scramble		Furypost Games		
Sea Kings		Game Systems, Inc.		
Seconds Out		Tactics	Mark Walton	
Secrets of Trime	1985	Frontier Games		(Note: Frontier Games stated in the Jan–Feb 1985 issue of Paper Mayhem magazine that they were a new PBM company and The Secrets of Trime was their first game.)
Sed 9		Jagg Productions		
Seeds of Destruction		Eckert Gaming Group		
Seeking Realm Knights		Zion Games		
Serim Ral		Harlequin Games		
Shadow Lords		Post-it Games		
A Shadow of Earth		Devil's Advocate Games		
Shadow of the Crystals				
Siege America		Schubel & Son, licensed to Red Talon Gaming of Pennsylvania.		
Sirius Command		Inner Dimension Games		
Silverdawn		Entertainment Concepts, Inc (ECI)	Designer: Jim Dutton; Jeff Avery	
Singularity		Shadow Island Games		
Skaal		The Gamesmiths		
Smuggler's Run		Distant Visas		
Sol III		Conflict Productions		
Sovereignty		Silvius and Berchtold		
Space 101		C2 Simulations		
Space Battle	1980	Flying Buffalo		
Space Bounty		Universal Simulations		
Space Combat		Twin Engine Gaming		
Spacefarer		Tansfaal Enterprises		
Space Heroes		Space Heroes		
Space Miner		The Blue Rhino		
Space Quest		Pent Alpha		
Special Agent		TL Designs		
Speculate		Yellowseed Games		
Spiral Arm		Graaf Simulations		
Spiral Arm II		Graaf Simulations		
Smuggler's Run		Adventures By Mail		
Soccer Supremos		GAD Games		
SpyKor		Sudden Asylum		
St. Valentines Day Massacre		Mindgate		
Stand and Deliver (game)	1992	Stand and Deliver	Frank Pompillo	
Starblazer I				
Starcapture		Bill Wood		
Star Cluster		Lief Stensson		
Star Cluster II		C-T Simulations		
Star Cluster Omega		C-T Simulations		
Star Cluster One		The Buchanan Company		
Stardragon	1983	Stardragon	Carl Savage	
Starfleet Academy		JF&L		
Star Fleet Warlords		Agents of Gaming		
Starforce Battles			Charles Mosteller, Scott Estrin, Bob Dickinson, and John Bryne (Design)	
Star Moguls	pre-1993			
Star Quest		Deltax Gaming		
Star Ruler				
Stars of the Dark Well	1984	Mindgate		
Star of Uldor	Circa 1983	Genji Games		
Star Saga		Infinite Odysseys		
Star Sword		Entertainment Plus More, Inc.		
Star Trek: The Correspondence Game		Entertainment Concepts		
Star Venture	1982	Schubel & Son		
Starbase		Quest Games		
StarGate	~1979	ConSim		
StarGlobe	1984 or earlier	DragonByte	Ken Mulholland (of Time Patterns)	
Star King		Software Doctors		
Starfleets & Spacemen	1981	Mike Williams		
Starlord			Mike Singleton	
Starmagic		Cosmos Creation Company		
Starmagic II		Clemens & Associates		
Starmaster		Schubel & Son	Richard Lloyd (designer)	
Starmaster II		Schubel & Son	Debbie Leonard (Development)	
Starquest (different from JF&L's game)		Entertainment Concepts, Inc.		
Starquest (different from Entertainment Concepts, Inc.'s game)		JF&L		
Star Realm		Dynamic Games		
Star-Saga		Infinite Odysseys		
Starship Command		Elite Simulations		
Starway II		Keith Langley		
Starwind		CraftGames		
Stat-Sports Pro Football		Stat-Sports		
State of Decay	1997	Phildee Enterprises		
State of War		Game Systems Inc		
Stat Sports Football		Stat-Sports		
Steel, Fire, and Blood		George Franchi		
Stellar Conquest				
Stellar Crusades		Simulated Genius		
Stellar Dynasty		The Game Company		
Stellar Empire		Rick Barr		
Stellar Knights		Zion Games		
Stellar Marine		Zion Games		
Stellar Realms		HCS Games		
Stellar Syndicate	1987	Quail Canyon Systems		
Stellar Warlords		International Software	Brad Lampl (Creator and Moderator)	
Storm Over Dixie		Armageddon Games		
Strategic Conflict	1983	Schubel & Son		
Strategic Imperial Conquest				
Strategos				
Strike it Rich		HCS Games		
Struggle of Nations		www.webworldinc.com		
Succession		Games Without Frontiers		
Super Filet Wars	Circa 1983	Diadem Enterprises		
SuperNova II		Rolling Thunder Games		
Supremacy		Andon Games		
Swashbuckler		Paspa Games		
Sword of Orian	Ended 1983	North Virginia Games		
Swords of Draknaar		Obsidian Production	Saul Betesh	
Swords of Pelarn	April 1984	Midnight Games	Jim Robinson	
Swords of the Gods		Galactic Simulations		
Sword Lords				
Succession		Games Without Frontiers		
Suergan: The Shattered Isles		Mindshift Design LLC		
Sulfer City		Devil's Advocate Games		
Super Hero Nation		Create A World, Inc.		
SuperNova	1986	Rolling Thunder Games		
Supernova II		Rolling Thunder Games		
Supremacy		Graf Simulations		
Supreme Empires		Create A World, Inc.		
Survival Challenge	~1988	Mindgate		
Survivors		Ultimate Empires, Inc.		
Suzerainty		7th Dimension Gaming		
Swords at Sunset		J&J Combat Simulations		
System III: Star King		Galactic Centurian Systems		
Tactical Assault Group		Quest Games, Inc.		
Tactical Command		Galactic Society Four		
Talwaithe	1981			
Tanx		Fauchard Enterprises		
Task Force		Quest Games		
TATT Postal				
TCW Fantasy Wrestling				
Terra II	1983 or earlier	Clemens & Associates		
Third and Goal		Tactics	Mark Walton	
Third Foundation		Correlated Services	~1983	
Threat	Approximately 1995			
Throne of Rhianon		Vorpal Games		
Third Foundation		Third Foundation		
Thunder at Sea		Coconut Council, Inc.		
Thunder Junction		Leisure Time Unlimited		
Time Chase		Supernova Games		
Time Trap		Flying Buffalo, Inc.		
Timelapse		GAD Games		
The Time Lady				
Time Patrol		KTH		
Toadal Chaos - The Frog Wars		Fractal Dimensions		
To Be King		REGI		
Top Ten Football		Top Twenty Football		
Torpedo Boat Duel		Tudor Games		
Total Conquest				
Total Football Management				
Tracks	1992	Friendly Fire Games		
Trade & Conquest		Frazier Games		
Trajan's Treacherous Trap	1979	Flying Buffalo		
Traveller		Applied Gaming Technologies		
Triad		Karl Zeimetz		
Triax		Galactic Simulations		
The Tribes of Crane	1978	Schubel & Son, Zen Games		
Tribe Vibes		Jeff Perkins		
Trillion Credit Squadron Campaign		Applied Gaming Technologies Inc.		
Tri-Stellar		Battle-Magic Gaming		
Troll Quest		Mercury Games		
Trolls Bottom	1986	Project Basilisk, Dynamic Games	Robert Fortune	
Tunels & Trolls Campaign		Dan Lambert		
Twilight: 2000		GDW		
Twilight's Last Gleaming		George Franchi		
The Ultimate Survival		Steve Sparks		
Ultimate Warrior		Entertainment Plus More, Inc.		
Unexplained		Undying King Games		
United States Championship Wrestling				
Universal Wrestling Association				
Universe II	1979	Clemens and Associates	Jon Clemens	
Universe III	1980	Central Texas Computing	Jon Clemens	
Universe Melting Pot		Shrewd Expanse		
Urban Empire		Leisure Time Unlimited		
Valacia		Psi-Decay Games		
Vampire		Phildee Enterprises		
Veiled Star		Ghetto Games		
Venom		Game Systems Inc		
Vesuvian				
VGA Planets	1992	Gamer's Den		
Vietnam		Schubel & Son		
Virus		R3		
Vorcon Wars				
Super Vorcon Wars		Vorcon Games	John Nicholson	
Waddabeekeo	Ended 1981			
War 1940		Schubel & Son		
Warboid World		Applied Gaming Technologies Inc.		
War Council		Alternative Dimension Enterprises		
Warlands	1987	Furypost Games		
Warlord		Phoenix Publications		
Warlord of Jarnel		JF&L		
Warlord of Thunder Crag		Creative Management Services		
Warlords of the Shattered Land		Zephyr Enterprises, Inc.		
War of 1812		Schubel & Son		
War of the Empires		1960s or 1970s		
War of Wizards		WOW Games		
Warp Force Empires	1987	Emprise Game Systems	Steve Gray (Designer/Gamemaster)	
Warp Force One	1980	Emprise Game Systems		
Warplords		Joseph Teller		
Warriors and Wizards	1992	Rolling Thunder Games, Inc.		
Warriors of the Fractal Domain		Fractal Dimensions		
Wars of the Roses				
The War to End All Wars		Guild of Blades		
Wars of the Dawn World	1981	Bud Link		
War of the Emma Nations	1981	Tom Webster		
War of the Wizards	1981	Jabberwock Enterprises		
Warworld	1985. Ended 1987	Furypost Games		
Wastelands		Baron's Regime		
Wasteland Warriors		War Without Tears		
WATEN (formerly GWITEN)	1983	Tom Webster		
Way of the Warrior	1985. Ended 1987	Genji Games		
WdG Mithra		ChoZen FroZen Games		
The Weapon	1984	Fantastic Simulations, 4 Sight, Verein der Feunde, Harrow Postal Games (UK)	Danield B. Ealey (Designer)	
Westworld	1993	NLT Enterprises		
White Gold	1985	Ben Parkinson		
Whodunit		Devil's Advocate Games		
Wild Frontiers		Red Talon Gaming		
The Wing				
Winterworld		D. Shulkind		
Witch Doctor		Argonaut Publishing		
Wizards & Warriors		Eclipse Consulting, Inc.		
Wofan	1980	The Gamemaster	Larry G. Hall	
Wolfpack		JF&L		
Worldbuilders	1984	Worldbuilders	Marty Kloeden	
World at War		E-Mail Games		
World Campaigns		World Campaigns		
World Electronic Football League		Alpha Simulations		
World Electronic Hockey League		Alpha Simulations		
World Emperors II		Deltax Gaming		
World of Arden		Arden Entertainment		
World of Angremar	1984 or earlier	The Round Table		
World of Chaos		GAD Games		
World of Velgor	To 1985 (then became The Melding)	Comstar Enterprises		
World of Wildon		Randy Gillette		
World Conquest		Prime Time Simulations		
World War		The Mailbox		
World War 2		Miller Systems		
World War II: A Second World War Simulation		War College Simulations PBM, Inc.		
World War IV		High Point Games, Pagoda Games (UK), JFH Games, Flying Buffalo Inc.		
Wyrdworld				
WWII: Open Warfare				
Xenophobe		Emprise Game Systems		
Xyhora				
You Rule!	1989	Lucky Llama Games		
You're an Amoeba, GO!		Monastic Software		
Zardar				
Zorphwar	Ended 1986	Zorph Enterprises		
Zombie Zone USA		Fax Attack		
Zot Madness		Games Without Frontiers		

== Inactive international play-by-mail games ==
List
Game (Note: Games include those that moved past playtesting and were introduced to the market as paid games with players)	Released	Publisher (Note: Publishers occasionally changed for play-by-mail games when companies bought the rights to games or licensed games from the original publishers. Publishers noted in this list are as of the date of the reference cited.)	Country	Notes
1066		Games Without Frontiers	UK	
1500 Gold				
523 Sweet FA		Camelot Games	UK	
Active Fighting Club			France	
A Day at the Races		Dracs Games	UK	
Absolon Empire		Steve Barker	Denmark	
Absolute Power		Jade Enterprises	UK	
Advance Australia Fair			AUS	
After Ragnarok		AR	1987	
Agamemmnon II		Kelem Games	UK	
Age of Discovery			Canada	
Albion		Pete Thornhill	UK	
Alchemist		Seventh Heaven	UK	
Alkimora				
Ameat				
Ancient Empires II		Jason Oates	UK	
Ancient Empires II		Jason Oates	UK	
Android Arena	Circa 1989	Tertium Games	UK	
Andromeda Connection			UK	
Anubis Scripts			France	
Aqua-ball		Jasper Games	UK	
Aqua Eternam	1997	Nick Haynes	UK	
Ars Regendi			German and English	
Apex PBM Soccer		Apex Games	UK	
Aquila		Kevin Johns	UK	
Arcadia	Ended 1987	Jade Games	UK	
Archipel			France	
Arya 1325 Campaign		Andrew Walfork	UK	
Ashes of Empire		CSPP	Germany	
Assyria's End		Agema Publications	UK	
Asteroid Wars		Jason Oates	UK	
Astrowars		Astraa	UK	
Austerlitz - Der Aufstieg des Adlers			German	
Avalon	1989		UK	
Away the Lads		Dracs Games	UK	
Aztecs		Phildee	UK	
Babylon 5 - Le jeu par email			France	
Bacteria		Dynamic Games	Australasia	
Balance of Power		Yellowseed Games of Canada	Canada	
Bakschisch				
Bakufu		Dark Wolf Games	Ireland, UK	
Balkania	1992	The Australian Wizard	Australia	(Note: A version of El Mythico set in Yugoslavia.)
Bananenflanke: Der Fussballmanager			German-only	
Barbarians at the Gate		Software Simulations	UK	
Basketball		Camelot Games	UK	
Battlecrabs		Dag Webber, Project Basilisk (UK)	Germany, UK	
Battle Dirge		Lombot Publishing	UK	
Battle Master	Peter Read	Dynamic Games	1988	
Battle for Starbase Zenith		Miller Systems		
Battleground		Jammco	UK	
Battlequest		Omnipotent Eye	UK	
The Betting Game	1989	Temple Games	UK	
Beyond		Crasiworld	UK	
Beyond the Green Sun		Sevenstar Games	UK	
Beyond the Pale		A. L. Butters	UK	
Beyond the Waves				
Bifrost				
The Biz	1989	Andrew South	UK	
Bloodgrace		Odd Child Games, New Hope Games		
Boracay Philippines		Roy C. Rae	Peter Hudson (Designer)	
The Boss		Daniel Wood	UK	
Calvana	Circa 1989	Tertium Games	UK	
Castle Assault		Chepro Ltd		
Centaurea	1989	Future Games	UK	
The Champions League		Destiny Games		
Chaos Tech	1996	Dream Shadows	UK	
Chrestonim			German-only	
Chronicle			UK	
The Chronicles of Tangle Wood	1989	Silverroot Enterprises	UK	
The Chronicles Of The Knights Of Avalon		Jade Games	UK	
Cities of the Dark Elves		Worlds Apart	UK	
Civilisation		PH Games		
Clans		Warnor Games	UK	
Close Action PBM		Command Authority Games	UK	
The Cluster Rebellion	1984	PBM Magazine	UK	
Coeshaw Postal Football League		Mark Coeshaw	UK	
Come on You Reds		Camelot Games	UK	
Commander – Europe at War			France	
Conquests		Daniel Wood	UK	
The Contest		White Knight Games	UK	
Copa Mundial			German-only	
Corporate War		State of Mind	UK	
Cosmos		Post-it Games		
Crack of Doom II		Harlequin Games	UK	
Crasimoff's Quest World (Crasi-World)		Crasiworld		
Crasimoff's World		Adventures by Mail	UK	
Creephouse		Project Basilisk	UK	
Crystal Quest		HPS Promotions	UK	
Cyber League		Finoldin Games (French Company)	UK	
Cybernation	1990	Ben Warrington, DNA Games	UK	(Note: Hand-moderated cyberpunk role-playing game. GM magazine praised the rulebook's presentation and the atmospheric narration of each turn.)
Cybertycoon		CME Technologies	AUS	
Cyborn			France	
Dark Age		Software Simulations	UK	
Dark Age II		Software Simulations	UK	
Darkfire		Nick Stone	UK	
Dark Pentacle	1990	Spleenmangler Games	UK	(Note: Fantasy role-playing game. GM magazine noted the game system similarities with Saturnalia, but praised the additional armour and inventory mechanics. The "turbo-post" option – which provided an immediate turnaround for an extra fee – was criticised as being unfair.)
DBU - Die Bundesliga			German	
Deadzone		Jonathan Bell	UK	
Deathblade				
Decision in the East		D. Roberts	UK	
Delenda Est Carthago	Judith Proctor	Waveney Games	UK	
Démange – Le Jeu			France	
Demon		Shardar Games	UK	
The Derby	Circa 1989	Camelot Games	UK	
Der Supermanager			German	
Diadochi		Cyclops PBM	UK	
Directive 32		Richard Cozens	UK	
Dogfight	Circa 1989	Dark Mask Games	UK	
Dogfight! Battle for the Skies!		Rampage Games PBM	UK	
The Dominant Power		Creative Gaming		
Doomsphere		Games Unlimited	UK	
Downfall (Diplomacy Variant)		Games Without Frontiers	UK	
Diplomacy Ludomaniac			Germany	
Dragonhelm		Ulaidh Games	UK	
Dreamscape		Robin Seamer	UK	
DW RPG		Daniel Wood	UK	
Dwarf Falls			Canada	
Eagle		Sabre Games	UK	
Eagle, Falcon, Gryphon and Mundis		Games Design Corporation	UK	
Eastern Temples		Finoldin Games (French Company)	UK	
Einstein's Lot		Ulaidh Games	Ireland, UK	
Emperor		East Empire Games	UK	
Empires of Corinium			UK	
En Garde! Banana (PBEM)			UK	
En Garde!: Briny		Briny En Garde! (Terry Cooke)	UK	
En Garde! Dieu et Mon Droi		Timewyrm	UK	
En Garde!: King & Cardinal		Ian Coleman	UK	
En Garde!: LPBS		Paul Evans	UK	
En Garde!: Sage En Garde!		Sage En Garde	UK	
En Garde! Small Furry Undergrads (SFUG)		Small Furry Creatures Press	UK	
En Garde! The Sun King		Nigel Mission	UK	
Empires		Software Simulations	UK	
Endgame		Harlequin	UK	
Endless Time and Space		Sabre Games	UK	
Epic	1989	KJC Games	UK	
Epoch of Might		Dark Wolf Games	Ireland, UK	
Espionage		Sage Systems		
Ether		Tingols Games	UK	
Europa		Timewyrm	UK	
Euro Soccer Boss		Derek Doran	UK	
Evolution of the Stars		Verein der Feunde	Germany	
Explorers of Orion				
Extra Time-Chairman		KJC Games	UK	
Extra Time-original		KJC Games/Crasiworld	UK	
Faceplant	Circa 1989	Endeavour Fantasy Games	UK	Skating game.
Falcon		Sabre Games	UK	
F.A.M.E. (Force and Magic Entwined)		T.J. Drew	UK	
Fantasy Soccer		KJC Games	UK	
Fantasya - Welt des Traumes			German	
Felony	1989	S. Bennet	UK	
Fibonacci				
First Crusade		Kelem Games	UK	
Food Chain		Phildee Enterprises	UK	
Football Predictions		Dracs Games	UK	
Footballisto			France	
For God, King & Country		Agema Publications	UK	
Formula One Champion		Steve Evans	UK	
Fortunes of War		Webwars Continuum	Canada	
Freedom PBM Soccer		Freedom PBM Soccer	UK	
From out of Aeons Gone		Silver Dreamer	UK	
From the Mouth of Hell				
Further Into Fantasy		The Games Laboratory	UK	
Fussball-Liga			Germany	
Gameplan		Software Simulations/Danny McConnell, Ab Initio Games	UK	
Gameplan Baseball		Danny McConnell, Ab Initio Games	UK	
Gameplan Boxing		Danny McConnell, Ab Initio Games	UK	
Gameplan: Advanced		Software Simulations/Danny McConnell, Ab Initio Games	UK	
Games Guru		Guru Games (Matthew Skidmore)	UK	(Note: Players run a computer games firm.)
Gang City		Athena's Avatar (AUS licensee)	Canada, Australia	
Ghostbusters		Temple Games		
Gladiatoria			France	
Gladiator School	Circa 1989	Camelot Games	UK	
Global Diplomacy	Circa 1995	E-Mail Games	Canada	
Globemaster	Circa 1989	Time Patterns	UK	
Gloire et Pouvoir			France	
The Glory of Kings		Agema Publications	UK	
Glory Seekers		Parlos Games	UK	
Gormants			New Zealand	
Grand National		Camelot Games	UK	
The Great Detective		Creative Encounters		
Green Sun		Seven Star Games	UK	
Grid Bowl				
Gridstats			UK	
Grid Wars		Games Design Corporation	UK	
Gryphon		Sabre Games	UK	
Gladivs et Pilvm		The PBM Express	UK	
Gothick	1989	Temple Games	UK	
Gunboat Diplomacy		Agema Publications	UK	
Hattrick			France	
Haunted Manor		Madhouse	UK	
Heavens Above		Fuel PBM	UK	
Heldenwelt (Heroes world)		SSV Klapf-Bachler OEG	Austria	
Heroes of Olynthus		Timewyrm	UK	
Heroville			France	
High Kings of Dolchus			UK	
Hitmakers	1989		UK	
Homebase Alpha		The Games Laboratory with WOZ Games	UK	
Homeworld			New Zealand	
Horgoroth: Gateway to Undagala		Quillian Enterprises		
Horizons End		Schubel & Son		
Horses For Courses		Spellbinder Games	UK	
Houseworld II			New Zealand	
The Hunting		D.M.C. Games		
Imperial Honorarium		Ragtime Leisure	UK	
Infinite Adventure	1989		UK	
Influences			France	
In Off the Post		In Off the Post	UK	
In the House Today		Sabre Games	UK	
International Challenge	1989	Coe Games	UK	
Intergalactic Computerized Wrestling Federation		Johnny Vendetta	UK	
Invasion	Circa 1989	GAD Games	UK	
Island of the Gobin King		Goblin Games	UK	
It's a Funny Old Game	1989	Richard Stretton	UK	
It's in the Net		Chris Wright	UK	
Jack Duckworth's Alternate Universe		Simon Ives	UK	
Jetball		Alchemist's Guild	UK	
Jumbo Crisis	Circa 1989	MAG	UK	
JWA Wrestling		Richard Fryer	UK	
Kalevala			German	
Kapow!		Vengeance Games		
The Keys of Bled		Spellbinder Games	UK	
Keys of Medohk		Infinite Game Design Studio, licensed to Phildee Enterprises (UK), and Dynamic Games (US)	Australasia only in 1996, also UK, US	
Kingdoms of Vengeance			UK	
Kingdoms of Vengeance III		Vengeance Games		
Kings of Steel		Stephen R. White	UK	
Klall-Karvv: Prison of the Elementals		Seventh Heaven	UK	
Knights of Christendom		Sabre Games	UK	
Kontos		Battle Cry Play-by-Mail	UK	
Kosmor – Forces of the Galaxies			German	
Ksar Exo		Terre de Jeux	France	
La Glorie du Roi		Agema Publications	UK	
The Lands of Ghamaxtri		WHC		
La Ultima Cruzada		Sabre Games	UK	
Land of Legend		Echelon 1	UK	
The Land of the Basilisk	Robert Fortune (designer)	Project Basilisk	UK	
Lands of Elvaria	1989	Mark Pinder	UK	(Note: Hand-moderated fantasy game in which players controlled five characters; 5 to 10 day turnaround.)
Lands of the Crimson Sun		AR	1987	
Lanista			UK	
League Soccer	1986	Necrom Games	UK	(Note: Football management game described by GM magazine as "run-of-the-mill" with a "tatty" rulebook.)
Legacy of the Panther		West Penne Games	UK	
Legacy of Val-Hadahd			UK	
Legend of the Stars		Adrian Bagley		
Legends of Israa		Viking Games	UK	
Le Nécromant			France	
Les Petites Betes Soyeuses	1986	The Ninth Legion	UK	
Lizards		The Ninth Legion	UK	
Logan's Run		Sage Systems		
Lords of Morkar		Spellbinder Games		
Lore Lords of Britain		Lore Games Limited		
Loremasters of Corlean	Circa 1989	Reality Shift Games	UK	
LTWars		Spellbinder Games		
Lurkans & Durkans		Island Light & Magick		
L'univers du Flow			France	
Matrix Hockey			France	
Machiavellian		Seventh Heaven	UK	
Macedon		Alchemist's Guild	UK	
Mageborn		DFS Productions		
Magelords Of Dorm		Project Basilisk	UK	
Magic Cards		Madhouse	UK	
Maim, Mutilate & Murder		Island Light & Magick		
Man-to-man		Vengeance Games		
MCMII			UK	
Megalomania		M.A.G., Odde Fellows and Co. (licensed to GAD Games)	UK	
Men in Black			UK	
Middle-Earth PBM Third Age		Strategic Fantasy Games of Australia		
Midhir		Timewyrm	UK	
Midhir: Cities of Olynthus		Timewyrm	UK	
Midhir: Realms of Israa		Timewyrm (Andrew Fulara)	UK	
Mighty Heroes		Received Wisdom	UK	
Millenium			Spain	
The Millennium Effect	1997	Steve Barker	UK	
Mithra		Wolfgang Roefke	Germany	
Mobster	1989	On the Brink	UK	
Morchael		Daniel Wright	UK	
Morne Plane			France	
Mortal Fighters		Allsorts	UK	
Mortis Maximus		Madhouse 6	UK	
Movie Mogul		Movie Mogul	UK	
Multiplex		ESC	UK	
Mundis		Sabre Games	UK	
Napoleonic Battles		Agema Publications	UK	
NBL Aussie Basketball		Norman	AUS	
Neanderthal Days		Griffin Games	UK	
Necromancer		Madhouse 6	UK	
Nemak 2			France	
Neutral Zone		Neutral Zone	UK	
New Earth			UK	
Night of the Things		Madhouse	UK	
The Nithingwood (Note: Single-character, hand-moderated fantasy RPG)	1991	Rob Lane	UK	
No Holds Barred		Laughing Dog	UK	
Nomads of Urth			UK	
Nuclear Domination				
Nutgrabbers		Comatose Games		(Note: Players roleplay squirrels collecting nuts.)
Nuke!			New Zealand	
Of Steam and Ether		GRLA Reaper Design	UK	
Omega Squad			UK	
The Omega Victor	1988	Harrow Postal Games	UK	
Orion's Finger				
Orks			Sweden	
Outbound			UK	
Outlaw	Ended 1989	Warren Saul	UK	
Ovalie			France	
Overlord		State of Mind Games	UK	
PAFL			UK	
Paloma Football Management		Simon Courcha	UK	
The Paloma League		Justin Shore	UK	
Panzer-East		Agema Publications	UK	
Panzergruppe II		Agema Publications	UK	
Parade		Nick Stone	UK	
Paraglyphics - The Challenge of the Magus		Chepro Ltd		
Pathocrom		Innovative Games		
Peril II		K + C Enterprises		
Phantasmech		Crasiworld	UK	
Phantasy Politician Alliance			UK	
Phoenix Rising		Phildee Enterprises	UK	
Pioneer	1989	Rob Winrow	UK	
Planet Soccer		David Scriven	UK	
Planetary Wrestling Syndicate		Thomas Lancaster	UK	
Play On		Danny McConnel, Ab Initio Games	UK	
Plexxon 0			Canada	
Pop Star	1989	Dan McCrossan, Ideal Games	UK	(Note: Players tried to become a successful pop star. Computer moderated, 14-day turnaround.)
Portals and Palaces		Adam Hollindale	UK	
The Power of Money		Daydream	Germany	
Premier League			UK	
Premier Management Football		Premier Management	UK	
Premier Master Soccer		Paul King	UK	
Primvs Inter Pares		Interesting Times	UK	
Pro-Golf	1989	R.C. Pugsley	UK	
Pro Soccer		Olympia Games	UK	
Prometheus		Hunky Monkey Games	UK	
Pub Kickin'		Camelot Games	UK	
Pure Fantasy Ftbll		Pure Fantasy Games	UK	
Pyraglyphics	1989	Chepro	UK	
Quest		Adventures By Mail, KJC Games	UK	
Quixo				
Raceplan Grand Prix		Danny McConnell, Ab Initio Games	UK	
The Race	1989	Kremmoid Games	UK	
Racinis				
Raiders Of Gwaras	Prior to 1989	MJR Games	UK	(Note: Medieval fantasy game adapted from a Dungeons & Dragons campaign. GM magazine stated that Raiders of Gwaras had "received wide critical acclaim from many players".)
Railway Rivals				
Ranch Wars	1989	Micro-Genesis	UK	
Rangers and Rovers		Roy Taylor	UK	
Rat Racing	Circa 1989	Darren Cook, GAD Games	UK	
Reality Racing		Camelot Games	UK	
Realm of Darkness	1987	Pegasus Games		
The Realm of Elysia		The Realm of Elysia	1987	
Realms of Israa		Viking Games	UK	
Realms of Lothmil		Timewyrm	UK	
Realm of The Priest		C.M.A.D.	UK	
Reorx	1989	Earlsdene Enterprises	UK	(Note: Sword and sorcery game similar to Saturnalia, no fixed turnaround.")
Revenge Of The Many Legged Man Eating Mutant Tiger Hounds From Outer Space		Alchemist's Guild	UK	
Reversi V3.4			France	
Riddle of the Sands		Silver Dreamer	UK	
Royal Alliances		Finoldin Games (French Company)	UK	
Rugby League Breakout		Danny McConnell, Ab Initio Games	UK	
Rugby League Challenge		Camelot Games	UK	
Rugby League Stats		Danny McConnell, Ab Initio Games	UK	
Rugby Union Stats		Danny McConnell, Ab Initio Games	UK	
Ruler of the Galactic Web: Dragonspire		Software Simulations	AUS	
Run Chase		Software Simulations	UK	
Ryn				
S/F		Received Wisdom	UK	
Saturnalia: Exile		Harlequin Games	UK	
Saturnalia: NE		Dark Wolf Games	Northern Ireland, UK	
Saturnalia: NW		Mark Williams	UK	
Saturnalia: S		Mike Absolom	UK	
Saturnalia: Serpent Isles		Ashley Casey	UK	
Saturnalia: Veridian Isles		Dark Wolf Games	Northern Ireland, UK	
Save Our Souls		Dave Hughes	UK	
Schwertreiter			German-only	
Scottish Email Soccer League		SESL, Mark Creasy	UK	
Seadogs and Darlings		Seadogs and Darlings	UK	
Sea Kings	1989		UK	
Sector Five		Pterra Games	UK	
Seige		Vorcon Wars	UK	
Serim Ral		Thomas Harlan	UK	
Serim Ral		Incubus Designs	UK	
Shadowlords II		Post-It Games	Australasia	
Shambhala		Wayne (Shambhala)	UK	
Shattered World		Jade Games		
Siege	Circa 1989	Vorcon Games	UK	
Skullball		On the Brink	UK	
Slamdunk		Danny McConnell, Ab Initio Games	UK	
Slapshot		Danny McConnell, Ab Initio Games	UK	
Slapshot	1989	Mark Walton, Tactics	UK	Ice hockey simulation.
Slaves and Slavers	1989	Harry's Games	UK	
The S-League		Sporting Dreams	UK	
Soccer Boss	1989	Dan McCrossan, Ideal Games	UK	Simple football management
Soccer Challenge		Mark Palin	UK	
Soccer Manager		Chris Robey	UK	
Soccer Sevens		Robin Seamer	UK	
Soccer Six	Circa 1989	Camelot Games	UK	
Soccer Star		Trident Games	UK	
Soccer Stats		Jason Oates	UK	
Soccer Strategy		Software Simulations	UK	
Soccer Supremos	1989		UK	
Soccergame.de - Fussball Pbem			German	
Sopwith		Richard Morris	UK	
Space Troopers		KJC Games	UK	
Space Plan		Software Simulations	UK	
Speculate		Software Simulations	UK	
Splat the Galaxy			UK	
Sport of Kings				
Squad Leader		Richard Miles	UK	
SSFA		Chris Baylis	UK	
Star Empires (Star Empires II, III, IV)	1984	Geoff Squibb, Spellbinder Games	UK	
Starfall		Alan J Mathews		
Star Flaws		Island Light & Magick		
Starfleet Warlord		Pagoda Games	UK	
Starglobe	Circa 1984	Time Patterns	UK	
Starglobe+		Timepatterns PBM Games	UK	
Starglobe 3				
Starhawk		Sage Systems		
Starmagic III	1989	Whitegold Games	UK	
StarQuest		Harlequin Games	UK	
Star Riders	Hans Guevin	Ianus Publications Inc.	Canada	
Stars!		Empire	UK	
Star Tactics – La Saga des Etoile			France	
Star Wars Empire - Officiers de l'Empire			France	
Sternenhimmel				
Sticks & Stones		Saul D. Betesh Co.	Canada	
Stockbroker		Games Without Frontiers	UK	
Streets of Blood		Raider Leisure	UK	
Streetwise		The Games Laboratory with WOZ Games	UK	
St. Vals II		Rampage Games		
Subterrania	1990	UK	Timepattern Games	(Note: Licensed from designer Tim Lomas. Computer moderated, two week turnaround. 25-move game in which colonies of ants compete in a 10×10×3 maze.)
Summit Soccer League		Summit Soccer League	UK	
Super Vorcon Wars	Circa 1989	Vorcon Games	UK	
St. Valentine's Day Massacre	Circa 1989	Rampage Games	UK	
St. Valentine's II	Circa 1989	Rampage Games	UK	
Symmachia			France	
Szenario			UK	
Tartarus		Faraway Games	UK	
Tatanka		Terre de Jeux	France	
Team Balance		Martin Burrows	UK	
Ten to Three		J. Foster, Ten to Three	UK	
Tennis JPEM			France	
Terran III	1983	Games Without Frontiers	UK	
Tharnak			German	
Thaura			Canada	
Throne of Cofain		Morton Larsen	UK	
Timelapse			UK	
Timepilot		Galactic Society Four		
The Time Sentinel		Vorcon Games	UK	
Top of the League	1989	Tony Dudley	UK	
Torrausch			German-only	
Total Conquest			Europe	
Tough at the Top		Games By Mail	UK	
TourmanageR - DAS Radsport-Pbem			German	
Trangrad		STS Games	Germany	
Trolls Bottom	1989	KJC Games (UK)	Sweden, UK	
Túlélõk Földje	1992	Beholder Kft.	Hungary	
Tyvanah				
Ultimate Rugby		Ultra Sports	UK	
Ultimate Test		Simon Williams	UK	
Ultraball 2100			France	
Ultra Cricket		Ultra Sports	UK	
Ultra Tennis		Ultra Sports	UK	
Under Different Suns			UK	
Untamed Land	1989		UK	
Unquiet Slumbers			UK	
Valhalla		Mandrake PBM	UK	
Vecta		Mark Wightman		
Vendetta		Agema Publications	UK	
Viking Saga		Viking Saga	UK	
Vitriol		Received Wisdom	UK	
The Wall Game		Nick Stone	UK	
War of the Dark God		Morton Larsen	UK	
Warlord		KJC Games	UK	
Warm Up		Finoldin Games (French Company)	UK	
Warst★r (Warstar)		Interesting Times	UK	
Welt der Goetter	1978	Dragonquest	Germany	
Where Lies the Power				
Where Lies the Power II		Vengeance Games		
Wild World Web		Received Wisdom	UK	
Winning Post		Adrian Glover	UK	
Whitegold		Frontline Games	UK	
World Conquest	1988	Prime Time Simulations, SSV Klapf-Bachler OEG	Germany	
World Fictional Wrestling		Chris Bury, World Fictional Wrestling	UK	
World of Chaos	Mid-1980s	GAD Games	UK	
World of Denagda	Circa 1996	Black Pyramid Games	UK	
World of Vengeance				
World War I Battles		Agema Publications	UK	
Worlds Apart		Colin Andrews	UK	
World Domination (Diplomacy Variant)		Games Without Frontiers	UK	
Wottascore		Camelot Games	UK	
WOW		Russell Smith	UK	
WW IV Blitz		Pagoda Games	UK	
WW IV H2H		Pagoda Games	UK	
Xanoth	Circa 1989	Manifestation Games	UK	
Xarian Adventures		True North Gaming	Canada	
Xott		Antony Dunks	UK	
Xott Solo		Antony Dunks	UK	
Zardar	1989	Simon Moore (GM)	UK	
Zylok Wars		Destiny Games		

== Selected sources ==
- 1st Class: The Play By Mail Games Magazine
- Adventurer magazine.
- American Gamer magazine (July–August 1990).
- Appelcline, Shannon (2011). Designers & Dragons. Mongoose Publishing. ISBN 978-1-907702-58-7.
- Challenge magazine.
- Computer Gamer magazine.
- Computer Games International
- Crash magazine.
- D2 Report magazine.
- Different Worlds magazine
- Dragon magazine.
- Flagship magazine.
- Flying Buffalo Quarterly (previously The Flying Buffalo's Favorite Magazine)
- Games Games Games magazine.
- Games International magazine.
- Games Without Frontiers magazine.
- Gaming Universal magazine.
- GM Magazine.
- Journal of the PBM Gamer.
- The Nuts & Bolts of PBM.
- Paper Mayhem magazine.
- PBMZine magazine.
- Shadis magazine.
- Space Gamer/Fantasy Gamer magazine.
- Suspense & Decision magazine.
- The Games Machine magazine.
- The Play-By-Mail Report magazine.
- The Postal Warrior magazine.
- White Wolf magazine.
