= Death & Sorrow =

Medieval play-by-mail wargame

- Publishers: Eckert Gaming Group
- Years active: 1989 to unknown
- Genres: Role-playing, medieval fantasy
- Languages: English
- Players: 15
- Playing time: Fixed
- Materials required: Instructions, order sheets, turn results, paper, pencil
- Media type: Play-by-mail or email

Death & Sorrow is a play-by-mail game published by Eckert Gaming Group.

== Publication history ==
The game was published by Eckert Gaming Group of Rochester, NY.

== Gameplay ==
Death & Sorrow is a play-by-mail set in medieval times. Its map comprises 119 provinces, four of which were mountainous. The game's purpose was to conquer 50% of the 115 provinces. An alternate path to victory was for two players to control 2/3 or three players to control 90% of the land. There were 15 players per game, each starting with 100 infantry and 50 cavalry troops for expansion by conquest. Diplomacy was a key element of gameplay. Game turns covered three months of time, requiring up front planning for the turn duration.

== Reception ==
Dale Cook reviewed Death & Sorrow in White Wolf No. 23 (Oct./Nov. 1990), rating it a 4 out of 5 and stated that "All in all, this game is a blast, but I will caution you: Death & Sorrow is not for the dull-of-thought. The game dynamics are complex and flexible enough that I feel I can safely say that the strategy you develop is primarily limited by your imagination, not by the rules. I realize that's saying a lot, but it's true."

== See also ==
- List of play-by-mail games

== Bibliography ==
- Bost, Robert (July–August 1990). "Death & Sorrow". Paper Mayhem. No. 43. pp. 25–26.
- Chenevert, Phil (July–August 1990). "Death & Sorrow: A Review". Paper Mayhem. No. 43. pp. 22–24.
- Cook, Dale (October–November 1990). "Play by Mail Game Review: Death & Sorrow". White Wolf Magazine. No. 23. pp. 41–42.
- Editors (January–February 1995). "PBM Game Ratings: As of 11/18/94". Paper Mayhem. No. 70. pp. 44–45.
- Mitchell, Kieron, ed. (1990). "The 1990–1991 Who's Who Among Play-By-Mail-Gamers". Who's Who Among Play-by-Mail Gamers. K&C Enterprises. pp. 115–155.
