= Strategic Imperial Conquest =

Fantasy role-playing game

Strategic Imperial Conquest is a fantasy, play-by-mail (PBM) wargame created by John Lagos. The game's goal was to build the largest kingdom in a medieval setting. Players made decisions on economics (taxing cities), diplomacy, and making war with the goal of the game to reach 5,000 victory points.

== Development ==
The game was playtested in 1992 with initial commercial availability scheduled for January 1993 with rulebooks costing $5, turns 1–5 at $2 each, and subsequent turns $4 each. Reviewers Debra and Edward Leon Guerrero stated in the playtesting period that the game was "definitely worth the money".

== Gameplay ==
Strategic Imperial Conquest was a computer-moderated PBM wargame set in ancient times. The goal was to build the largest kingdom in a medieval setting. 40 to 70 players operated on a 100 × 100 hex map with land and water areas containing various features. Players made decisions on economics (taxing cities), diplomacy, and making war with the goal of the game to reach 5,000 victory points.

== Reception ==
George Cameron reviewed the game in the January 1992 issue of Flagship. He rated the game at 5 stars, stating that it would appeal to both beginners and advanced players. He gave the game positive marks for gamemaster interaction, turnaround time, and game interest.

== See also ==
- List of play-by-mail games

== Bibliography ==
- Cameron, George (January 1992). "Strategic Imperial Conflict: Abstract but Fast". Flagship. No. 35. p. 43.
- Editors (June 1991). "The Spokesmen Speak: Strategic Imperial Conflict". Flagship. No. 32. pp. 48–49.
- Guerrero, Debra and Edward Leon (May–June 1992). "Be King of Your Castle in Strategic Imperial Conquest". Paper Mayhem. No. 54. pp. 32–33.
