= Sirius Command =

Play-by-mail wargame

- Game title
- Publishers: Inner Dimension Games
- Years active: Early 1990s
- Genres: play-by-mail
- Languages: English
- Playing time: Months
- Materials required: Instructions, order sheets, turn results, paper, pencil
- Media type: Play-by-mail or email

Sirius Command is a play-by-mail (PBM) game published by Inner Dimension Games.

== History and development ==
Sirius Command was a roleplaying, play-by-mail game. It was published by Inner Dimension Games of New Paltz, NY.

== Gameplay ==
Set in 2084, the game's purpose is to be the first three players to score 15,000 victory points, achieved by economic, political, and military advancements. Players led one of twenty nations, with an additional 100 non-player nations in each game. Country variables included: "Aggression, Climate, Economy, Information, Morale, Nationalism, and Piety".

There were no maps required, as movement was simple. Combat was a game element, with military factors comprising ballistic missiles, missile defenses, and military forces. Intrigue could also play a significant part in the game. Game duration was 15–20 turns.

== Reception ==
The editor of the U.S. edition of Flagship reviewed the game. He thought the lack of a map was a drawback, but said, "I'd give it 8 out of 10 for providing varied pleasures and challenges at a reasonable ... price". Gerri Macagnone reviewed the game in a 1992 issue of Paper Mayhem, stating that "the game is great". Reviewer Vickie Lloyd commented in 1992 that "This is without a doubt, one of the best PBM games I've ever played ... [it] has everything you're looking for in a close-ended PBM; politics, strategy, diplomacy, economics, military force, and espionage all balled up in one game that goes fast and has you hanging around the mailbox waiting for turns".

== See also ==
- List of play-by-mail games

== Bibliography ==
- Bost, Bob (September 1991). "Sirius Command: Challenge Without Overload". Flagship. No. 33 (U.S. ed.). pp. 45–46.
- Macagnone, Gerri (January–February 1992). "Sirius Command: A Review". Paper Mayhem. No. 52. pp. 8–10.
- Lloyd, Vicki (January–February 1992). "Sirius Command: A Review". Paper Mayhem. No. 52. pp. 12–13.
