= Thunder at Sea =

Play-by-mail naval wargame

- Publishers: Command Authority Games (US), Coconut Council (US), Paul Webber (UK)
- Years active: 1993 to unknown
- Genres: naval wargame
- Languages: English
- Players: varies
- Playing time: Fixed
- Materials required: Instructions, order sheets, turn results, paper, pencil
- Media type: Play-by-mail

Thunder at Sea is a closed-ended, computer moderated, play-by-mail (PBM) naval wargame. It was published by Command Authority Games and Coconut Council in the United States and Paul Webber in the UK. The game was set in the period 1906 to 1945, using various historical scenarios.

== History and development ==
Thunder at Sea was a naval wargame published by Command Authority Games of Iowa City, Iowa. In January 1995 Don Ayers of Command Authority Games transferred games underway to the PBM company Coconut Council for a planned year hiatus. In 1995, Paul Webber began running the game in the UK A game in 1996 using the Battle of Jutland scenario, had 45 players.

== Gameplay ==
The game's timeframe was 1906 to 1945. Combat elements included surface naval vessels only. The publisher offered various scenarios, including the Battle of the Platte and Battle of Jutland. Reviewer Patrick M. Rodgers stated that the game had "a definite focus on historical accuracy and realism. Diplomacy occurred in-game.

== Reception ==
B.E. Wright reviewed the game in a 1996 issue of Paper Mayhem. He stated, "I've played in a lot of tactical naval games but this game has the most realistic feel of them all, and I wholeheartedly recommend Thunder at Sea to any and all."

== See also ==
- List of play-by-mail games

== Bibliography ==
- Palmer, Mike (September–October 1994). "Thunder at Sea: When Legends Meet". Flagship. No. 51 (US ed.). pp. 14, 16.
- Palmer, Mike (January–February 1995). "When Legends Meet (part 3): Close Quarters". Flagship. No. 53 (US ed.). pp. 33–35.
- Rodgers, Patrick M. (January–February 1995). "Post Marque: Ship Ahoy! New Games on the Horizon [Thunder at Sea]". Shadis. No. 17. p. 93.
- Wright, B.E.; Stone, Trey (May–June 1995). "Thunder At Sea Demo – Raiders!". Paper Mayhem. No. 72. pp. 8–13.
- Wright, B.E. (May–June 1996). "The Fifth Battle Squadron: A Jutland Perspective". Paper Mayhem. No. 78. pp. 19–20.
