= Kings of Karadon =

Play-by-mail role-playing game

- Publishers: Hunky Monkey Games
- Years active: 1992 to unknown
- Genres: Role-playing, fantasy wargame
- Languages: English
- Playing time: Fixed
- Materials required: Instructions, order sheets, turn results, paper, pencil
- Media type: Play-by-mail or email

Kings of Karadon is a closed-end, mixed-moderated, play-by-mail fantasy wargame. It was originally published by Hunky Monkey Games.

== History and development ==
Kings of Karadon was published by Hunky Monkey Games. It began running as early as 1992. The game was computer moderated. It was close-ended.

== Gameplay ==
The game is a fantasy wargame with role-playing aspects. Games concluded when 52 turns elapsed or a player achieved 200 Political Status (PS) points. Player actions caused PS points to increase or decrease. Warfare, economics, and diplomacy were among elements of gameplay.

== Reception ==
Allan Stagg reviewed the game in the September–October 2000 issue of Flagship, stating that the game, has "great subtlety and depth." He pointed out various issues such as orders formatting challenges, but overall thought that with sufficient dedication, it was "a gaming experience to remember". In its Flagship Ratings for 2000, Flagship ranked Kings of Karadon 3rd in the Fantasy Wargames category after Middle Earth PBM and Overlord.

== See also ==
- List of play-by-mail games

== Bibliography ==
- Chisholm, Duncan (November–December 2001). "Kings of Karadon: A Beginner's Guide". Flagship. No. 94. p. 18.
- Chisholm, Duncan (April–May 2002). "Kings of Karadon: The Ancients' Return". Flagship. No. 96. pp. 18–19.
- Lomas, Tim (November–December 2000). "The Flagship Ratings for 2000". Flagship. No. 88. p. 34.
- Stagg, Allan (September–October 2000). "Kings of Karadon – A Deeper Look". Flagship. No. 87. pp. 13–17.
- Stagg, Allan (September–October 2001). "Kings of Karadon: The Finale!". Flagship. No. 93. p. 21.
