= S.A.B.R.E. =

Play-by-mail role-playing game

- Publishers: PACE
- Years active: 1987 to 1989
- Genres: Role-playing, medieval fantasy
- Languages: English
- Playing time: Fixed
- Materials required: Instructions, order sheets, turn results, paper, pencil
- Media type: Play-by-mail or email

S.A.B.R.E. (or SABRE) is a play-by-mail game published by PACE. In 1990, Flagship announced that the company had apparently closed. PACE owner Deke Parsons announced that the game ended in August 1989.

== Gameplay ==
S.A.B.R.E. was a play-by-mail game in which players acted as agents of the clandestine US government agency S.A.B.R.E. (Specially Authorized Bureau for Reaction to Extreme Emergencies). Players designed their characters with attributes such as "perception, agility, combat, endurance, and strength" along with one superpower.

== Reception ==
Stewart Wieck reviewed S.A.B.R.E. in White Wolf No. 10 (1988), rating it a 7 out of 10 and stated that "SABRE is an excellent interactive fiction (to borrow at computer term) PBM game. The setting is well thought and the quality of the writing in the 'chapters' is very passable." Bryon Fast reviewed the game in a 1988 issue of Paper Mayhem, stating that "the moderating was pretty good, and my mission was run interestingly, especially at the end".

== See also ==
- List of play-by-mail games
