= Global Supremacy =

1980s play-by-mail wargame

- Designers: Schubel & Son
- Publishers: Schubel & Son (US), Mitregames (UK)
- Years active: 1983 to unknown
- Genres: play-by-mail, wargame
- Languages: English
- Systems: computer moderated
- Players: 82
- Playing time: closed ended
- Materials required: Instructions, order sheets, turn results, paper, pencil
- Media type: Play-by-mail

Global Supremacy is a closed-end and computer-moderated play by mail (PBM) wargame. Schubel & Son published the game in the United States and Mitregames published a similar version in the United Kingdom.

== Development ==
Global Supremacy was a closed-ended PBM wargame. It was launched in 1983 with significant initial player interest. Schubel & Son published the game in the United States. By 1986, Mitregames was publishing a similar version in the United Kingdom. By 1987, Schubel & Son had published three versions of the game.

== Gameplay ==
The game was set in a post-World War III period in a multi-polar world without superpowers. There were 82 nations for players as well as multiple non-player nations and areas. The game used the earth's geography, and players could use an atlas as a playing aid. A wide variety of military units and weaponry, to include nuclear weapons, were available. Espionage and diplomacy were also elements of gameplay.

== Reception ==
John Muir reviewed the game in the Spring 1986 issue of Flagship. He noted some drawbacks such as the ability to pay for an advantage. He added that the game was "fun" and "always exciting."

== Reviews ==
- Breakout #16

== See also ==
- List of play-by-mail games

== Bibliography ==
- McCarthy, William; Tallman, Terry (Summer 1984). "Struggle for the Globe". Flagship. No. 3 (US ed.). p. 21.
- Muir, John (Spring 1986). "Global Supremacy: The Story So Far". Flagship. No. 10 (US ed.). pp. 8–9.
