= Survival Challenge =

Science fiction play-by-mail game

- Publishers: Mindgate
- Years active: 1987 to 1989
- Genres: Role-playing, science fiction
- Languages: English
- Materials required: Instructions, order sheets, turn results, paper, pencil
- Media type: Play-by-mail

Survival Challenge is a computer-moderated, science fiction play-by-mail (PBM) game. It was published by Mindgate in 1987. Players role-played customizable characters attempting to escape an alien planet with 19 other players. Game turns encompassed a 24-hour period and players had to survive 15 days to escape the planet. The most important part of the game was determining at the outset what equipment to carry and approach to take during play. It received multiple reviews in gaming magazines in 1988, praising its premise and noting its simplicity. One reviewer thought it too simple for serious gamers.

== History and development ==
Survival Challenge was a computer moderated, science fiction PBM game of survival published by Mindgate of Sacramento, CA. David Peterson was Mindgate's owner and gamemaster, which also published the PBM game Stars of the Dark Well. The company announced the game's launch in the March–April 1987 issue of Paper Mayhem. It announced in the July–August 1989 issue that it was ending play to focus on Stars of the Dark Well.

== Gameplay ==
Players role-played a customizable character trying to survive on an alien planet. There were up to 15 players per game. Each turn equaled one day. Gameplay occurred on a hex map. The purpose was to make it through 15 days and escape the planet. Players could also compete among each other through the game's point system.

Players determined at the outset what items to carry from a list of 33 (twenty kilograms max). These included food, water, weapons, and various types of survival gear. These initial choices were the most important part of the game.

Three general approaches were available to players: "total defensive, allied offensive, or lone offensive". Players had ten possible actions. These included do "First Aid", "Get" items, "Hunt", "Move", "Scan", "Sleep", "Track", and others. Combat among players was possible.

In the March–April 1988 issue of Paper Mayhem, Mindgate announced the conclusion of game No. 1 where only five of 20 players "made it onto the lander and escaped the clutches of the planet".

== Reception ==
Michael Horn reviewed the game in the March–April 1988 issue of Paper Mayhem. He thought it simple and fun, stating "All in all, 'Survival Challenge' is one of the better games of this type that I've seen and worth the turn fee." Tim Sullivan thought the game's premise interesting but stated, "Unfortunately, after the initial setup and first few turns, serious gamers will be disappointed by Survival Challenge". He thought the simplicity and value might appeal to some players.

== See also ==
- List of play-by-mail games

== Bibliography ==
- Horn, Michael (March–April 1988). "Take the "Survival Challenge"". Paper Mayhem. No. 29. p. 16.
- Editors (Summer 1987). "The Spokesemen Speak: Non SF Wargames: Survival Challenge". Flagship. No. 15 (U.S. ed.). p. 37.
- Mindgate (March–April 1987). "Gameline: Mindgate". Paper Mayhem. No. 23. p. 21.
- Mindgate (March–April 1988). "Gameline: Mindgate". Paper Mayhem. No. 29. p. 21.
- Mindgate (July–August 1989). "Gameline: Mindgate". Paper Mayhem. No. 37. p. 25.
- Sullivan, Tim (1988). "Survival Challenge". Flagship. No. 19. pp. 26–27.
