= Conquest of Insula II =

Play-by-mail fantasy wargame

- Designers: Jon Clemens
- Publishers: Clemens & Associates Inc. (US), ICBM (UK)
- Genres: fantasy wargame
- Languages: English
- Players: 10
- Playing time: 25 weeks
- Materials required: Instructions, order sheets, turn results, paper, pencil
- Media type: Play-by-mail

Conquest of Insula II is a closed-ended, computer-moderated, play-by-mail (PBM) fantasy wargame.

== History and development ==
Conquest of Insula II was a computer-moderated play-by-mail game published by Clemens & Associates Inc. It was medium complexity. It shared similarities with the PBM game Terra II, including turn reports and the combat system. (Note: Clemens & Associates launched Terra II in early 1983.)

== Gameplay ==
The setting for this wargame was medieval times. In each game, ten players on an island led villages with the title of Baron. Games occurred on separate islands, with names such as "Farraheim, Andarmark, Jiborokwi, Gizzenole, Karandala, and Raksharan." Players could conduct four actions per turn: "forestry, herding, mining, weapons making, armor making, siege equipment making, refining, ditch repairing, or wall repairing." Combat involved sending armies from villages, laying siege to another village, or battling another army. Various tactics were available. Movement occurred on a hex map of ten miles per hex.

Victory was achieved by conquering three villages or "kill[ing] the most enemy warriors" by game's end. Games lasted 25 weeks. Winners began the next game as a Count (and played it for free). A game ending in 1985 on the island of Matafunda was the first to end before 25 weeks, as a player conquered a third city.

== Reception ==
Bob McLain, editor of Gaming Universal, stated that the game was "tailor-made for battle lovers and armchair generals".

== See also ==
- List of play-by-mail games

== Bibliography ==
- Editors (November–December 1984). "PBM Update: Conquest of Insula II". Space Gamer. No. 71. pp. 37–38.
- Callaway, William (September–October 1984). "A Review of Conquest of Insula II". Paper Mayhem. No. 8. pp. 6–7.
- Editors (May–June 1985). "PBM Activity Corner: Conquest of Insula II". Paper Mayhem. No. 12. p. 30.
- Clemens, John (September–October 1984). "A Designer's View of Conquest of Insula II". Paper Mayhem. No. 8. p. 8.
- McLain, Bob (November–December 1983). "Gamealog: Conquest of Insula II". PBM Universal. No. 2. p. 43.
