= Supremacy (play-by-mail game) =

Play-by-mail game

Supremacy is a play-by-mail game published by Andon Games.

== Gameplay ==
Supremacy is a play-by-mail game version of the Supremacy board game in which sixteen players compete for global dominance on a world map segmented into land and sea territories. Each player begins with three Home Territories out of 136 possible land regions and expands their reach by deploying armies and navies to conquer additional ground and sea zones. After the fourth turn, players can invest in advanced technology to develop nuclear weapons, neutron bombs, and defensive satellites. While the bombs serve to obliterate rivals, satellites not only intercept incoming attacks but also provide valuable intelligence on other territories, both neutral and player-controlled. The game's economy hinges on three core resources—oil, minerals, and grain—which are produced by companies located across the map. These resources fuel all military production. Players can choose to hoard, trade, sell, or offload unwanted resource companies, adding an economic layer to the strategic warfare. Each turn, players collect tribute from their territories, using that income to fund further expansion, weapons development, and resource acquisition. Loans are available to bolster their financial position. With turns tracked on dedicated turnsheets, the game challenges players to balance economic management, military escalation, and timing in a race to wipe out all competition and rule the world.

== Reception ==
Stewart Wieck reviewed Supremacy in White Wolf #21 (June/July 1990), rating it a 4 out of 5 and stated that "This game has been very well-programmed and runs very smoothly. The turnsheets are well-organized and personalized order sheets are created as well. I have encountered a few errors on my turnsheet, but Andon Games responds very quickly to such problems. In all, I highly recommend it."

== Reviews ==
- Who's Who Among Play-By-Mail-Gamers
