= Death by Starlight =

Space combat play-by-mail game

- Publishers: Twin Engine Gaming
- Years active: mid-1998 to unknown
- Genres: Play-by-mail
- Languages: English
- Players: 10
- Playing time: fixed
- Materials required: Instructions, order sheets, turn results, paper, pencil

Death by Starlight is a closed-end, computer-moderated, play-by-mail (PBM) science fiction combat game run by Twin Engine Gaming in the 1990s.

== History and development ==
Death by Starlight was a closed-end, science fiction PBM game run by Twin Engine Gaming of San Jose, California. It was a game of tactical combat in a space arena. As of 1997, the game was in playtest. By 1998, playtesting was complete.

== Gameplay ==
Gameplay takes place in a televised space arena. Combat is part of a TriVideo game show called "Death by Starlight". Players chose from five ship types, varying in price, size, armaments, and other characteristics. These types included the Buffer, Dart, Diamond, Interrupter, and Spinner. Ships are crewed with 2–6 crew members, customizable at the start.

Ten teams per arena battled per game. The game's purpose was to amass the most victory points through combat.

== Reception and legacy ==
Reviewer Nathaniel Kelly reviewed the game in the November–December 1997 issue of Paper Mayhem. He stated, "I would highly recommend this game to my friends (and have!) and to you."

== See also ==
- List of play-by-mail games

== Bibliography ==
- John J., Gergel (January–February 1998). "Death By Starlight ... (May the Score Be With You)". Paper Mayhem. No. 88. p. 24.
- Dana, Holm (July–August 1997). "Tactics in Death by Starlight". Paper Mayhem. No. 85. pp. 8–9.
- Nathaniel, Kelly (November–December 1997). "Thirty Turns in the Death by Starlight Arena". Paper Mayhem. No. 87. pp. 8–10.
- Barry, Pidcock (January–February 1997). "Death by Starlight". Paper Mayhem. No. 82. pp. 24–26.
