= LandLords =

1984 fantasy play-by-mail game

Landlords
- Publishers: Quest Computer Services
- Years active: 1984 to unknown
- Genres: Fantasy
- Languages: English
- Systems: Computer-moderated
- Playing time: Fixed
- Materials required: Instructions, order sheets, turn results, paper, pencil
- Media type: Play-by-mail

LandLords is a fantasy play-by-mail game that was published by Quest Computer Services, beginning in 1984. The game was a computer moderated, closed-end game with the goal to retrieve treasures from castles in a medieval setting. The game received generally positive reviews in periodicals of the period, with specific mentions of its combat, maps, and low error rates on turn sheets.

== Development and gameplay ==
LandLords was a computer moderated play-by-mail game in which players compete to find the three treasures in the vaults of the 30 castles located in a barbaric land. The goal of the game was to be the first player to return three treasures to your fortress.

In 1985, the game had six maps available for players to choose from: Africa, Appalaccia, England, Europe, the Holy Land, and North America. Maps were updated every turn to aid players in planning their gameplay.

At the outset of the game, players had two computer-generated "tactical maps" with villages, castles, towers, and country locations to help plan the fortunes of the single country at their disposal. Players needed to manage a number of possessions and variables such as caravans, fortresses, and peasants to affect outputs such as gold income and food available. Advancing further into the game introduced additional elements, such as combat involving caravans and villages, as well as dragons which had "artifacts" that could aid players.

Orion Scott reviewed the game BattleLords in the January 1992 issue of Flagship, noting that it was upgraded from LandLords, which had been reviewed in issue #5 of Flagship.

== Reception ==
Richard Derham reviewed LandLords in The Space Gamer No. 76. Derham commented that "LandLords is slow-paced at the start, but it stands the test of time. And for those seeking combat, there's plenty of chance for that in the mid-game. A good addition to the family of PBM."

Michael Horn reviewed the game in the Nov/Dec 1985 issue of Paper Mayhem, a magazine for play-by-mail gamers, commenting positively on the ease of use the turn sheets, the fact that he had zero errors in sixteen turns of play (a first in nine years of PBM gameplay), simple rules, and maps which were "the best [he'd] seen in any game". Yet Horn thought the game was challenging enough for a wide range of players.

== See also ==
- List of play-by-mail games

== Bibliography ==
- Derham, Richard (Sep–Oct 1985). "Capsule Reviews". Space Gamer. No. 76. Steve Jackson Games. p. 45.
- Horn, Michael (November–December 1985). "Landlords — A Review". Paper Mayhem. No. 15. p. 8.
- Scott, Orian (January 1992). "BattleLords". Flagship. No. 35. p. 35.
