= War of the Dark God =

Play-by-mail role-playing game

- Publishers: Titan PBM, pbem.dk
- Languages: English
- Players: 16
- Playing time: Fixed, 24 turns
- Materials required: Instructions, order sheets, turn results
- Media type: Play-by-email
- Website: https://pbem.dk/wotdg/

War of the Dark God (or WotDG) is a closed-end, computer-moderated, play-by-mail fantasy wargame.

== History and development ==
War of the Dark God is a closed-ended, computer moderated play-by-email game. It is powered by a gaming engine called COSMOS. In 2001, it was published by Titan PBM in the United Kingdom and available for play by mail or email. In the same year, Morten Larsen offered the game for play in Denmark at pbem.dk along with Conquest of Cofain. Larsen's game was a more automated version than Titan PBM's.

== Gameplay ==
The game's setting is the world of Chard. Gameplay occurs on a hex map. Sixteen players total played eight "free nations" against eight "dark nations". Sides are played as teams. The "Minions of the Dark God" side comprises: The Vampire Lord, The Sorcerer, The Beast Master, The Snakemen, The Trolls, The Gnomes, The Pirates of Pyr, and The Queen of Wey, while "The Alliance" includes The Order of Quama, The High Elves, The Elves of Windwood, The Dwarves, The Druids, The Eastern Kingdom, The Northern Isles, and The Caliph of El-Sha'ai.

Combat occurs on land or sea, with two nations dominating the oceans.

Games last 24 turns.

== Reception ==
Wayne Morris reviewed the game in the January–February 2001 issue of Flagship. He gave it a positive review, saying he "had a lot of fun. I very much enjoyed just how closely you do have to work with your team mates, without worrying about being stabbed in the back". In the November–December 2001 issue of Flagship, War of the Dark God ranked No. 6 in the Fantasy Wargames category, with the highest value rating of the games in that category at 9 out of 10 points.

== See also ==
- List of play-by-mail games

== Bibliography ==
- Wasden, Jeremy (September–October 2000). "War of the Dark God". Flagship. No. 87. pp. 4–7.
- Morris, Wayne (January–February 2001). "War of the Dark God: A Beginner's Guide". Flagship. No. 89. pp. 22–23.
- Editors (March–April 2001). "Rumours from the Front: War of the Dark God". Flagship. No. 90. p. 39.
- Editors (May–June 2001). "The Spokesmen Speak: Email and Web-Based Gaming". Flagship. No. 91. p. 7.
- Lomas, Tim (November–December 2001). "The Flagship Ratings 2001: Fantasy Wargames". Flagship. No. 94. p. 7.
