= Realms of Sword and Thunder =

Play-by-mail game

Realms of Sword and Thunder (or ROSAT) is a play-by-mail game that was published by Empire Games, Inc.

== Development ==
The fantasy game was created by Glenn Holliday and Chris Peterson and launched in 1982. It was an open-ended game that, in 1984, was human moderated with computer assistance.

== Gameplay ==
Realms of Sword and Thunder was a play-by-mail game that was moderated by a combination of both computers and humans by Empire Games of Denver, Colorado, combining both roleplaying gameplay as well as tactical economics. The game's setting is 5th century England. Through the game, players encounter "all the myths and legends of antiquity" including unicorns, dragons, centaurs, and sorcerers.

The player first chooses one of eleven races for their home community, and then one of seven professions for their leader (berserker, knight, druid, priest, sorcerer, witch doctor, or thief). The game was two-pronged: the leader wandered the countryside, exploring new lands and experiencing adventures, while the player tried to increase the prosperity of the home community by teaching the townspeople new crafts and skills such as making armor, weapons and boats. Once the townspeople had mastered a new skill, the new product was then available for use and trade.

== Reception ==
In the April 1983 edition of Dragon (Issue 72), Michael Gray described his experience as a leader who was a witch doctor, and called the PBM game "intriguing". He concluded "I feel like I have gotten my money's worth so far."

Mike Scheid reviewed the game in the Nov/Dec 1984 issue of Paper Mayhem. He included as positives the "wide open" style of play that allowed great freedom of action, a useful newsletter, and a modified "Excalibur" contest. A negative was the relatively high cost. Scheid concluded that "the good far outweighed the bad" in this game, noting it was nearly as good as "the best role-playing campaigns" he had seen, and better than many.

Jim Gould reviewed Realms of Sword and Thunder in The Space Gamer No. 73. Gould commented that "Doing the unusual is more than half the fun, and in Realms of Sword and Thunder, the fun just keeps coming. I unhesitatingly recommend ROSAT as the best fantasy PBM I've seen."

== Other reviews ==
- "Commercial PBM Scene", Cathy's Ramblings, Issue 10 (October 1984), p. 5

== See also ==
- List of play-by-mail games
