= Space Combat (play-by-mail game) =

Space Combat is a play-by-mail game that was published by Twin Engine Gaming. It was computer moderated.

== Gameplay ==
Space Combat was a game of tactical space combat in which 10 players fight in arena combat to win the rights to control an area of space that was just discovered. The game is focused on tactical combat with little diplomacy. Each player controlled a "parent", or a "big organic factory and fortress", which control the players "offspring", or troops. While players had to plan the tactics associated with negotiating and fighting within a 35 x 35 gridspace arena, they also had to consider the strategic aspects of the game which included parent production of modules which affected actions of offspring and the parent, as well as planning for offspring type generation. The overall goal is to acquire sufficient victory points to win the game.

== Reception ==
J.W. Akers-Sassaman reviewed Space Combat in Space Gamer/Fantasy Gamer No. 85. Akers-Sassaman commented that "an innovative, quick-paced and overall very satisfying tactical space game that is one of the best in this universe, or any other, for that matter."

Reviewer Stephan Wieck opined that:

Overall, Space Combat is a nice game that's well-moderated and fun. Don't expect anything more out of the game than the tactical combat, but you can expect plenty of that. The game takes less than a year from start to finish and has pretty simple rules, so it's good for PBM beginners, though you should be wary of Space Combat veterans showing up in your game arena.

Challenge reviewed the game and stated that "This game is great for anyone interested in trying out a play-by-mail game for the first time—it is clearly written, reasonably priced, reliably run, and fun."

== See also ==
- List of play-by-mail games

== Bibliography ==
- Akers-Sassaman, J.W. (January–February 1989). "Capsule Reviews". Space Gamer/Fantasy Gamer. No. 85. World Wide Wargames. p. 56.
- Editors (1989). "Reviews". Challenge. No. 40. GDW Games.
- Wieck, Stephan (June–July 1991). "PBM Corner: Space Combat". White Wolf Magazine. No. 27. pp. 49–50.
