= Portinium =

Play-by-mail science fiction game

- Publisher title
- Other names: Portinium Hi-Tech, Portinium Lo-Tech, Portinium II
- Publishers: Enchanted Horizons
- Years active: 1992 to unknown
- Genres: science fiction, play-by-mail
- Languages: English
- Systems: computer-moderated
- Players: 50
- Playing time: Fixed
- Materials required: Instructions, order sheets, turn results, paper, pencil
- Media type: Play-by-mail or email

Portinium (also Portinium Hi-Tech or Portinium Lo-Tech) is a closed-end, computer-moderated, science fiction play-by-mail (PBM) wargame. Enchanted Horizons, owned by John James, published the game in 1992. Soon after release, the publisher ceased operations, eventually playtesting and releasing Portinium II in 1994. 50 players per game vied for victory on the planet of Glaceria by battling across four time periods, or one period in the Hi-tech or Lo-tech games. The game received generally positive reviews in gamer magazines in the early 1990s.

== History and development ==
Portinium was a closed-end, strategic science fiction PBM game published by Enchanted Horizons of Spokane, Washington. It was computer moderated. Gameplay began in 1992. (Note: Reprogramming delayed release for a year.) In 1992, turns ran monthly and cost $20, which reviewer John C. Muir thought was a "bargain". In its first year, the publisher made two variants available, Portinium Hi-Tech and Lo-Tech, both versions with no time travel. (Note: These versions allowed up to 99 players.) These were lower cost variants which allowed new players an inexpensive way to test the game. The rulebook was 198 pages with short stories, poems, and full of artwork. Reviewer John C. Muir commented, "I have never before seen a game developed to this depth." After about six months of initial gameplay, the publisher ceased operations and unsuccessfully attempted to sell the game. By 1994, the owner, John James, had playtested and relaunched the game as Portinium II.

== Gameplay ==
The game was set on the planet of Glaceria. It spanned four time periods ranging from the distant past to the future. (Note: The four periods were "Stone Age, Medieval, Modern and Future".) The periods were accessed by gates called "Portiniums." Each period used the same size game map of 81×81 sectors. John Muir described the game's size as "much larger" than other closed-end games he had played. The publisher advertised that the game comprised more than 24,000 sectors.

Up to fifty players per game vied for victory. Elements of gameplay included cities, characters, divisions, and espionage units. Players began with a city and forces in each of the epochs. The game's purpose was to acquire four engine pods from a spaceship stranded on Glaceria that were scattered across the periods. The four final players entered a final victory scenario. Four players could be winners at the end. In Portinium II, players began with elements in the earliest two periods.

== Reception ==
Bob Bost reviewed the game in the November 1992 issue of Flagship. He stated that it was "a fun wargame for those who like detail". He observed as drawbacks the game's detailed, labor-intensive nature and an issue related to home city location. he felt players should "discount the time travel and role-playing aspects". John C. Muir reviewed the game in the September–October 1992 issue of Paper Mayhem. He recommended it "for the player who likes complexity and a challenge". Portinium won Best PBM Game at Andcon 1992.

== See also ==
- List of play-by-mail games

== Bibliography ==
- Bost, Bob (November 1992). "Portinium: War Across the Ages". Flagship. No. 40 (U.S. ed.). pp. 8–9.
- Editors (November–December 1992). "Where We're Headed". Paper Mayhem. No. 57. p. 3.
- Enchanted Horizons (September–October 1992). "Portinium [Ad]". Paper Mayhem. No. 56. p. 7.
- Muir, John C. (September–October 1992). "Snapshot Review: Portinium". Paper Mayhem. No. 56. pp. 6–9.
- Muir, John C. (November–December 1992). "Opening Strategy in Portinium". Paper Mayhem. No. 57. pp. 12–16, 18.
- Muir, John C. (March–April 1994). "It's Back! A Review of Portinium II". Paper Mayhem. No. 65. pp. 7–8.
