= Krahlizek =

Play-by-mail wargame

- Publishers: Aggressive Addiction Games (US), Phildee Enterprises (UK)
- Genres: wargame, play-by-mail
- Languages: English
- Materials required: Instructions, order sheets, turn results, paper, pencil
- Media type: Play-by-mail or email

Krahlizek is a closed-ended, computer moderated, play-by-mail (PBM) wargame.

== History and development ==
Krahlizek was a closed-ended play-by-mail game. Aggressive Addiction Games published the game in the United States, while Phildee Enterprises published it in the United Kingdom.

== Gameplay ==
Krahlizek was a game of conquest. Players won by controlling the most territory at the end of the game. Games typically lasted 21–30 turns. Combat was a key element of the game, with economics, spying, and politics also factors.

== Reception ==
Krahlizek: The Last Battle (Version 4.0) was reviewed in White Wolf #47 (Sept., 1994) which stated that "Problems aside, the game's turn costs are very reasonable, especially when you consider the color game map and laser printed information you receive with each turn report."

Nick Palmer reviewed the game in a 1995 issue of Flagship, noting it was a good game for novices. He stated that "it's well-finished: almost entirely bug-free, well-balanced, exciting, and both victory nor defeat are rarely quite certain".

== See also ==
- List of play-by-mail games

== Bibliography ==
- Herriman, Jack (November–December 1994). "Krahhzek: Simple System, Subtle Design". Flagship. No. 52 (US ed.). pp. 28–29.
- Palmer, Nicky (January–February 1995). "Krahhzek: The Scorched Earth Strategy". Flagship. No. 53. U.S. Edition. pp. 17–19.
