= Gameplan (game) =

Play-by-mail sports game

- Designers: Peter Calcraft
- Publishers: Clemens & Associates, Andon Games
- Years active: ~1989 to unknown
- Genres: sports
- Languages: English
- Playing time: Fixed
- Materials required: Instructions, order sheets, turn results, paper, pencil
- Media type: Play-by-mail or email

Gameplan is a closed-end, computer-moderated, play-by-mail game.

== History and development ==
Gameplan was designed by Peter Calcraft who published the game in the United Kingdom. By 1989, Clemens & Associates was running the game in the United States. Gameplay differed between the UK and US versions. By 1991 Andon Games was running the game.

== Gameplay ==
Gameplan is a PBM American football sports game. The goal of the game was to win the Paper Super Bowl similar to an NFL football season. Players establish team rosters and train teams before the season. According to reviewer Tim Sullivan, the game "provides a realistic play-by-play account for each match, describing the relative success or failure for every play during a game". Success is based both on player development and good game-calling. Besides multiple defensive options, players have seven available run plays and nine pass plays for offense. According to Sullivan, "Diplomacy isn't required, though it is encouraged."

== Reception ==
Alan Heise reviewed the game in the May–June 1993 issue of Paper Mayhem, noting its multiple facets and stating, "That is what intrigues me about gameplan, especially the advanced leagues." Tim Sullivan said in Flagship that, "If you are a football fan who always wanted to coach your own team, Gameplan comes closest to the 'real thing' than any other simulation today." Gary Vandegrift reviewed the game in a 1991 issue of Paper Mayhem, rating it a 9.5 out of 10 points." He gave it maximum marks for "Game design, moderation, rules, [and] depth" while reducing the overall rating due to the relative low level of required diplomacy.

== See also ==
- List of play-by-mail games

== Bibliography ==
- Havenhand, Glenn (1989). "Winning Gameplan". PBM Scroll. No. 12. p. 51.
- Heise, Alan (May–June 1993). "Gameplan: Draft Day & Post Season Play". Paper Mayhem. No. 60. pp. 30, 32.
- Mowka, Stephen R. (March–April 1991). "Gameplan, PBM American Football at Its Best". Paper Mayhem. No. 47. pp. 23–25.
- Sullivan, Tim (February 1989). "Gameplan: Not Just Another Die Roller". Flagship. No. 20 (US ed.). pp. 12–13.
- Vandegrift, Gary (March–April 1991). "The Big Game". Paper Mayhem. No. 47. p. 25.
