= Eclipse (play-by-mail game) =

Play-by-mail science fiction game

- Publishers: Midnight Games
- Years active: ~1987 to unknown
- Languages: English
- Players: 12–20
- Playing time: Fixed
- Materials required: Instructions, order sheets, turn results, paper, pencil
- Media type: Play-by-mail

Eclipse is a computer moderated, space-based play-by-mail (PBM) game. It was published by Midnight Games. 12–20 players per game vied for domination of a galaxy on a game map comprising 180–220 star systems.

== History and development ==
Eclipse was a computer-moderated science fiction PBM game. It was published by Midnight Games of Medford, Oregon, run by Jim and Lynee Landes. Eclipse was an introductory PBM game.

== Gameplay ==
Each game had 12–20 players. Players won by "conquering half the galaxy plus one world". Gameplay occurred within a two-dimensional 30×60 grid map that held the 180–220 star systems.

== Reception ==
Mike Hall reviewed the game in a November–December 1988 issue of Paper Mayhem. He praised the gamemasters and publisher's player support during issues during his gameplay but did not recommend the game for novices. He stated, "A player with moderate experience, entering the game on a caveat emptor basis, playing for its innovative features and willing to accept the games shortcomings, might find it an interesting experience."

== See also ==
- List of play-by-mail games

== Bibliography ==
- Editors (1988). "Spotlight on Computer-Moderated SF Games: Eclipse". Flagship. No. 19. pp. 27–28.
- Hall, Mike (November–December 1988). "Eclipse, An Introductory Space Game?". Paper Mayhem. No. 33. pp. 6, 8.
- Townsend, Jim (March–April 1987). "Eclipse – A True Introductory PBM Game". Paper Mayhem. No. 23. pp. 20–21.
