= Lords of Destiny =

Space role-playing game

- Publishers: Maelstrom Games
- Years active: Early 1990s to post 1997
- Genres: Space fantasy, play-by-mail
- Languages: English
- Systems: Computer-moderated
- Players: 12
- Playing time: Fixed
- Materials required: Instructions, order sheets, turn results, paper, pencil
- Media type: Play-by-mail or email

Lords of Destiny was a play-by-mail game created by Maelstrom Games in the early 1990s. It was a "low to moderately complex" game of space conquest for twelve players involving characters, fleets and space battle. The game also injected humor into its turn results, and involved "moderate diplomacy" and "minimal time demands" for players. Normal games lasted between 25 and 29 turns, randomly determined by a computer.

== Development ==
As of 1993, Lords of Destiny came in a basic version for beginners and a complete version for more advanced players. Jonathan Walton noted in a 1993 review in Paper Mayhem, a magazine for play-by-mail games, that Lords of Destiny was Maelstrom Games' first game, and that, although customer service had been good and the owner was a long-time play-by-mail gamer, the turn sheets were cluttered and required some improvements which had recently been made.

== Gameplay ==
Lords of Destiny's central focus was on combat and alliances, although it was not focused on building an empire through gaining land or economic growth. Characters were a key aspect of the game, although players did not start with any characters. Characters included: admirals, diplomats, economists, heroes, generals, governors, psionics, scientists, and spies. "Legendary Characters", or "Lords of Destiny", were named after the game and had special abilities. They were achieved after a character became level 10 in a field, although there was only one Lord of Destiny possible per field per game. The game's Victory Conditions were primarily combat-related along with some being resource-related.

== Reception ==
Lords of Destiny won the Origins Award for Best New Play-by-Mail Game of 1992. The game placed sixth in the Best Play By Mail Games of 1994 list in Paper Mayhem, a magazine for play by mail gamers. In 1993, reviewer Jonathan Walton opined that, although Lords of Destiny wasn't the most modern or innovative game, "Is it a good, solid, Play-By-Mail game that gives you an excellent value for your money? In my opinion, resoundingly YES."

Dr. Robert J. Bunker reviewed Lords of Destiny (2nd Edition) in White Wolf Inphobia #55 (May, 1995) and stated that "All in all, this is an excellent strategic space game and deserves its ORIGINS award. It's targeted toward the average gamer and provides a great value for the turn cost, especially in the end game when large positions develop."

== See also ==
- List of play-by-mail games

== Bibliography ==
- Chenevert, Phil (May–June 1993). "Lords of Destiny: A Peek Behind the Scenes". Paper Mayhem. No. 60. p. 8–15.
- Christy, Cole (May–June 1997). "Character Development in Lords of Destiny". Paper Mayhem. No. 84. p. 6.
- Olson, Carl J. (July–August 1994). "Lords of Destiny – Another Point of View". Paper Mayhem. No. 67. p. 8.
- "Origins Award Winners (1992)". Academy of Adventure Gaming Arts & Design. Archived from the original on 2008-04-15.
- Paper Mayhem (January–February 1995). "Where We're Heading". Paper Mayhem. No. 70. p. 2.
- Walton, Jonathan (January–February 1993). "Lords of Destiny: An Initial Look". Paper Mayhem. No. 58. p. 42.
