= Galactic Power =

Play-by-mail space-based role-playing game

- Publishers: Vigard Simulations
- Years active: ~1984 to unknown
- Genres: Role-playing, space-based
- Languages: English
- Players: 16
- Playing time: Fixed
- Materials required: Instructions, order sheets, turn results, paper, pencil
- Media type: Play-by-mail or email

Galactic Power is a closed-end, play-by-mail game. It was published by Vigard Simulations.

== History and development ==
Galactic Power was published by Vigard Simulations. The publisher cancelled pending release of a Vietnam PBM game in 1984 to focus on Galactic Power. Vigard Simulations placed a game advertisement in the September–October 1984 issue of Paper Mayhem. The game is closed-ended.

== Gameplay ==
Galactic Power was a space-based game of expansion and conquest. Sixteen players began on a home world with some ships and funds. Players could customize their ships.

Gameplay occurred on an 11 × 14 hex map with 230 star systems. Games lasted 25 turns. The purpose was to control the most systems that generated wealth, or Monetary Units (MUs).

== Reception ==
Guy Fuson reviewed the game in the Summer 1985 issue of Flagship, following the game's playtest period. He stated that "I can recommend Galactic Power to players who enjoy empire building and diplomacy but do not have the time for more involved games such as Beyond The Stellar Empire or Empyrean Challenge. D. S. Ross and Vigard Simulations have produced a quality product and interested players should feel confident of getting their money's worth." Alexander Sheldon reviewed the game in the January–February 1986 issue of Paper Mayhem He stated that it was "enjoyable" and that it "is a deceptively simple game, with enough complexity to appeal" to experienced players. Stewart Wieck reviewed the game in the June–July 1990 issue of White Wolf. He rated the game at 3 of 5 points for Materials and 4 of 5 points for Moderation, Strategy, and Diplomacy. He rated it overall at 4 of 5 points.

== See also ==
- List of play-by-mail games

== Bibliography ==
- Editors (Winter 1984). "The Spokesmen Speak...". Flagship. No. 5. p. 40.
- Fuson, Guy (Summer 1985). "Galactic Power". Flagship. No. 7. pp. 25–27.
- Sheldon, Alexander (January–February 1986). "Opening Strategy In Galactic Power". Paper Mayhem. No. 16. p. 9.
- Wieck, Stewart (June–July 1990). "Play-by-Mail Game Reviews: Galactic Power". White Wolf Magazine. No. 21. pp. 23–24.
