= Austerlitz (play-by-email game) =

Play-by-mail wargame

- Title image
- Publishers: Supersonic Games (Originally TBA Games), Quirxel (Germany), Sphinx (Spain), SSV (Austria)
- Years active: 1984 to unknown
- Genres: wargame, play-by-mail
- Languages: English
- Systems: mail
- Players: 12
- Playing time: 18–24 months
- Materials required: Instructions, order sheets, turn results, paper, pencil
- Media type: Play-by-mail or email
- Website: https://www.austerlitzpbem.com/

Austerlitz is a closed-ended, computer moderated, play-by-email (PBM) wargame. It is published by Supersonic Games.

== History and development ==
Austerlitz is a closed-ended, computer moderated play-by-email game originally published by TBA Games. By 2002, TBA had changed their name to Supersonic Games. It was also available in Germany, licensed to Quirxel Games, and Spain, at Sphinx. By 2003, it was also offered in Austria by SSV. As of 2023 the gamemaster is Sam McMillan.

== Gameplay ==
The game's setting was the Napoleonic-era. 16 players chose from the same number of countries centered on Europe for game start in January 1808. Politics, economics, and naval and land warfare were key elements of gameplay.

The game included major battles that players managed in detail while smaller battles were described in turn results. The purpose was to be one of the final three positions, whether singly or part of an alliance.

== Reception ==
Games Without Frontiers conducted a PBM game survey in their March 1997 issue, receiving 425 responses. Austerlitz ranked No. 2, just after En Garde, out of a total of 128 games. The game also won best Historical Wargame in Leeds, England.

== See also ==
- List of play-by-mail games

== Bibliography ==
- Bates, Phil (September–October 2003). "Austerlitz: Russia". Flagship. No. 104. p. 16.
- Blair, David (February–March 2002). "Austerlitz: Fight the Good Fight". Flagship. No. 95. pp. 12–13.
- Editors (August–September 2002). "Newsdesk: Games in German". Flagship. No. 98. p. 5.
- Editors (March 1997). "PBM Survey". Games Without Frontiers. No. 1. pp. 5–6.
- Hill, Adam (March 1997). "Austerlitz". Games Without Frontiers. No. 1. pp. 12–13.
- Supersonic Games (2021). "About Austerlitz".
- Whittaker, Mark (Summer 1995). "Austerlitz – The Napoleonic Wargame". PBMZine. No. 1. p. 26.
