= The Land of Karrus =

Play-by-mail fantasy game

- Other names: Land of Karrus
- Designers: Jean Brown
- Publishers: Paper Tigers, Fallen Angel PBM
- Genres: play-by-mail, science fiction, fantasy
- Languages: English
- Playing time: Fixed
- Materials required: Instructions, order sheets, turn results, paper, pencil
- Media type: Play-by-mail or email

The Land of Karrus (or Land of Karrus) is a closed-end, computer moderated play-by-mail (PBM) game. It was published by Paper Tigers of Glendora, CA.

== History and development ==
Jean Brown designed Land of Karrus, with Wesley J. Peters as the programmer. Play began in 1990. The game was a computer-moderated, closed end, role-playing PBM game. It had both science fiction and fantasy elements. The publisher, Paper Tigers, also produced a game newsletter called Karrutian Kapsule. By 1996, the publisher was Fallen Angel PBM.

== Gameplay ==
The Land of Karrus is played on the planet of Karrus. Exploration, economics, and combat were elements of gameplay. Players roleplayed groups from three available races, the Utarians, Karrutians, and the Heqi.

The game's goal was to become Wise, and the game featured Quests for Wisdom. Wisdom levels range from one to seven.

== Reception ==
Stewart Wieck reviewed the game in the December 1990 – January 1991 issue of White Wolf magazine. Out of a possible 5, he rated it a 2 for Strategy, 3 for game Materials, and 4 for Moderation and Diplomacy. Hi overall rating was a 3 of 5.

== See also ==
- List of play-by-mail games

== Bibliography ==
- Brown, Jean (July–August 1990). "Moderator Notes – Land of Karrus". American Gamer. No. 1. pp. 36–37.
- Cameron, George (July–August 1996). "Land of Karrus – 150 Turns". Paper Mayhem. No. 64. pp. 13–14.
- Pompillio, Frank (January–February 1991). "The Utrian Way – The Land of Karrus". American Gamer. No. 2. pp. 20–21.
- Smith, Richard L. (May–June 1990). "The Land of Karrus: A Heqi View". Paper Mayhem. No. 42. pp. 60–61.
- Wieck, Stewart (December 1990 – January 1991). "PBM Corner: The Land of Karrus". White Wolf. No. 24. pp. 58, 60.
