= Outer Reaches =

Outer Reaches is a play-by-mail game published by Earnshaw Enterprises.

== Gameplay ==
Outer Reaches is a play-by-mail game of interstellar strategy in which each player commands a distinct alien race with unique motivations for expansion, commerce, and exploration—or, in the case of the Saurians, destruction. Humans specialize in colonization, Larvanoids excel at mining, Avarians are explorers of the stars, and Botanons dominate trade. Players earn or lose points based on race-specific objectives and behaviors, with the first to reach 10,000 points declared the winner. For instance, Humans gain substantial points for founding new colonies, while Avarians are penalized for deploying unwieldy Battleships incompatible with their nomadic ethos. The game unfolds on a 30×40 square grid divided into forty-eight 5×5 subregions, each labeled with letter-number coordinates for navigation. Sectors may contain stars and up to two habitable planets. To colonize, players must transport settlers via designated ships—each with limited movement range per turn. Movement within a sector is unrestricted, but diagonal movement across the grid is prohibited due to its square-based design. Ship classes range from agile destroyers to heavily armed Battleships and can be built in five sizes, with larger ships offering increased carrying capacity and combat potential. Each vessel operates independently, adding a tactical layer to fleet movement and positioning.

== Reception ==
Stewart Wieck reviewed Outer Reaches in White Wolf #22 (Aug./Sept., 1990), rating it a 3 out of 5 and stated that "Outer Reaches is a well-run space game. It doesn't offer anything radically original, but play is smooth once you have gotten used to the strange sector map."
