= Arcadia (play-by-mail game) =

Arcadia is a play-by-mail game published by Jade Games.

== Gameplay ==
Arcadia is a fantasy play-by-mail wargame moderated by computer and structured around fixed deadlines. Players assume the role of commanders, each controlling a city and three armies, with the goal of conquering rival cities. Success depends not just on military might but also on strategic trading—particularly in grain, which is converted into gold to fund weapons, recruit troops, and sustain forces. Exploration is handled through Wozem birds, which scout locations and report back, unless intercepted by Roc birds that capture them and turn them against their original owners. Once an enemy city is located, players can choose from various diplomatic or aggressive actions. The rulebook is intentionally vague, encouraging players to learn through experience. The game rewards alliances and tactical cunning, making it ideal for those who enjoy negotiation, betrayal, and strategic maneuvering.

== Reception ==
Wayne Bootleg reviewed Arcadia for Adventurer magazine and stated that "If you like double-dealing, back stabbing and being tactically devious, then this game is for you. I particularity liked the map that is supplied, as it also makes a nice poster for your bedroom wall. You get little round sticky labels too!!"
