= The Glory of Kings =

Play by mail game

The Glory of Kings (also known as La Gloire Du Roi) is a play-by-mail game run by Agema Publications.

The game is an example of counterfactual history, allowing players to play out historical questions.

== Gameplay ==
Each turn, players supply written orders to the referee (known as Agema) including troop movements and dispositions, state expenditure and diplomatic activity. Players write letters to each other on behalf of their characters. These actions are bound only by historical reality, which means that the game is enormously rich in detail. In turn the referee provides players with an in-game newsletter which outlines the known activities of all players and provides a forum, as an in-game newspaper, by which players can make public statements.

Wars are fought on land and sea, and players command armies based initially on the armies of the period of the War of the Spanish Succession. The armies and their tactics develop over time as players introduce new tactics and inventions such as Carronade Frigates. Players can decide whether they want to focus on building up power by peaceful development and trade or military conquest.

Players often play historical characters such as King Charles II of Spain. Players can employ Vauban to help them construct Vauban-style Star fort or Sir Isaac Newton to help make technological advances.

Some player positions are expected to be played independently (for example the Kingdom of Spain) and others like the positions in the Polish–Lithuanian Commonwealth or the Ottoman Empire are expected to benefit from co-operation with other players who are directly linked by constitution or by a single sovereign (such as the Sultan of the Ottoman Empire). However whether or not players ultimately choose to co-operate is a matter for them.

== Awards ==
The Glory of Kings won the Best Historical Wargame 1998, 2000 and 2001.

== Bibliography ==
- Schwark, Ry (October 2015). "The Glory of Kings: One Player's View of Agema Games' TGOK". Suspense & Decision. No. 11. pp. 56–57.
- Schwark, Ry (August 2016). "Agema Games' The Glory of Kings: Burma Start Up Turn". Suspense & Decision. No. 13. pp. 34–43.
