= Ruler of the Galactic Web =

Fantasy role-playing game

- Publishers: Quail Canyon, Unicorm
- Years active: 1990 to unknown
- Genres: science fiction
- Languages: English
- Materials required: Instructions, order sheets, turn results, paper, pencil
- Media type: Play-by-mail

Ruler of the Galactic Web is a play-by-mail game published by Quail Canyon System.

== Gameplay ==
Ruler of the Galactic Web is a play-by-mail game of conquest in space. In 1991 it was published in the US by Quail Canyon Systems and in the UK by Unicorn Games. It is a closed ended PBM game set on a 30 x 30 map. Reviewer Steve Dickson stated that the game had "planet conquering, industry and resource management, and (of course) diplomacy and aggression towards other would-be Rulers".

== Reception ==
Stewart Wieck reviewed Ruler of the Galactic Web in White Wolf #21 (June/July 1990), rating it a 3 out of 5 and stated that "Web is a good game with many fine qualities, but it's too frustrating for me to enjoy completely. If you like complexities and can handle the heartache, this is the game for you."

== Reviews ==
- Paper Mayhem

== Bibliography ==
- Dickson, Steve (April 1991). "Ruler of the Galactic Web". Flagship. No. 31 (US ed.). p. 16–17.
