= Star Cluster One =

Science fiction play-by-mail game

- Designers: Steve Jackson
- Publishers: The Buchanan Company
- Years active: 1981 to unknown
- Genres: science fiction, space opera
- Languages: English
- Playing time: Fixed
- Materials required: Instructions, order sheets, turn results, paper, pencil
- Media type: Play-by-mail or email

Star Cluster One is a play-by-mail game published by The Buchanan Company.

== History and development ==
The game was designed by Steve Jackson.

== Gameplay ==
Star Cluster One was a game in which players built bases and ships to take over a star cluster recovering from a recent super-nova. Exploration using diplomacy and intrigue to discover habitable worlds was part of gameplay.

== Reception ==
W.G. Armintrout reviewed Star Cluster One in The Space Gamer No. 48. Armintrout commented that "I'm not particularly pleased with Star Cluster One. In my opinion it could use a shot of action [...] and better handling by Buchanan. Right now it is a slow game with a long turn-around time - hardly the perfect combination. Not recommended."
