= Raumkrieg =

Space-based play-by-mail wargame

Raumkrieg is a play-by-mail wargame that was published by Flying Buffalo.

== Gameplay ==
Raumkrieg is a play-by-mail game set in a two-dimensional space arena, where five to nine players command their fleets to destroy each other.

== Reception ==
W. G. Armintrout reviewed Raumkrieg in The Space Gamer No. 19. Armintrout commented that "Raumkrieg has the advantage of being a reasonably simple game."
