= Muskets and Mules =

Muskets and Mules is a play-by-mail game published by Historical Engineering.

== Gameplay ==
Muskets and Mules is a game in which a play-by-mail wargame is set during the Napoleonic Wars in north-central Europe between 1805 and 1809. Players assume control of one of the major historical nations and engage in strategic military campaigns via postal correspondence. The game uses fixed deadlines of 14 or 21 days.

== Reception ==
Wayne Bootleg reviewed Muskets and Mules for Adventurer magazine and stated that "Although pricey, it is immense value for money. The rule book alone is one of the best I have ever seen, and it tackles a complicated subject with great ease and clarity. The overwhelming feeling of involvement jumps out of the rulebook and grabs you by the throat. There is an atmosphere in the game which is realistic and quite moving."
