= World War IV (play-by-mail game) =

Play-by-mail game

World War IV is a play-by-mail game published by IFH Games.

== Gameplay ==
World War IV is a game in which a near future strategy wargame involves a world ruined after a Third World War.

== Reception ==
Dr. Robert J. Bunker reviewed World War IV (Third Edition) in White Wolf Inphobia #55 (May, 1995) and stated that "In summation, World War IV is a very complicated and detailed PBM game that deserves high praise for both its depth of design and dollar value. Even though the game is complex, the rules are simple and novice players can jump in without any trouble."

Bob McLain reviewed World War IV in White Wolf Inphobia #57 (July, 1995) and stated that "I think that uncertainty in a game should come from the relative strengths and weaknesses of the players, not an obscure combat system. In my ideal game, each player knows what each of his forces can do; if he can see enemy forces, he may even know what they can do, but he doesn't know what they will do. That's the human factor, and that's why I play games by mail: to out guess other people."
