= The Hunting (play-by-mail game) =

The Hunting is a play-by-mail game published by D.M.C Games.

== Gameplay ==
The Hunting is a game in which

a play-by-mail game is set on the post-apocalyptic planet Felbin, where players begin in the walled city of Endlethorn—now repurposed as a massive prison. The city, enclosed by towering walls and accessible only through twelve gates, houses both original citizens and a flood of criminals, creating a chaotic and lawless environment. Players choose to play either as Exterminators, government-sanctioned vigilantes equipped with weapons, armor, and a helpful AI called Sweet Home, or as Criminals, who begin with minimal resources and must survive in hostile conditions. Gameplay involves bounty hunting, combat, and strategic upgrades, with the option to spend creation points on mutations ranging from telekinesis to extra limbs—some of which may be dangerous to the user. The setting blends sci-fi and historical motifs, with zones resembling ancient Rome or the Wild West.

== Publication history ==
A promotional offer was extended to Adventurer readers for a discounted start-up pack and five free first turns in The Hunting, while the first five readers to write to the publisher would get the start-up and first five rounds for free.

== Reception ==
Wayne Bootleg reviewed The Hunting for Adventurer magazine and stated that "The game is really interesting with over 750, very detailed, A4 maps to collect, over 100 weapons to use (all weapons have a corresponding token telling you all the details you need to know i.e. reliability, damage inflicted, size etc.) as well as over 1000 non player characters to interact with."
