= The Ashes of Empire =

1982 video game

- Developer(s): Mike Costello and Harald Topf
- Platform(s): VC20, C64, C128, Amiga 500, Atari ST, DOS, Windows
- Release: 1982
- Genre(s): Turn-based strategy

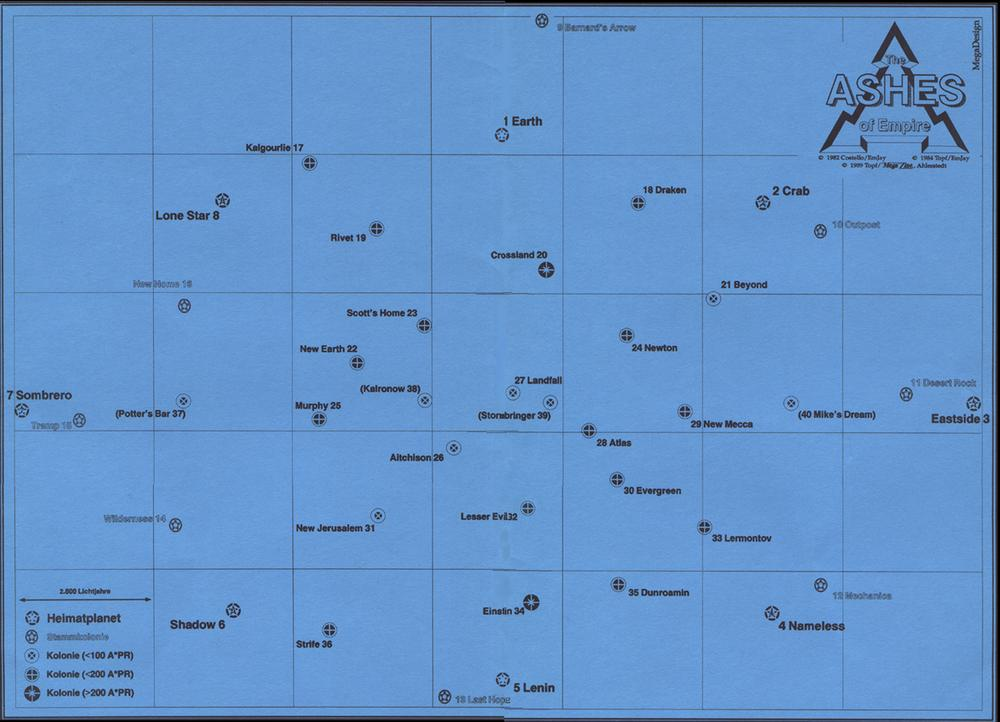
Map with 40 planets

The Ashes of Empire is a turn-based strategy game, which appeared in several adaptions as a play-by-mail game or online game.

The game starts on an imaginary map with fixed stars. Each player has home planets and has to conquer the universe. Like in Master of Orion each player produces with his industries different units for defence and attack. The players can form alliances or attack each other. The game ends when the game reached a previously defined total of rounds or a player rules over a great part of the universe.

The game was founded as a two-player version of the Cold War and expanded to a game with up to eight starting positions with a universe of 40 planets. Since 1982, the game has been compiled for VC20, C64, C128, Amiga 500, Atari ST, DOS and Windows. The main programmers were Mike Costello and Harald Topf.
