= Scramble (play-by-mail game) =

Scramble is a play-by-mail game published by Furypost Games.

== Gameplay ==
Scramble is a ten-player, computer-moderated play-by-mail modern warfare strategy game in which the players deplete national treasuries in the first turn to muster armies and vie for global control. Set on a world map divided into ten continental regions and 93 provinces, players initially command scattered territories, gradually consolidating power through troop deployment, strategic production, and regional dominance to gain powerful economic advantages. Gameplay is driven by a structured turn system, where each player submits ten orders per turn, choosing from production, movement/combat, and intelligence-gathering operations. Armies include various division types—Infantry, Mechanized Infantry, Armor, Mountain, and Alpine—with fortifications boosting province defense. Movement is dynamic, allowing for invasions, adjacent maneuvers, and airlifts, while espionage helps players anticipate threats. Diplomacy is vital and conducted through 3x5 message cards relayed by the moderator. With global conflict prone to ripple effects, constant intelligence and negotiation become as essential as firepower. Startup materials include a 17-page rulebook, detailed maps, data sheets, and a free turn, while progress is tracked through routine newsletters, production updates, and battle alert postcards.

== Reception ==
Stewart Wieck reviewed Scramble in White Wolf #10 (1988), rating it a 6 out of 10 and stated that "Scramble has a lot to offer for its price. Its best advantages are its minimum turn around time of only eight days, and its reasonable [...] turn price. The action is furious and inexpensive. Wargamers and Risk fanatics should definitely give it a try."
