= Crime Lords (play-by-mail game) =

Play-by-mail game

Crime Lords is a play-by-mail game that was published by Gamers Unlimited beginning in 1981.

== Gameplay ==
Crime Lords was a game in which players are crime lords who control parts of the city Var on the planet Taccii, which collapsed into anarchy after the fall of the interstellar empire.

== Reception ==
W.G. Armintrout reviewed Crime Lords in The Space Gamer No. 51. Armintrout commented that "I have to recommend Crime Lords. I enjoyed it a great deal in spite of all the problems. The game is exciting, the gamemasters are good, and it has the feel of a role-playing game more than anything else. I just hope they rewrite the rulebook soon."
