= You Rule! =

Play-by-mail game

- Publishers: Lucky Llama Games (US), The Madhouse (UK)
- Years active: 1994 to unknown
- Genres: play-by-mail, fantasy
- Languages: English
- Playing time: unlimited
- Materials required: Instructions, order sheets, turn results, paper, pencil
- Media type: Play-by-mail or email

You Rule! is a fantasy roleplaying, play-by-mail wargame published by Lucky Llama Games.

== Development ==
You Rule! was published in the United States by Lucky Llama Games in the United States and by Madhouse UK in the United Kingdom. The first game began in 1994.

== Gameplay ==
You Rule! is a wargame in which a fantasy game allows players to explore and conquer its nearly 100 provinces. Gameplay was on a hex map. Combat was a central element of gameplay. While combat happened with armies, fantasy character races were featured, including dwarves, elves, humans, ogres, orcs, and trolls which could have trades such as "spies, generals and wizards ... doctors, metalsmiths, stonemasons, lumberjacks, accountants and farmers".

== Reception ==
Bob McLain reviewed You Rule! in White Wolf Inphobia #57 (July, 1995) and stated that "Give You Rule! a try [...] It's the best play-by-mail game on the market (for now)."

== Bibliography ==
- Chenevert, Phil (May–June 1995). "You Rule!". Paper Mayhem. No. 72. pp. 18–22, 24.
- Lang, Jamie (Summer 1995). "You Rule!: Part 1, Game Summary". PBMZine. No. 1. pp. 11–14, 24.
- Lang, Jamie (Winter 1995–1996). "You Rule!". PBMZine. No. 1. pp. 42–45.
- McLain, Bob; Palmer, Nicky (September–October 1995). "You Rule!: The Second Revolutionary War; King Nicky vs. Alamo Bob". Flagship. No. 57 (US ed.). pp. 15–18.
- McLain, Bob; Palmer, Nicky (November–December 1995). "You Rule!: The Second Revolutionary War; King Nicky vs. Alamo Bob Chapter 2: The Sepulcher Campaign". Flagship (magazine). No. 58 (US ed.). pp. 19–21.
- McLain, Bob; Palmer, Nicky (January–February 1996). "You Rule!: The Second Revolutionary War; King Nicky vs. Alamo Bob Chapter 3: Finale!". Flagship (magazine). No. 59 (US ed.). pp. 16–20.
- McLain, Bob; Palmer, Nicky (March–April 1996). "You Rule! Post Mortem". Flagship (magazine). No. 60. p. 14.
- Moscatello, Rick (November–December 1994). "You Rule! - More Wargame than Fantasy". Flagship (magazine). No. 52 (US ed.). pp. 13–14.
- Moscatello, Rick (January–February 1995). "The Reviewer Strikes Back!". Flagship (magazine). No. 53 (US ed.). pp. 31–32.
- "PBM Game Ratings: As of 11/18/94". Paper Mayhem. No. 70. January–February 1995. pp. 44–45.
- Webber, David (May–June 1994). "Where We're Headed". Paper Mayhem. No. 66. p. 2.
