= Talwaithe =

Play-by-mail game

Talwaithe is a 1981 play-by-mail fantasy role-playing game moderated by Eric M. Bram.

== Gameplay ==
Talwaithe was a fantasy role-playing game in which the ship Talwaithe crash-landed on a planet where the fruit is deadly to some but gives superhuman abilities to others, and the survivors encounter creatures such as goblins and dwarves.

== Reception ==
W.G. Armintrout reviewed Talwaithe in The Space Gamer No. 60. Armintrout commented that "Talwaithe may be small, but is high-quality and fully professional. I give it a hearty recommendation."
