= Further Into Fantasy =

Further Into Fantasy is a play-by-mail game published by The Laboratory.

== Gameplay ==
Further Into Fantasy is a game in which a single-character fantasy play-by-mail game with light science fiction elements, offers players a choice between three classes—Warrior, Priest, or Sage—each with distinct strengths shaped by how players allocate their starting points. The game comes with a rulebook and the accompanying newsletter, "What's Stirring", which provides tips and ideas, as well as detailed maps, "wanted" posters, and sinister enemies like a cult of snake worshippers.

== Publication history ==
A promotional offer was extended to Adventurer readers for discounted entry and three free first turns in Further Into Fantasy.

== Reception ==
Wayne Bootleg reviewed Further Into Fantasy for Adventurer magazine and stated that "There are no boring descriptions of the weather you encounter on your travels. Up tempo, action packed stuff is what you'll find here! This, combined with loads of maps, 'wanted' posters and really evil monsters adds up to a great game."
