= Xenophobe (play-by-mail game) =

Xenophobe is a play-by-mail game published by Plodd Enterprises.

== Gameplay ==
Xenophobe is a computer-moderated play-by-mail game in which the players control both alien governments and the starships that serve them.

== Reception ==
Stephan Wieck reviewed Xenophobe in White Wolf #10 (1988), rating it an 8 out of 10 and stated that "Xenophobe is suited for players who want to become very active in one game. Not only will active playing greatly increase your enjoyment: it also increase the overall quality of Xenophobe, that's the way the game is designed. Xenophobe is very professional, realistic, and tremendously player interactive."

== Reviews ==
- Paper Mayhem
