= World of Chaos =

World of Chaos is a play-by-mail game published by G.A.D. Games.

== Gameplay ==
World of Chaos is a game in which a single-character, fantasy play-by-mail game allowed players to create a Wizard, Thief, or Warrior by distributing 16 points across combat, magical ability, health, and agility, and then flesh out their character with a personal backstory and beliefs before embarking on adventures.

== Publication history ==
Adventurer magazine ran a promotion offer in 1987 where the first five readers who correctly named King Arthur's most famous knight could receive a free copy of the rulebook.

== Reception ==
Wayne Bootleg reviewed World of Chaos for Adventurer magazine and found the price of turns to be reasonable.

== Reviews ==
- The Games Machine #12
