= Who's Who Among Play-by-Mail Gamers =

Who's Who Among Play-by-Mail Gamers is a book about play-by-mail games published by K&C Enterprises.

== Contents ==
Who's Who Among Play-by-Mail Gamers was published annually beginning in the late 1980s and lists hundreds of play-by-mail gamers, as a comprehensive reference guide for the play-by-mail (PBM) gaming community. It features detailed player profiles that include contact information, occupation, gameplay history, preferred games, and hobbies. To enhance usability, these profiles are cross-referenced by both alias and geographical location, making it easier to connect with other nearby players. Another key section of the book catalogs numerous PBM games, offering specifics such as game costs, number of participants, win conditions, and the style of moderation. This is followed by an alphabetical directory of PBM companies. Altogether, the book serves as both a networking tool and a discovery aid, helping readers explore familiar games more deeply while uncovering new ones.

== Reception ==
Stewart Wieck reviewed The 1990-1991 Who's Who Among Play-by-Mail Gamers in White Wolf #21 (June/July 1990), rating it a 2 out of 5 and stated that "A major fault with the volume is the low quality of production. It's a 160+ perfect bound book, but the interior pages are newsprint paper and therefore smudge very easily. This seems a poor choice if the book is supposed to be reference that can withstand constant consultation.."
