= World Campaigns =

Play-by-mail role-playing game

- Other names: World Campaigns IV, World Campaigns V
- Publishers: World Campaigns, Epping, NH
- Years active: 1980 to unknown
- Genres: Role-playing,
- Languages: English
- Playing time: Fixed
- Materials required: Instructions, order sheets, turn results, paper, pencil
- Media type: Play-by-mail

World Campaigns is a closed-end, hand moderated, play-by-mail game. It was published by World Campaigns of Epping, New Hampshire. Pfodd Enterprises later offered a computer-moderated version of the game. Initially launched in 1980 as World Campaigns IV, the publisher modified the game over time, and changed to World Campaigns V by 1988. The game's purpose was world domination in a post-World War III setting. 35 players per game were assigned countries randomly and fought with World War II equipment and technology. With the loss of the world's superpowers, countries remaining for play ranged from India to Ecuador. The game was reviewed in various gamer magazines of the 1980s receiving mixed to positive reviews.

== History and development ==
World Campaigns is a play-by-mail wargame. It was hand moderated. The game was published by the company World Campaigns which also published Aegyptus. Tim Jones was the gamemaster. Playtesting of World Campaigns IV began in 1977 and the game launched in 1980. The publisher modified the game over time and by 1988 was on a "generic" version.

In the 1980s, Frank Wakefield produced a publication called Campaigners Notes, after which he published The Postal Warrior—a PBM magazine which featured a section dedicated to World Campaigns. In the Summer 1988 issue of The Postal Warrior, Alex Edelstein stated that the publisher changed the game between World Campaigns versions IV and V. One major change was longer game length, which could be less than a dozen turns in the former. In 1989, Pfodd Enterprises was also offering the game in a computer moderated version which initially did not retain all of the detailed game elements of the hand-moderated version.

== Gameplay ==
The game's purpose was world domination. Its setting was post-World War III. 35 players per game were assigned countries randomly and fought with World War II equipment and technology. With the loss of the world's superpowers, countries remaining for play ranged from India to Ecuador.

World Campaigns focused on interplayer conflict versus the aftermath of the nuclear war. More than 200 unit types were av available to players. Investing to obtain advanced technology was an option. Diplomacy is a key element of gameplay

== Reception ==
Bob McLain reviewed the game in the November–December 1983 issue of PBM Universal. He stated that "For battlefield realism ... World Campaigns is light years ahead of most other PBM wargames. WC is slow moving and tedious at times, but playable to a point". Toll Travis reviewed the game in the January–February 1984 issue of Paper Mayhem. He stated that, of all the PBM games in existence to date, I honestly believe that this game is the best value going, the most complex, and best run in the industry. ... some of the best gamers in the country are in at least one version, having been disenchanted with such giants as StarWeb, StarMaster, [Tribes of Crane], Universe II, and the like. I heartily recommend this game to the serious PBMer."

== See also ==
- List of play-by-mail games

== Bibliography ==
- Chase, Brad (Autumn 1984). "The Mighty Pen: We Have an Atlas Too". Flagship. No. 15. p. 31.
- Editors (December 1987 – January 1988). "The Two Faces of World Campaigns". The D2 Report. No. 15. pp. 18–19.
- Fawcett, Bill (May 1981). "World Campaigns". Dragon. No. 49. pp. 85–86.
- McLain, Bob (November–December 1983). "Gamealog: World Campaigns". PBM Universal. No. 1. p. 32.
- Travis, Todd (January–February 1984). "World Campaigns: A Review". Paper Mayhem. No. 4. p. 5.
