= Galaxy: Alpha (game) =

Science fiction play-by-mail game

- Designers: Bruce Lockhart (co-designer)
- Publishers: Intergalactic Games
- Years active: 1984 to unknown
- Genres: science fiction
- Languages: English
- Systems: human-moderated
- Players: unlimited
- Playing time: unlimited
- Materials required: Instructions, order sheets, turn results, paper, pencil
- Media type: Play-by-mail

Galaxy: Alpha is a science fiction play-by-mail PBM game available for play by 1984. Bruce Lockhart of Intergalactic Games co-designed the game as an improvement on the PBM game Starmaster by Schubel & Son. A human-moderated, open-ended game of medium to high complexity, the game had a massive gameplay setting. Players focused on expansion by conquest with combat as a central feature. The game received various reviews in gaming magazines of the 1980s, receiving low marks for its poorly written rulebook with high marks for gamemaster support and generally for the game overall.

== History and development ==
The game was published by Intergalactic Games of Salt Lake City, Utah. Co-designer Bruce Lockhart intended it as an improvement on the Schubel & Son game Starmaster. The publisher allowed Starmaster players to begin Galaxy: Alpha play at the same level.

The game was of high complexity, (Note: Bob McLain rated the game as medium complexity in the Summer–Fall 1984 issue of Gaming Universal.) open-ended and human moderated.

== Gameplay ==
Galaxy: Alpha was a science fiction play-by-mail game. Its setting was massive, with 16 universes, some of which were unexplored. Players began in a galaxy with 30 million star sectors with potential star systems. Each sector was 100 light years in diameter.

It was a game of "galactic expansion and conquest". Reviewer Joe Schell described it as primarily a "long term game of combat" while noting other potential non-combat activities such as research. At the start, players chose one of four races—Builder, Death Globe, Thinker, or Warrior—and advanced through "generations" during gameplay.

Combat was central and most ship types were designed for conflict which included planetary conquest and the search for artifacts.

== Reception ==
Bob McLain reviewed the game in the Summer–Fall 1984 issue of Gaming Universal stating that he would prefer Starmaster based on the rules ease of use, and Galaxy: Alpha for cost. Tony Baldacci reviewed Galaxy: Alpha in the July–August 1986 issue of Paper Mayhem. He noted minor issues such as the rulebook, while stating that he thought it was "THE best space game currently in existence" and highlighting gamemaster support. Joe Schell reviewed the game in the Summer 1987 issue of Flagship. He indicated that the rules may have been the worst he had seen, but stated it was "the best PBM game I've ever played," emphasizing positive gamemaster interaction. He advised that "If you enjoy long-term goals, empire building, and combat, and if you are willing to push yourself through the rules, then Galaxy: Alpha might just be the game for you."

== See also ==
- List of play-by-mail games

== Bibliography ==
- Baldacci, Tony (July–August 1986). "Galaxy: Alpha – A Review". Paper Mayhem. No. 19. pp. 29, 31–32.
- Editors (Autumn 1985). "The Spokesmen Speak: Galaxy: Alpha". Flagship. No. 8 (U.S. ed.). p. 39.
- McLain, Bob (Summer–Fall 1984). "Gamealog: Galaxy: Alpha". Gaming Universal. No. 3–4. p. 58.
- Schell, Joe (Summer 1987). "Exploring Galaxy: Alpha". Flagship. No. 15. pp. 27–29.
