= Horizon's End! =

1980s science fiction play-by-mail wargame

- Designers: Schubel & Son
- Years active: ~1984 to unknown
- Genres: science fiction, wargame
- Languages: English
- Systems: Mixed moderation
- Players: 20
- Playing time: no fixed end
- Materials required: Instructions, order sheets, turn results, paper, pencil
- Media type: Play-by-mail

Horizon's End! is a science fiction play by mail wargame published by Schubel & Son.

== Gameplay ==
Horizon's End! was an open-ended wargame published by Schubel & Son. This science-fiction game was of medium complexity and had mixed moderation—a mix of hand and computers. The game was set on a colony world after widespread conflict destruction." Rather than large-scale war, the game was "a nitty-gritty, grub-in-the-dirt game, where a large proportion of your time is spent rummaging for fuel, food, and ammunition" according to reviewer John Muir.

At the outset, each of the game's twenty players chose the focus of their group: combat or trade. This determined the funding, personnel, weapons, and vehiclesthe group would have.

== Reception ==
In 1987, John Muir praised the game's logistics system while noting that the minor role of non-player characters was a flaw. He described the game as enjoyable with "playing potential and offer[ing] a variety of options".

== See also ==
- List of play-by-mail games

== Bibliography ==
- Editors (May–June 1984). "Gameline News & Updates: Global Supremacy and Horizon's End". Paper Mayhem. No. 6. p. 19.
- McLain, Bob (January–February 1984). "Horizon's End!". Gaming Universal. No. 2. p. 43.
- Muir, John (Spring 1987). "Horizon's End!". Flagship. No. 13 (US ed.). pp. 16–19.
- Schubel & Son (May–June 1984). "PBM Update: Horizon's End!". The Space Gamer. No. 68. pp. 51–52.
