= Gladiators of Death =

Play-by-mail gladiatorial combat game

- Publishers: Fantasy & Futuristic Simulations (US)
- Years active: 1993 to unknown
- Genres: Play-by-mail, gladiatorial combat
- Languages: English
- Systems: computer
- Playing time: fixed
- Materials required: Instructions, order sheets, turn results, paper, pencil

Gladiators of Death is a closed-end, computer-moderated play-by-mail (PBM) gladiatorial combat game published by Fantasy & Futuristic Simulations. In play by 1993, it bore similarities to the PBM games Adventurers Guild, Blood Pit, and DuelMasters Players roleplayed teams of five fighters. Each fighter was designed, trained, and equipped before combat began. The game received positive reviews in various gaming magazines in the 1990s.

== History and development ==
Gladiators of Death was a PBM game of gladiatorial combat published by Fantasy & Futuristic Simulations of Chula Vista, CA. It had similarities with Adventurers Guild, Blood Pit, and DuelMasters. It was a new game in 1993. It was computer moderated.

== Gameplay ==
Players roleplayed a team of five fighters. Initial play involved customizing the characters using available races and traits, as well as training and equipping the gladiators. Races available included Dwarf, Elf, Goblin, Halfling, Human, Lizardman, Orc, and Troll. Players could equip characters with armor and choose from 29 available weapons. Magic was also an element of play. Reviewer Bob Watson noted that the game was for mature players since "The fights get very bloody and if lots of bloodshed turns you off, this game is not for you."

== Reception and legacy ==
Bob Watson reviewed the game in the March–April 1993 issue of Flagship, noting that it was "easy to learn, even for a beginner. He also spoke positively about its value, the publisher, and the gamemaster. Brian Larson reviewed the game in the May–June 1994 issue of Paper Mayhem, calling it a "great game". The game ranked No. 9 of 72 games in the July–August 1994 issue of Paper Mayhem with a rating of 7.441 of 9 points. (Note: The games rating above were, in descending order, Adventurers Guild, Star Fleet Warriors, Victory!, Star Quest, World War IV, Continuum, Galactic Prisoners, and A National Will.)

== See also ==
- List of play-by-mail games

== Bibliography ==
- Editors (July–August 1994). "Gladiators of Death". Paper Mayhem. No. 67. pp. 44–45.
- Larson, Brian (May–June 1994). "Gladiators of Death: Player's Hints for Character Design". Paper Mayhem. No. 66. pp. 8–9.
- Watson, Bob (July 1993). "Gladiators of Death". Flagship. No. 44 (US ed.). p. 43.
- Wright, B.E. (July–August 1994). "Gladiators of Death". Paper Mayhem. No. 67. pp. 41–43, 45.

== Bibliography ==
- Heppner, Vaughn (March–April 1993). "Gladiators of Death". Paper Mayhem. No. 59 (US ed.). pp. 18–20.
- Warner, John; Kelly, Nathaniel M. (November–December 1995). "Gladiators of Death". Paper Mayhem. No. 75. pp. 28–30.
