= Galactic Empires (game) =

Play-by-mail space combat game

- Designers: Original design by Daniel Pierce (1979), David Pierce (1996) and Mark Wardell (2018)
- Publishers: Pierce Enterprises (1979-1996), Wy'East Games (1996-present)
- Publication: September 1979
- Years active: 1979-2002, restarting late 2024.
- Genres: wargame, science fiction, play-by-mail
- Languages: English
- Players: Unlimited
- Setup time: 5 minutes
- Playing time: 20-60 minutes per turn. Potential of hours corresponding with other players planning and negotiating.
- Chance: Medium
- Skills: Negotiation, Strategy game
- Materials required: Instructions, order sheets, turn results, paper, pencil
- Media type: Play-by-mail or email

Galactic Empires is a space-based open-end, play-by-mail (PBM) wargame.

== History and development ==
Galactic Empires was a computer moderated. open-ended, space-based, science fiction play-by-mail wargame of medium complexity published by Pierce Enterprises and later by Wy'East Games. The game launched in 1979 and was "well established" by 1984. By 1986, some of the empires were "massive". Turns had no time limit, enabling overseas players as well. The game designer was Dan Pierce, who attempted to improve on Starweb. By 1985, the publisher had moved the game system from a "TRS 80-1 to a Tandy 1200 HD" for speed and expansion purposes. Dan eventually lost interest in the game, so his brother David took over for many years. In the Mid-90's Mark Wardell, Wy'East Games, took over first under a licensing agreement and later purchasing the game outright.

== Gameplay ==
Gameplay shared similarities with Starweb. Four empires types were available: "Empire Builder, Star Merchant, Xenophobe, [and] Pirate". Players choose between four character types. Available elements include "ships, ground based military equipment, economic components, etc.", providing gameplay options for players.

== Reception ==
Dave Weidner reviewed the game in a 1986 issue of Flagship. He gave it a generally positive review, stating that "In all, Galactic Empires is a game that is simple enough for a novice, while still challenging enough for the most advanced player, at a reasonable cost".

== See also ==
- List of play-by-mail games

== Bibliography ==
- Balicki, Rick (1983). "Game Reviewers Notebook: Galactic Empires". The Nuts & Bolts of PBM. No. 15. p. 20.
- Editors (Summer 1985). "The Spokesmen Speak: Galactic Empires". Flagship. No. 7. p. 29.
- McLain, Bob (January–February 1984). "Gamealog: Galactic Empires". Gaming Universal. No. 2. p. 43.
- Weidner, Dave (Spring 1986). "Galactic Empires: Free-Wheeling Mayhem". Flagship. No. 10. pp. 18, 20.
