= Moneylender (game) =

Play-by-mail role-playing game

- Designers: Rick Barr
- Publishers: Rick Barr
- Years active: ~1981 to unknown
- Genres: Role-playing, medieval fantasy
- Languages: English
- Players: Up to ten
- Playing time: fixed, about 8–12 turns
- Materials required: Instructions, order sheets, turn results, paper, pencil
- Media type: Play-by-mail or email

Moneylender is a closed-end, computer moderated, play-by-mail game set in renaissance Italy. The game was published by Rick Barr around 1981 and averaged about 8–12 turns, sometimes taking less than six months to finish. Up to ten players role-played families with a focus on economics and resources, versus solely combat. The game received generally positive reviews in various gaming magazines in the 1980s.

== History and development ==
Rick Barr created Moneylender. He drew inspiration from Machiavelli's book The Prince. Barr played various PBM games through Flying Buffalo in the late 1970s, but they "lacked a game which [he] felt had a proper historical feel". This drove his development of Moneylender in 1980 using an Apple II computer he had purchased the previous year. Moneylender was a medium-complexity game that was closed-ended and computer moderated.

== Gameplay ==
The game was set during the Italian Renaissance in the 1400s. Players roleplayed as a family head in pursuit of success. Games comprised about six players each. Ten players per game was the maximum. Games averaged 8–12 turns. Reviewer Michael Gray stated that games could last less than six months.

Finance, economics, trade, and intrigue were elements of gameplay. Available actions for intrigue included assassinations, "patronizing the arts", and papal control. The game's purpose was to be the first player to achieve 60,000 victory points. Of the six ways to score a victory point, four involved controlling or wisely spending money (florins), and the other two related to economics and resources, making financial considerations central to game success. Michael Gray called it a game of "finance and negotiation". Players began with resources and a treasury. Thirty independent game cities and twenty mercenaries were available to players at the outset.

== Reception ==
Reviewer Reginald Reid gave the game a positive review in a 1981 issue of Nuts & Bolts of PBM. He stated, "Moneylender is a fast game, relatively inexpensive, [and] the rules have been written with clarity. I personaly [sic] rate the game very highly [within] the new PBM computer moderated games I have sampled in the last year". In a 1983 issue of PBM Universal, Bob McLain said that the game was "Habit forming and exceptionally well thought out ... Very highly recommended". Michael Gray reviewed the game in a 1984 issue of Gaming Universal. He noted possible game improvements including rules revision and turn result formatting, reducing the number of mercenaries, and options for spies. He saw the game as "a fresh change from the usual science fiction and fantasy themes which are so common in PBM games". Gray also reviewed the game in the May 1984 issue of Dragon, stating "I recommend it highly."

== See also ==
- List of play-by-mail games

== Bibliography ==
- Barr, Richard (January–February 1984). "Designing Moneylender". Gaming Universal. No. 2. p. 8.
- Barr, Richard (January–February 1984). "Moneylender [Ad]". Paper Mayhem. No. 4. p. 8.
- Gray, Michael (January–February 1984). "The Moneylender Accounts". Gaming Universal. No. 2. pp. 3–8.
- Gray, Michael (May 1984). "PBM: Problems By Mail". Dragon. No. 85. p. 22.
- McLain, Bob (November–December 1983). "Gamealog: Moneylender". Gaming Universal. No. 1. pp. 30, 34.
- Reid, Reginald (1981). "Moneylender: A Review". Nuts & Bolts of Gaming. Vol. 1, no. 5. pp. 9, 11–12.
- Reid, Reginald B. (January–February 1984). "The Origins of Moneylender: Harking Back to the Renaissance". Gaming Universal. No. 2. pp. 9–10.
- Thompson, Gerry (January–February 1984). "Thompson's Tips". Gaming Universal. No. 2. p. 8. Article providing gameplay suggestions for Moneylender.
