= The Weapon (game) =

Play-by-mail space exploration game

- Designers: Dan Ealy
- Publishers: 4Sight, Fantastic Simulations
- Years active: 1984 to unknown
- Genres: science fiction, play-by-mail
- Languages: English
- Players: 15
- Playing time: set limit
- Materials required: Instructions, order sheets, turn results, paper, pencil
- Media type: Play-by-mail

The Weapon is a closed-ended, science fiction, play-by-mail (PBM) game.

== History and development ==
Dan Ealy designed the game to run on the Apple II. Memory limitations restricted game design. Ealy aimed for game complexity between Starweb and Empyrean Challenge. The game had medium complexity. Mark Brown programmed the game for ten months prior to playtest beginning in September 1982, taking more than six times longer than initially estimated. Playtesting began in August 1983 with 15 players from Indiana, and Ealy offered the game for play in May 1984.

The game was initially published by 4Sight. By 1988 it was published by Fantastic Simulations.

== Gameplay ==
The Weapon was a science fiction PBM game of space conquest. It was closed-ended and computer moderated. The game allowed 15 players. Players customized their homeworlds using variables such as economics and military. Players could create fleets of ships and other devices such as "warp gates" for faster travel across the game's 20×20 hex map. Players scored points by gaining and holding worlds and destroying the ships of opponents.

== Reception ==
Bob McLain, editor of Gaming Universal stated in 1984 that this was "one of the few games I can recommend without hesitation ... as a gamer you'll be treated to a top notch space adventure". He rated it at 4.5 stars out of 5, or "exceptional". Tim Sullivan of The D2 Report stated that the game was "Recommended for those seeking a bloodier victory-potential science fiction wargame". Mark Walton reviewed the game in the Summer–Fall 1984 issue of Gaming Universal, stating, "For a game of modest complexity, it is exceedingly thought-provoking". Flagship editor Nicky Palmer provided a positive review for The Weapon, stating "if you're the wargamer/planner type, you should try The Weapon".

== See also ==
- List of play-by-mail games

== Bibliography ==
- Crooks, Charles (Winter 1984). "The Weapon: Playtest Review". Flagship. No. 5. p. 31.
- Ealy, Dan (Summer–Fall 1984). "Designer's Diary: Assembling The Weapon". Gaming Universal. No. 3–4. pp. 41–42.
- Editors (Summer–Fall 1984). "Gamealog: The Weapon". Gaming Universal. No. 3–4. p. 65.
- McLain, Bob (Summer–Fall 1984). "Scrambled Thoughts". Gaming Universal. No. 3–4. pp. 2–3.
- Sullivan, Tim (February–March 1988). "From the Helm: The Weapon". The D2 Report. No. 16. p. 30.
- Walton, Mark (Summer–Fall 1984). "The Weapon: A Primer Course". Gaming Universal. No. 3–4. pp. 38–40.
