= Infinite Conflict =

Play-by-mail game

- Publishers: Gemini Systems, Inc.
- Genres: play-by-mail
- Languages: English
- Playing time: Fixed
- Materials required: Instructions, order sheets, turn results, paper, pencil
- Media type: Play-by-mail or email

Infinite Conflict is a play-by-mail game that was published by Gemini Systems.

== Gameplay ==
Infinite Conflict is a space-based play-by-mail game that was published by Gemini Systems, Inc. of Miami, FL. It was human-moderated and open-ended with Easy–Medium difficulty.

Players explored the Quadrant to defeat their adversaries. Players role-played one of seven species (e.g., human, insect) and navigated fleets of up to twelve types of ships on a simple map. The basic combat system limited options while fighting.

In 1987, the publisher began an annual award for the Greatest Empire of Infinite Conflict. Criteria included production, amount of colonies, "growth rate, new discoveries, fulfilled quests, and many others".

== Reception and commentary ==
Jim Gould reviewed Infinite Conflict in The Space Gamer No. 76. Gould commented that "If you are tired of long turnaround time and want a good, simple shoot-'em-up space game, Infinite Conflict may well be your cup of tea. If you're more frugal or patient, or if you like knowing everything about a game before playing it, you shouldn't touch it."

A reviewer in a 1984 issue of Gaming Universal rated the game at two of five stars, or "mediocre". He stated that it had "average action and occasional atmosphere", while its theme was similar to many contemporary space-based games. Game minuses included multiple requirements and limitations of species. Gamemaster narration was a plus.

In the September–October 1986 issue of Paper Mayhem, Infinite Conflict tied for 7th through 9th place in its Best PBM Games of 1986 list along with Galaxy: Alpha and Quest of the Great Jewels. Its publisher, Gemini Systems Inc. tied for 7th through 11th place in the Best PBM Company of 1986 list with Adventure Systems, Game Systems Inc, Graaf Simulations, and World Campaigns. Gemini Systems Inc gamemaster Roger Hart also tied for 7th through 11th place in the Best GM of 1986 list.

The July–August 1987 issue of Paper Mayhem included a fiction story about a starfighter pilot from the game's Kysuurian Empire.

== See also ==
- List of play-by-mail games
