= The Final Campaign =

Play-by-mail game

The Final Campaign is a play-by-mail space-based wargame that was published by Blue Panther Enterprises beginning in 1989.

== Publication history ==
The Final Campaign was a closed end, computer moderated play-by-mail game. Blue Panther Enterprises officially released the game on July 1, 1989. The publisher provided players with a rulebook of over eighty pages.

== Gameplay ==
The Final Campaign juxtaposed the large scale of many play-by-mail games by pitting two players against each other. A reviewer in 1991 described the game as "down-and-dirty, planetary warfare between two warring races" where diplomacy was not a factor. Gameplay occurred on a 15 × 15 grid. Each player designed alien armies with associated equipment, weapons, and troops. Players were limited to 30 units and designed their armies with their role or victory condition in mind (e.g., defender). Players assigned rankings for units in the following areas: "attack, defense, mettle, weaponry, status, equipment, experience and leadership". The publisher provided a disk to assist IBM users in the "rather lengthy calculations" associated with army creation. This disk was called the "Army Construction Toolkit".

Once created, players employed their armies in player-vs-player warfare. According to the publisher, "Once in the battle, [players] must contend with firing modes, movement modes, all types of terrain, line-of-sight, morale, weather and an enemy that never stays still."

Players received detailed turn reports which included intelligence on the adversary's army. Players then returned a one-page order sheet to the game moderator providing simple moving and firing instructions without the use of codes. The gaming computer kept track of gameplay on an 11 x 17 hex map.

== Reception ==
Stephan and Stewart Wieck reviewed The Final Campaign in the February–March 1990 issue of White Wolf Magazine. They provided the game low marks for materials and diplomacy and high marks for game moderation and strategy, rating the game overall a four out of a possible five. The reviewers noted that little to no diplomacy was required for the game and the strategy aspect primarily derived from army creation. Chris Arnold reviewed the game in a 1991 issue of Flagship, stating that it was "a fine example of a wargame for the PBM market".

== Bibliography ==
- Arnold, Chris (February 1991). "The Final Campaign". Flagship. No. 30. pp. 8–10.
- Blue Panther Enterprises (July–August 1989). "Gameline". Paper Mayhem. No. 37. pp. 19–20.
- Wieck, Stephan; Wieck, Stewart (February–March 1990). "Review: The Final Campaign". White Wolf Magazine. No. 19. p. 51.
