= Loot the Castle =

Play-by-mail role-playing game

- Other names: LTC
- Publishers: Tom Webster
- Years active: 1981 to unknown
- Genres: role-playing
- Languages: English
- Players: 5 to 9
- Playing time: Fixed
- Materials required: Instructions, order sheets, turn results, paper, pencil
- Media type: Play-by-mail

Loot the Castle (or LTC) is a closed-end, hand moderated, play-by-mail role-playing wargame. It was published by Tom Webster.

== History and development ==
Loot the Castle (LTC) was a hand-moderated PBM game. It was published in 1981 by Tom Webster, who also ran other PBM games such as Empires of the Gonzo Galaxy (EGG).

== Gameplay ==
At two pages in length, its rules were simple. Games comprised 5, 7, or 9 players each. The game was closed-end. Each player role-played the leader of a dwarf or orc army. (Note: Mike Drew stated in a 1983 Nuts & Bolts of PBM review that the armies available were elven and orcish.)

The game map comprised 550 hexagons of varying terrain. It also included structures which could be looted. Combat and intrigue (spying) were elements of gameplay. Players were assigned victory points when "all of the castles, temples, and towers have been looted". Victory points came from the order of final standings as well as a player ranking highest in various areas such as wealth.

== Reviews ==
Mike Drew reviewed the game in a 1983 issue of Nuts & Bolts of PBM. He praised its simple gameplay but found aspects of the rules lacking. In general, he "found Loot the Castle to be an enjoyable game". Bob McLain reviewed the game in a 1983 issue of PBM Universal. He stated that "Although simple, Loot the Castle succeeds in its small way and deserves more publicity and players than it's gotten."

== See also ==
- List of play-by-mail games

== Bibliography ==
- McLain, Bob (November–December 1983). "Gamealog: Loot the Castle". PBM Universal. No. 1. p. 29.
- Drew, Mike (1983). "Galactic Voyage [Ad]". Nuts & Bolts of Gaming. Vol. 3, no. 14. p. 9.
- Editors (October 15, 1981). "New Games". Nuts & Bolts of Gaming. Vol. 2, no. 3. p. 3.
