= Arena Combat =

Play-by-mail gladiatorial combat game

- Publishers: Schubel & Son
- Years active: 1980s to unknown
- Genres: Play-by-mail, gladiatorial combat
- Languages: English
- Playing time: fixed
- Materials required: Instructions, order sheets, turn results, paper, pencil

Arena Combat is a closed-end, computer-moderated play-by-mail (PBM) gladiatorial combat game.

== History and development ==
Arena Combat was a closed-end, computer-moderated PBM game of gladiatorial combat run by Schubel & Son of San Jose, California.

== Gameplay ==
According to the publisher, Arena Combat was set in the world of The Tribes of Crane. Combat was in a "Roman-style" gladiatorial arena. Players customized fighters for personal combat by allocating limited points to character attributes such as strength, and precision. (Note: The ten characteristics were: "strength, endurance, intelligence, will power, coordination, agility, reflexes, precision, balance, and speed".) Players could also select weapons and equipment. Four helmets, nine armors and 23 different weapons were available.

Combat took place over five rounds. Players recorded tactics choices on a computerized orders sheet.

== Reception and legacy ==
W.G. Armintrout reviewed Arena Combat for Fantasy Gamer magazine and stated that "Arena Combat makes a great little beer-and-pretzels game. Try it — I think you'll be surprised by how much fun it is."

Bob McLain reviewed the game in the November–December 1983 issue of Paper Mayhem. He stated that, given its focus, it would be "good for combat buffs, but probably won't hold anyone's attention for long". Richard Derham provided a review in the Summer–Fall 1984 issue of Gaming Universal. He thought it had potential but needed various revisions to reach full potential.

== See also ==
- List of play-by-mail games

== Bibliography ==
- Derham, Richard (Summer–Fall 1984). "Arena Combat". Gaming Universal. No. 3–4. p. 46.
- Kelly, John (March–April 1988). "The Clash of Cold Steel: Arena Combat Reviewed". Paper Mayhem. No. 19. pp. 10–12.
- McLain, Bob (November–December 1983). "Gamealog: Arena Combat". PBM Universal. No. 1. p. 27.
- Muir, John (1983). "Setup Evaluation on Arena Combat". Nuts & Bolts of Gaming. Vol. 3, no. 14. p. 13.
