= Star Trek: The Correspondence Game =

Play-by-mail game

- Publishers: Entertainment Concepts, Inc.
- Years active: 1983 to unknown
- Genres: science fiction; play-by-mail
- Languages: English
- Materials required: Instructions, order sheets, turn results, paper, pencil
- Media type: Play-by-mail

Star Trek: The Correspondence Game is a play-by-mail game that was published by Entertainment Concepts, Inc.

== Gameplay ==
Star Trek: The Correspondence Game was a science-fiction PBM that gave players a chance to be the captain of either the Enterprise or of another Federation heavy cruiser starship.

The game was human moderated; players could write up to three pages of orders per turn, with significant flexibility in gameplay. Players worked with rosters of over 400 crewmembers.

== Reception ==
In the April 1983 edition of Dragon (Issue 72), Michael Gray stated "Just like Silverdawn, this ECI game allows you to write up to three pages of orders each turn for your ship and crew. This game could turn out to be as good as Silverdawn; it will all depend on the time and creativity of the gamemaster."

W.G. Armintrout reviewed Star Trek: The Correspondence Game in Space Gamer No. 66. Armintrout commented that "the gamemastering problems in Star Trek mar an otherwise excellent game. I felt boxed in at times, and at other times wondered if my orders really counted. It was still fun, but less of a real game."

Rich Buck rated the game "superior" in a 1983 issue of The Nuts & Bolts of Gaming, stating his thoughts that it would "become a classic".

A reviewer in the November–December 1983 issue of PBM Universal portrayed the game as a space version of Silverdawn, highlighting its readable rulebook and the crew's "immense detail".

== See also ==
- List of play-by-mail games

== Bibliography ==
- Armintrout, W.G. (Nov–Dec 1983). "Featured Review: Star Trek: The Correspondence Game". Space Gamer. No. 66. Steve Jackson Games. pp. 2–3.
- Buck, Rich (1983). "Star Trek: The Correspondence Game". Nuts & Bolts of Gaming. Vol. 3, no. 16. pp. 12–15.
- Editors (November–December 1983). "Gamealog". PBM Universal. No. 1. p. 31.
- Gray, Michael (April 1983). "The PBM scene: Facts you can use when YOU choose what game to play". Dragon. No. 72. TSR, Inc. p. 32.
