= Stars of the Dark Well =

Play-by-mail science fiction game

- Publishers: Mindgate
- Years active: 1984 to 1993 or later
- Genres: science fiction, space opera
- Languages: English
- Materials required: Instructions, order sheets, turn results, paper, pencil
- Media type: Play-by-mail
- Synonyms: SDW

Stars of the Dark Well is an open-ended, mixed-moderated play-by-mail (PBM) game that was published by Mindgate.

== History and development ==
Stars of the Dark Well was a PBM space opera published by Mindgate. After multiple years of playtesting, the game launched in 1984. By 1988, the game had about 150 players. The game was mixed-moderated—hand-moderated with computer augmentation. Reviewer Terry Weatherby compared the game to Beyond the Stellar Empire.

== Gameplay ==
The game was set in the year 2480 in an area called the "Second Dominium" by a black hole called "The Dark Well". Players could join government groups such as the Frontier Guard or private groups such as Delta Force, Forth wing, Merchant's Guild, and others. Various alien races were also available to roleplay. 37 actions were available, including "Move, Jump, Orbit, Dock, Buy, Sell, and Transfer". In 1988, Mindgate announced an ongoing expansion of the available playing field based on demand and a rules update. After the expansion, there were 400 available star systems and 2,000 planets. (Note: This was an increase from the 23 available systems at initial publication.)

== Reception ==
Terry Weatherby reviewed the game in two 1988 issues of Flagship. He stated that the game "provides, even with its occasional faults and inconsistencies, a good background and simple game system for those seeking to roam the stars at a reasonable, competitive cost. I've enjoyed the game very much and I'm sure others would enjoy it, too". In the July–August 1993 issue of Paper Mayhem, the game was rated 36 of 81 PBM games with a rating of 6.482 of 9 points.

== See also ==
- List of play-by-mail games

== Bibliography ==
- Editors (July–August 1993). "PBM Game Ratings as of 06/06/93". Paper Mayhem. No. 61. pp. 44–45.
- Mindgate (May–June 1987). "Gameline: Mindgate". Paper Mayhem. No. 24. p. 24.
- Mindgate (September–October 1988). "Gameline: Mindgate". Paper Mayhem. No. 32. p. 33.
- Weatherby, Terry (1988). "Stars of the Darkwell". Flagship. No. 18 (U.S. ed.). pp. 29–30.
- Weatherby, Terry (1988). "Stars of the Darkwell [Part II]". Flagship. No. 19 (U.S. ed.). pp. 36–37.
