= Smuggler's Run (play-by-mail game) =

Play-by-mail space opera

- Publishers: Distant Vistas
- Years active: 1990s
- Genres: Role-playing, science fiction, space opera
- Languages: English
- Players: unlimited
- Playing time: unlimited
- Materials required: Instructions, order sheets, turn results, paper, pencil
- Media type: Play-by-mail

Smuggler's Run is a computer-moderated, open-ended play-by-mail game that was published by Distant Vistas in the 1990s. Players role-played an alien character with a customizable spaceship. The goal was to maximize wealth, dueling skill, and reputation as a Pirate.

== History and development ==
Smuggler's Run was a play-by-mail space opera. The game was computer-moderated and open-ended. It was published by Distant Vistas as their first game. According to the publisher, game design took four years. The game was designed for single players. By 1998, game enrollment had dropped to 15–20 players and the publisher was offering the game for free.

== Gameplay ==
Players role-played an alien character with a spaceship. Alien races included "Ten'an, Zephyr, Brogian, Piil, Rhesian, Gecko, [and] Mechbot[s]", each with different skill and attribute levels. Player skills were customizable during setup.

The aim was to maximize wealth, dueling skill, and "become the meanest, most feared pirate in the Galaxy". Non-player characters included the ship's crew, merchants, and others—both respectable and nefarious. Other players could also be encountered.

Starships had various features which could be improved. These included the cargo bay, ship's computer, hull, engine, laser, sensors, and shields.

== Reception ==
Don Ayers reviewed the game in the January–February 1995 issue of Flagship. He provided a positive review, calling it a "fun" game, noting ease of entry for newcomers, quality of game products, and accessible gamemaster.

== See also ==
- List of play-by-mail games

== Bibliography ==
- Ayers, Don (January–February 1995). "Smuggler's Run: Space Operetta!". Flagship. No. 53 (US ed.). pp. 4–5.
- McLain, Bob (August 1996). "Off the Vine: Smuggler's Run". Flagship. No. 60 (U.S. ed.). p. 4.
- Mitchell, Ken (March 1998). "PBM Review: Free Smuggler's Run". The PBM Report. No. 4. p. 7.
- Rodgers, Patrick M. (March–April 1994). "Post Marque: Smuggler's Run". Shadis. No. 12. p. 73.
- Rodgers, Patrick M. (July–August 1995). "Deneb On 50 Qp's A Day - A Smuggler's Run Review". Paper Mayhem. No. 73. pp. 6–9.
