= Empires for Rent =

1990s play-by-mail wargame

- Publishers: Blue Panther Enterprises
- Years active: 1990 to 1992
- Genres: Role-playing, wargame
- Languages: English
- Playing time: Fixed
- Materials required: Instructions, order sheets, turn results, paper, pencil
- Media type: Play-by-mail or email

Empires for Rent is a closed-end, play-by-mail strategic wargame based in space. It was published by Blue Panther Enterprises.

== History and development ==
Empires for Rent was a closed-ended wargame published by Blue Panther Enterprises. It was a strategic space-based game for twelve players. It was based on the publisher's earlier game Destiny. Flagship removed Empires for Rent from their PBM game listing in their January 1993 issue.

== Gameplay ==
Players vied for control of the "Zeta Sector" in a space setting. This involved conquest, expansion, and a wise investment. Combat, economics and diplomacy were key elements of gameplay. Individual victory came from majority ownership of "total Production of the Zeta Cluster for two turns", while an alliance could also score a victory.

== Reception ==
Stewart Wieck reviewed the game in the June–July 1990 issue of White Wolf. He rated it 3 points out of 5 for Moderation, 4 points for Materials, Strategy, and Diplomacy, and 4 points for an overall rating. Marc Macagnone reviewed the game in the January–February 1991 issue of Paper Mayhem. He rated it 4 of 5 points for Complexity, Game Play, and Price, while rating the Rules, Result Sheets, Map Display, and All Around Enjoyment at 5 points. His overall rating was 4.75 stars. Eric Haddock reviewed the game in the January–February 1991 issue of Challenge, stating "I would recommend this game for its strongest attribute: extreme ease of play."

== See also ==
- List of play-by-mail games

== Bibliography ==
- Editors (January 1993). "Galactic View". Flagship. No. 41. p. 53.
- Haddock, Eric W. (January–February 1991). "Reviews: Empires for Rent". Challenge. No. 51. pp. 67, 69.
- Macagnone, Mark (January–February 1991). "Empires for Rent". Paper Mayhem. No. 46. pp. 11–12.
- Wieck, Stewart (June–July 1990). "Play-by-Mail Game Reviews: Empires for Rent". White Wolf. No. 21. pp. 22–23.
