= Starglobe =

Play-by-mail space combat game

- Other names: StarGlobe, Starglobe+, Starglobe PLus
- Publishers: Time Patterns (UK), Superior Simulations (US)
- Years active: 1983 to 2000
- Genres: role-playing, science fiction, space opera, play-by-mail
- Languages: English
- Players: unlimited
- Playing time: unlimited
- Materials required: Instructions, order sheets, turn results, paper, pencil
- Media type: Play-by-mail or email

Starglobe (also StarGlobe, Starglobe+, or Starglobe Plus) is a space-based play-by-mail (PBM) role-playing game. It was open-ended and both computer and human moderated. Time Patterns began publishing the game in the United Kingdom in 1983. U.S. licensees included Superior Simulations and Dragonbyte. Time Patterns stopped publishing in 2000. The game's setting was a cluster of 2,000 stars. Gameplay began at the player's homeworld called Monde. Expansion to other worlds and systems was central, led by the ambitious, morally questionable, Monde-based "Company". Players had a variety of roles they can play as starship captains. Lacking a rulebook or list of orders, players had significant leeway in gameplay and could obtain further game information through text modules obtained during gameplay. The game adhered closely to the theory of relativity, limiting the speed of travel and other aspects of gameplay.

== History and development ==
Starglobe was a space-based play-by-mail game. The game was open-ended and mixed moderated. It was similar to Universe II. Starglobe was designed and run in the United Kingdom by Time Patterns, owned by Ken and Carol Mulholland, the editors of Flagship. It began running in 1983. Superior Simulations ran the game in the United States under license. After it went out of business, Dragonbyte offered the game for play in the U.S.

By 1989, the editors of Flagship stated that Starglobe, "one of PBM's oldest games", was newly updated to include Active Aliens, which were non-player characters operating on the periphery of the star cluster. In the February 1989 issue of GM, the editors reported that the third game had finished and its remaining players were becoming Active Aliens in Starglobe 7. By 1995, Time Patterns was running the game as Starglobe+. In the November–December 2000 issue of Flagship, the Editors announced that Time Patterns had stopped running the game.

== Gameplay ==
The game's setting is a cluster of 2,000 stars. Gameplay begins at the player's homeworld called Monde. Expansion to other worlds and systems is central, led by the ambitious, morally-questionable Monde-based "Company". Players can role-play for the company or separately as Bounty Hunters, Empire Builders, Explorers, Merchants, Pirates, and Xenobiologists. As starship captains, players can increase skills in "navigation, computer adjustment, colony control, weaponry, communications and crew management" by accomplishing tasks.

The publisher did not provide a rulebook or list of orders. Players could make non-standard orders which equated to "special requests" in the manner of The Tribes of Crane and Universe II. Significant leeway was available in play ranging from "blowing up stars, to terraforming planets, to conducting psychic research". Various text modules could be acquired through gameplay which provided more information on the game.

The game adhered closely to the theory of relativity related to travel, time dilation, communications, and span of understanding in the star cluster. Gameplay progressed slowly as travel speed limited player interaction. There were no due dates for orders, but travel was limited to five light years per week in real time. (The star cluster was 100 light years in diameter.) Players could earn "game points" during play, with free turns for a point leader in a role. Diplomacy occurred outside of the game between players.

== Reception ==
John Rees provided an overall positive review in the August 1984 issue of Flagship stating that gamemaster interaction was good and "For overall realism, the game is very near or at the top of the list." Mark Coulshed reviewed the game in the summer 1986 issue of Flagship, suggesting it was not for everyone, including power players or those lacking patience, but stating that, "For the imaginative, independent-minded player, above all for the player who wants to enjoy his game, Starglobe is well worth a try."

== See also ==
- List of play-by-mail games

== Bibliography ==
- Beattie, Trevor (Summer 1986). "Starglobe – A Captain's View". Flagship. No. 11 (U.S. ed.). pp. 23–24.
- Coulshed, Mark (Summer 1986). "Einstein meets Ford Prefect". Flagship. No. 11 (U.S. ed.). pp. 21–24.
- Darkseid (Summer 1987). "Darkseid Explores Starglobe". Flagship. No. 15 (U.S. ed.). pp. 51–52.
- Davis, Henry S. (July–August 1993). "Starglobe: Why You Should Play". Paper Mayhem. No. 61. pp. 32–33.
- Dragonbyte (1989). "Dragonbyte [Ad]". Flagship. No. 23 (U.S. ed.). p. 13.
- Editors (1989). "Starglobe". Flagship. No. 23 (U.S. ed.). pp. 16–17.
- Editors (February 1989). "GM News: More Time Patterns". GM. Vol. 1, no. 6. p. 7.
- Editors (November–December 2000). "The Spokesmen Speak: Science Fiction Games". Flagship. No. 88. p. 8.
- Huyton, Alan (Autumn 1995). "Starglobe+". PBMZine. No. 2. pp. 42–43.
- Kavanagh, Brendon (Winter 1986). "Starglobe". Flagship. No. 13 (U.S. ed.). pp. 36–37.
- Rees, John (August 1984). "The Captains of Monde". Flagship. No. 4. pp. 8–11.
- Smith, Richard L. (November–December 1989). "Starglobe: An Unusual Universe". Paper Mayhem. No. 39. pp. 20–21.
- Time Patterns (1989). "Time Patterns: Starglobe [Ad]". Flagship. No. 25 (U.S. ed.). p. 29.
