= Continuum (play-by-mail game) =

Science fiction play-by-mail game

- Publishers: Zephyr Enterprises (US), MBT Games (US)
- Years active: ~1993 to unknown
- Genres: science fiction, space opera
- Languages: English
- Players: 20
- Playing time: Fixed
- Materials required: Instructions, order sheets, turn results, paper, pencil
- Media type: Play-by-mail

Continuum is a closed-end, science fiction play-by-mail game of expansion and conquest published by Zephyr Enterprises and MBT Games. A game of space exploration and conquest, up to 20 players per game started with a star system and attempted to eliminate all other players. An alternate ending was possible by agreement with remaining players. Exploration, economics, diplomacy, technology advancement, and combat were game elements. Players could develop fleets up to 25 starships. The game received generally positive reviews in various gaming magazines in the 1990s.

== History and development ==
Continuum was a science fiction play-by-mail game, of expansion and conquest published by Zephyr Enterprises. It was a game of medium to high complexity. Games were closed-ended, with each drawing to a conclusion. By 1998, it was being published by MBT Games of North Highland, CA.

== Gameplay ==
There were up to 20 players per game—each beginning with a star system. The game's purpose was to eliminate the other players. An alliance of remaining players could also call the game to an end. Exploration, economics, diplomacy, and combat were all game elements. Gameplay took place on a hex map with 1600 hexes and 160 stars. Players could invest to increase technology levels for weapons, ship propulsion, and other ship components. Over time, players could develop fleets of up to 25 ships.

== Reception ==
Joey Browning reviewed Continuum in the January–February 1994 issue of Flagship. He called it a fun game and praised the gamemaster while cautioning against some tedium involved with filling out the turns. He stated that "If you're looking for a moderately deep game with simple rules and an emphasis on naval combat, this is a good one to try." Mark Macagnone reviewed the game in the September–October 1995 issue of Paper Mayhem. He rated the game 4 stars of 5 for Fun Index, 4.5 stars for the gamemaster response and the Rulebook, and 5 stars for Turn Sheets and Turn Results, with an overall rating of 4.75 stars. Stacey Faust reviewed the game in the March–April 1998 issue of Paper Mayhem, also calling the game fun. She rated the game 4.5 of 5 stars for Fun and Moderation, and 5 stars for Challenge/Frustration, Playability, and Value. She recommended the game for both novices and experts.

== See also ==
- List of play-by-mail games

== Bibliography ==
- Browning, Joey (January–February 1994). "Continuum". Flagship. No. 47. pp. 10–11.
- Macagnone, Mark (September–October 1995). "A Review of Continuum". Paper Mayhem. No. 74. pp. 26, 28–29.
- Smith, T.H. (November–December 1993). "A Review of Continuum". Paper Mayhem. No. 63. pp. 10–12.
- Maust, Stacey (March–April 1998). "A Look at Continuum (and What Not to Do)". Paper Mayhem. No. 89. pp. 4–7.
