= Warp Force Empires =

Science fiction play-by-mail game

- Publishers: Emprise Game Systems (until October 1981), Steve Gray
- Years active: ~1980 to post 1989
- Genres: Space fantasy
- Languages: English
- Systems: Computer-moderated
- Players: 16
- Playing time: Fixed
- Materials required: Instructions, order sheets, turn results, paper, pencil
- Media type: Play-by-mail

Warp Force Empires is a play-by-mail game that was published by Emprise Game Systems. The game was previously called Warp Force One, but renamed in 1984 by its publisher.

== History and development ==
The game was mentioned as early as 1980 in a review by David Bolduc in the November 1980 issue of The Space Gamer. Its original name was Warp Force One. The editors of Nuts & Bolts of PBM announced in 1982 that Steve Gray purchased Emprise Game Systems, which had stopped publishing the game in October 1981. Gray planned upgrades to the game and was considering a name change.

In 1984, the publisher changed its name to Warp Force Empires while revising the player communication system.

== Gameplay ==
Warp Force One was a play-by-mail space exploration game where 16 players vied for control of 50–60 star systems, each containing from 2 to 4 planets. Warp Force Empires was computer-moderated. According to White Wolf Magazine editor in chief Stewart Wieck in 1988, Warp Force Empires players "control an interstellar empire" with the goal of having the most victory points by game's end. Empires could have various makeups, with two types of variables (1) motivational: utopian, despot, xenophobe, and searcher, and (2) environment: A, B, C, and D. Players negotiated galaxies of 30–98 star systems with a space fleet comprising warships and transports—if warp engines were available. Games lasted 17–35 turns.

Diplomacy was handed by use of a coding language called CorGaSyl developed by the game designer, Steve Gray, to allow anonymous diplomacy during gameplay. Gray playtested CorGaSyl on Warp Force Empires. According to Stewart Wieck,

All diplomacy in WFE [was] handled through the game via CORrespondence GArners SYmbolic Language (or CORGASYL).

Wieck advises that this was a positive as it does not allow expert gamers or "fraternities" or sororities" to take advantage of novices.

== Reception ==
David Bolduc reviewed Warp Force One in the November 1980 issue of The Space Gamer, and commented that "Warp Force One is an enjoyable game, both for the first-time player, because of its straightforward rules and mechanics, and for the more sophisticated PBMer who wants a challenge."

Sam Moorer reviewed Warp Force Empires in Space Gamer/Fantasy Gamer No. 83. Moorer commented that "Emprise Game Systems makes a great, and apparently successful, effort to exclude all phone numbers, addresses, or other identifying characteristics from the messages. This keeps you from suddenly facing a prearranged team of opponents, the bane of many PBM games. it is this unique quality of diplomacy which I feel suits the PBM gamer."

In 1988, White Wolf Magazine editor in chief Stewart Wieck recommended Warp Force Empires as "a fine PBM game", adding that it was his "favorite".

Jim Townsend reviewed Warp Force Empires in White Wolf #13 (December 1988) and stated that "WFE features one of the highest quality rulebooks available in PBM. Also, the innovative and revolutionary CorGaSyL communications system (CORrespdondence GAmers SYmbolic Language) is used in all games of WFE. CorGaSyL eliminates real world influences on the game by keeping all participants anonymous until game's end."

== See also ==
- List of play-by-mail games

== Bibliography ==
- Bolduc, David (November 1980). "Featured Review: Four PBM Space Games". The Space Gamer. No. 33. Steve Jackson Games. pp. 14–15.
- Editors (1982). "New Games". Nuts & Bolts of Gaming. Vol. 3, no. 11. p. 4.
- Gray, Steve (May–June 1984). "PBM Update: Emprise Game Systems". The Space Gamer. No. 69. p. 34.
- Gray, Steve (July–August 1988). "The Coming of CorGaSyl". Paper Mayhem. No. 31. pp. 30–32. A coding language invented to allow anonymity in diplomacy in play-by-mail games—playtested for Warp Force Empires.
- Moorer, Sam (October–November 1988). "Space Gamer Reviews". Space Gamer/Fantasy Gamer. No. 83. World Wide Wargames. p. 27.
- "PBM Review: Warp Force Empires". The Space Gamer. No. 83. Oct–Nov 1988. p. 27.
- Wieck, Stewart (1988). "Review: Warp Force Empires". White Wolf Magazine. No. 12. p. 23.
