= Star Empires (play-by-mail game) =

Play-by-mail space combat game

- Other names: Star Empires II, Star Empires III
- Designers: Geoff Squibb
- Publishers: Geoff Squibb, Spellbinder Games (licensee)
- Years active: 1984 to 2002 or later
- Genres: role-playing, science fiction, space opera, play-by-mail
- Languages: English
- Systems: hand moderated, computer moderated
- Players: 30–40
- Playing time: years
- Materials required: Instructions, order sheets, turn results, paper, pencil
- Media type: Play-by-mail or email

Star Empires is a space-based play-by-mail (PBM) space opera. Designed and published by Geoff Squibb in 1984 in the United Kingdom, the game was hand-moderated for the first year, later transitioning to computer moderation. Spellbinder Games in the UK later ran the game under license. Later versions included Star Empires II and Star Empires III. Players began with a colony and minimal resources and technology, expanding through exploration within a galaxy of 44,688 sectors. The game received generally positive reviews in Flagship in the 1980s and 1990s. Star Empires III was still active as of 2002.

== History and development ==
Star Empires was a play-by-mail space opera. Designed by Geoff Squibb, the game was open-ended. Its first galaxy opened for gameplay in 1984. A second galaxy opened in August 1985. The game was initially published by Geoff Squibb who hand moderated the game (early turn results were hand-written). By 1985, turn results were generated by computer.

By 1996, an updated version, Star Empires II, was being developed and run by both Squibb and Spellbinder Games, the latter under license. Both were based in the United Kingdom. In 1998, Squibb announced his intent to launch Star Empires III. This version was still active as of 2002.

== Gameplay ==
Players led a colony with minimal resources and technology. The two-dimensional game map of the galaxy comprised 44,688 sectors. Galaxies included 30–40 player characters and various non-player elements. Exploration was central to successful early play. Early strategies included a focus on military power versus a focus on technology development.

== Reception ==
Wilfrid Nixon reviewed the game in the Autumn 1985 issue of Flagship stating, "If you'd like to try a game that doesn't need a degree in mathematics or accounting. yet poses some very subtle problems, and if like me you are a Sci-Fi nut, then you could do worse than give it a try." Simon Bracegirdle reviewed the game in a 1996 issue of Flagship, saying that it was "an excellent game" and that he was "hooked". He stated, "If you relish a challenge and are prepared to invest time and effort in a game of some depth then Star Empires is probably exactly what you are after." Space Empires II placed first in the Space Opera Category in Flagship's July–August 1998 PBM game ratings. (Note: Starglobe and Beyond the Stellar Empire placed second and third.)

== See also ==
- List of play-by-mail games

== Bibliography ==
- Bracegirdle, Simon (July–August 1996). "Star Empires II". Flagship. No. 62. pp. 14–16.
- Editors (January–February 1996). "The Spokesmen Speak: Firms". Flagship. No. 59. p. 8.
- Editors (July–August 1998). "The Spokesmen Speak: Firms". Flagship. No. 74. p. 12.
- Nixon, Wilfrid (Autumn 1985). "Star Empires: High-tech Galactic Expansion". Flagship. No. 8. pp. 30–31.
- Lomas, Tim (July–August 1998). "Your Ratings: World Games, Space Operas, Miscellaneous". Flagship. No. 74. p. 42.
- Rees, Alex (July–August 1998). "Star Empires II: A Beginner's Guide". Flagship. No. 74. p. 39.
- Vacos, Bryan (June–July 2002). "Discovering Sci-Fi Games, Open Ended Games: Star Empires (Geoff Squibb)". Flagship. No. 97. pp. 10–11.
