= Aegyptus (game) =

Historical roleplaying play-by-mail game

- Publishers: World Campaigns
- Years active: 1984 to unknown
- Genres: play-by-mail
- Languages: English
- Players: Up to 150 per game
- Playing time: Unlimited
- Materials required: Instructions, order sheets, turn results, paper, pencil
- Media type: Play-by-mail or email

Aegyptus is a computer moderated play-by-mail (PBM) game. Announced in 1984, it was published by World Campaigns

== History and development ==
Aegyptus was a role-playing play-by-mail game published by World Campaigns. It was computer moderated, and open-ended. It was a strategic-tactical, historical game of medium to hard complexity.

The game was announced in the May–June 1984 issue of Paper Mayhem.

== Gameplay ==
The game setting was an imaginary country on historical Earth, akin to the Greek city-states. Players roleplayed through the copper, bronze and iron ages. Up to 150 players could play in a game. As part of gameplay, "Players begin as the leader of a herding tribe. You progress to a farming tribe, to a city, state, and then an empire." Play possibilities and turn fees increased as players rose in stature, with $15 turn fees for players leading empires which could comprise thousands of people. Combat, economics, and technology were elements of gameplay.

== Reception ==
Editor Bob McLain reviewed the game in a 1984 issue of Gaming Universal. He recommended the game, stating that it was "A truly impressive game of developing civilization." Overall, McLain rated it four stars of five, or "exceptional".

== See also ==
- List of play-by-mail games

== Bibliography ==
- Editors (May–June 1984). "GameLine News & Updates: World Campaigns". Paper Mayhem. No. 6. p. 18.
- Flagship editors (Autumn 1984). "The Spokesmen Speak". Flagship. No. 4. p. 37.
- Gooch, Larry T. (September–October 1985). "Aegyptus: A Game Review". Paper Mayhem. No. 14. pp. 7–13.
- McLain, Bob (Summer–Fall 1984). "Gamealog: Aegyptus". Gaming Universal. No. 3–4. p. 56.
- World Campaigns (July–August 1984). "A is for Aegyptus". Paper Mayhem. No. 7. p. 20.
