= Blood Pit =

Play-by-mail gladiatorial game

- Other names: Enter the Blood Pit, Blood Pit Arena
- Publishers: Emprise Game Systems (US), Unicorn Games (UK)
- Years active: 1989 to unknown
- Genres: gladiatorial arena combat
- Languages: English
- Playing time: Fixed
- Materials required: Instructions, order sheets, turn results, paper, pencil
- Media type: Play-by-mail or email

Blood Pit (or Blood Pit Arena) is a closed-end, computer-moderated, play-by-mail gladiatorial arena dueling game. Originally called Enter the Blood Pit, Emprise Game Systems purchased the game in the late 1980s and revised it, later transitioning it to play-by-email (PBeM). In 1993, White Wolf Publishing purchased the game.

During gameplay, players chose and prepared fighters for combat in four arenas. The game received generally positive reviews in various gamer magazines in the early 1990s, with Michael C. Powell emphasizing the game's complexity.

== History and development ==
In the late 1980s, a game emerged on the market called Enter the Blood Pit. After about a year, Emprise Game Systems purchased and revised the game.

In 1990, the game was known as Blood Sport Arena. In the same year, Emprise "relaunched" Blood Pit. Jim Townsend was the Emprise owner and manager. Also in 1990, the publisher was testing updates such as introducing magic users—"Sorcerers, Priests, and Illusionists". At this time, the game had 300 active positions. (Note: At the same time, Reality Simulation Inc.'s Duelmasters, a Blood Pit competitor launched years earlier, had 2,000 positions.) By 1990, there were four arenas: "Playtest, Massacre [Square] Gardens, Maelstrom and the Flagship Demo". The game later transitioned to play-by-email (PBEM).

By 1991, Unicorn Games ran the game in the United Kingdom. In 1993, White Wolf Publishing purchased the game from Emprise Game Systems and began playtesting a new version.

== Gameplay ==
Example Turn Report Excerpt

MINUTE 11
The ref throws a lump of granite at DR. RUTH and it hits with a thunderclap!!
DR. RUTH regrets not eating an energizing breakfast
Minutes seem like hours in the Pit...
The referee gruffly says 'Hold your clay, make dummy pay!'
DR. RUTH attempts to strike THE DUCHESS
THE DUCHESS's dodge attempt is slowed by encumberance!!
DR. RUTH strikes at THE DUCHESS's lower back with her ball & chain

A mere scratch is caused by the blow!

THE DUCHESS hesitates
DR. RUTH is wasting stamina rapidly

— Nikky Palmer, Flagship magazine, June 1991.

Blood Pit is a game of gladiatorial combat. It occurs in an "anonymous historical era". Players chose and prepared fighters from six race choices. These included male or female humans, elves, half-elves, dwarves, half-orcs, and halflings. Each player led a group of five fighters and assigned them a team name. Characters had 71 points (random and assigned) across six characteristics: constitution, dexterity, intelligence, size, presence, and strength.

Players had various equipping options for their characters. This included access to various types of handheld and thrown weapons such as axes (e.g., battle axes, great axes, and hatchets), daggers (e.g., knives, picks, and stilettos), clubs (e.g., maces and war hammers), flails and morning stars, staffs, spears (e.g., boar spears, javelins, long spears, and tridents), swords (e.g., broadswords, bastard swords, epees, and short swords), and even rocks as a last resort. Some of the 28 total weapons available were nonstandard such as nets, scythes, and swordbreakers. Fighting weaponless was also possible. Protection included various armors (e.g., cloth, cuir bouilli, and brigantine), helmets, and shields (e.g., bucklers and tower shields). Before the first fight, characters were trained and assigned tactics. (Note: Blood Pit offered nine armors and six helmet types.) Skills included "dodge, parry, throw, charge, lunge, disarm, initiative, feint, brawl, and sweep". Other variables include "activity level, aiming points, [and] defense points". Reviewer Michael C. Powell called the game "extremely complex".

Players chose combat options (variable throughout fights) and received detailed turn reports with color commentary. (Note: 15 fighting styles were available.) Success depended somewhat on properly matching tactics to the players equipment.

== Reception ==
Michael C. Powell reviewed the game in a 1990 issue of American Gamer. He emphasized the game's excitement as well as its high complexity level which he couched as a positive and negative. Powell stated that the game was so complex that "even the game's programmer has a losing record in the playtest arena".

Chris Milliken reviewed the game in an August 1990 issue of Flagship, stating that it was not for those opposed to graphic detail and combat, but that it was "a fast-paced, well organized and well-run game." In 1991, he stated that he "thoroughly enjoy[ed]" the game.

Stewart Wieck reviewed the game in a 1993 issue of White Wolf. He rated it a 4 out of a possible 5 points, stating it as the best of the genre he had played. (Note: Wieck was discussing PBM gladiatorial combat games.)

== See also ==
- List of play-by-mail games

== Bibliography ==
- Editors (October 1990). "The Spokesmen Speak". Flagship. No. 28 (US ed.). pp. 44–46.
- Hughes, Dave; Powell, Michael; Wicklund, Kurt (October 1990). "Blood Pit Journal, Part 1". Flagship. No. 28 (US ed.). pp. 41–42.
- Hughes, Dave; Powell, Michael; Wicklund, Kurt (December 1990). "Blood Pit Journal (Part 2)". Flagship. No. 29 (US ed.). pp. 5–7.
- Milliken, Chris (August 1990). "Building a Blood Pit Team". Flagship. No. 27 (US ed.). p. 5.
- Milliken, Chris (April 1991). "Blood Pit Notes from the Winner". Flagship. No. 31 (US ed.). p. 12.
- Milliken, Chris (April 1991). "The Blood Pit Awaits". Flagship. No. 26 (US ed.). pp. 13–14.
- Powell, Michael C. (July–August 1990). "Life (And Death) In The Pit – Blood Pit". American Gamer. No. 1. pp. 43–44.
- Powell, Michael C. (January–February 1991). "Interview With The Bloodmaster – Blood Pit". American Gamer. No. 2. pp. 35–39. Interview with Jim Townsend, owner of Emprise Game Systems.
- Townsend, Jim (August 1990). "View from the Top". Flagship. No. 27 (US ed.). pp. 5–6.
- Townsend, Jim (November 1991). "Sorry for the Delay". Flagship. No. 34 (US ed.). p. 43.
- Wieck, Stewart (July–August 1993). "Featured Review: BloodPit". White Wolf. No. 37. pp. 66–68.
