= The Assassin's Quest =

Space-based play-by-mail game

- Publishers: De Jager & Co. (CAN) Emprise Game Systems (US)
- Years active: ~1981 to unknown
- Genres: science fiction, wargame
- Languages: English
- Playing time: Fixed
- Materials required: Instructions, order sheets, turn results, paper, pencil
- Media type: Play-by-mail or email

The Assassin's Quest is a play-by-mail game that was published by De Jager & Co.

== History and development ==
The game was published by De Jager & Co. of Canada. By 1983, due to challenges with the game, Emprise Games acquired the publication rights.

== Gameplay ==
The Assassin's Quest was a ship combat game with 30 players set in a 3D universe, in which each player has a target player to hunt and an assassin player to be hunted by. The purpose was to destroy identified enemy ships using a player's starting fleet and assigned allies. Alliances were set up in "Triads" of three players each, which included a player's three target triads, three "assassin" triads (gunning for the player), and three neutral triads. Game elements to be managed were movement, sensors, weapons (comprising Lasers, Impulsars, and Depolarizers), mines, shields, energy, and other factors.

== Reception ==
David Bolduc reviewed The Assassin's Quest in The Space Gamer No. 33. Bolduc commented that "The Assassin's Quest is both difficult and unusual, but well worth the money for a player who's looking for a thrill."

== See also ==
- List of play-by-mail games

== Bibliography ==
- Bolduc, David (November 1980). "Featured Review: Four PBM Space Games". The Space Gamer. No. 33. Steve Jackson Games. pp. 14–15.
- Editors (January 1983). "Nits & Bytes". Nuts & Bolts of Gaming. Vol. 3, no. 13. p. 8.
- Levin, R. (1981). "TAQ; The Assassin's Quest: A Review". Nuts & Bolts of Gaming. Vol. 1, no. 6. pp. 8, 10.
- Orzoff, Nathan (June 1981). "The Most Dangerous Game: The Assassin's Quest". Nuts & Bolts of Gaming. Vol. 2, no. 1. p. 11.
