= Lords of Valetia =

Play-by-mail role-playing game

Lords of Valetia is a 1977 fantasy, role-playing play-by-mail (PBM) game published by RB&B Design Operations, Inc.

== History ==
In a 1984 issue of Gaming Universal, Steve Jackson said that Lords of Valetia was "the most spectacular PBM fiasco in history" related to the issue of short-lived PBM companies of the period. Rick Loomis echoed this idea, noting that this was "the most notorious of the disappearing companies". According to Loomis, the first moderator "was running the whole thing in between college classes". He stated that the game reportedly had more than 1,000 paid players at the outset. After some delays, game ownership changed and the game ran briefly before additional delays and another ownership change. Financial challenges then caused the game's collapse.

== Gameplay ==
Lords of Valetia was a fantasy role-playing PBM game run by subscription. The hand-moderated game was based on Dungeons & Dragons.

== Reception ==
Brian Esterson reviewed Lords of Valetia in The Space Gamer No. 15. Esterson commented that "In all, the game shows thought and imagination. [...] Very little information, aside from the rules, is given to you at first. You learn about the land and the creatures in it as you explore."

== See also ==
- List of play-by-mail games
