= Aegyptus (disambiguation) =

Aegyptus is a mythological king of Egypt.

Aegyptus may also refer to:

- Aegyptus (mythology), other characters in Greek mythology
- Aegyptus (province) or Egypt, a Roman province
- Aegyptus (game), a 1984 play-by-mail game

== See also ==
- Egyptus, a figure in Latter-day Saint theology
- Aegypius
- Egypt
