= Wofan =

Play-by-mail game

Wofan is a play-by-mail game that was designed and moderated by Larry Hall, and published by The Gamemaster in 1980.

== Gameplay ==
Wofan was a human-moderated play-by-mail game in which each player controls a nomadic tribe of the two warring races on a medieval world.

== Reception ==
David Bolduc reviewed Wofan in The Space Gamer No. 40. Bolduc commented that "As a whole, I like Wofan and enjoy playing it, but it still seems somewhat disorganized, and does not presently offer the complexity of play possible in The Tribes of Crane. Hopefully Larry Hall can get the problems sorted out over the next few months. Until then, Wofan is still potentially a very good game."
