= Starweb =

Play-by-mail space exploration game

- Designers: Rick Loomis
- Publishers: Flying Buffalo Inc., Rick Loomis PBM Games
- Years active: 1975–present
- Genres: Science fiction, play-by-mail
- Languages: English
- Players: 15
- Playing time: Months
- Materials required: Instructions, order sheets, turn results, paper, pencil
- Media type: Play-by-mail or email
- Website: http://rickloomispbm.com/

Starweb (or StarWeb) is a closed-end, space-based, play-by-mail (PBM) game. First published by Flying Buffalo Inc. in 1975, it was the company's second PBM game after Nuclear Destruction, the game that started the PBM industry in 1970. Players today can choose a postal mail or email format. Fifteen players per game assume one of six available roles and explore and conquer planets within a universe comprising 255 worlds. The object of the game is to attain a predetermined number of points which are generated by various actions during gameplay. Multiple game variants are available. Starweb is still available for play as of 2021 through the company Rick Loomis PBM Games.

Starweb has received numerous reviews from the 1970s to the 21st century with positive and negative comments. Reviewer and game designer Timothy B. Brown stated in 1990 that "StarWeb is arguably the best-loved, most widely known play-by-mail game in history," and the editor of Flagship magazine said in 2009 that it was "one of the best turn-based games ever". The game has won awards across multiple decades from the 1980s to the 21st century. These include the 1984 Charles S. Roberts Award for Best Play-by-Mail Game, the 1997 Origins Award for Best Ongoing Play-by-Mail Game, the 2000 and 2003 Origins Awards for Best Play-by-Mail Game, and the 2006 Origins Award for Play By Mail Game of the Year.

== Play-by-mail genre ==
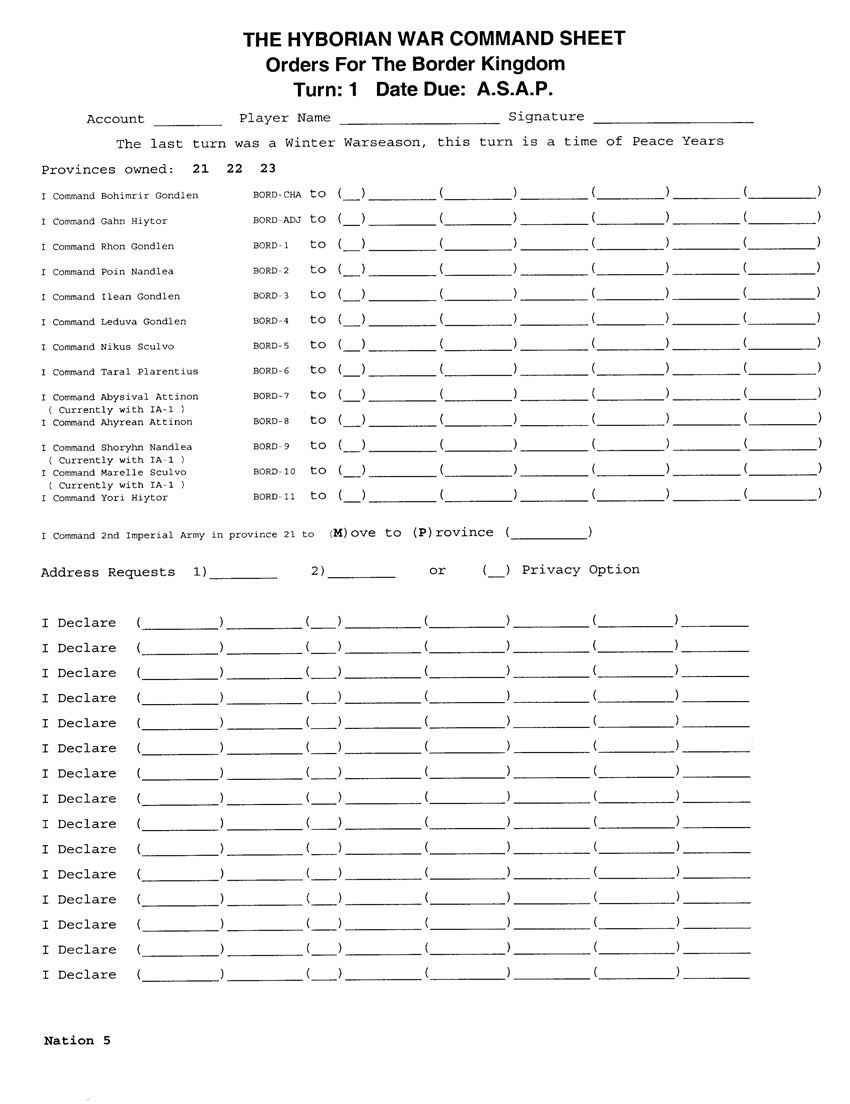
Example turn 1 order sheet for the Border Kingdom

Play-by-mail (PBM) games feature a number of differences from tabletop games. The typical PBM game involves many more players than an average tabletop game can support. (Note: For example, the PBM game It's a Crime can accommodate 110 players per game.) PBM game lengths are usually longer, depending on a number of factors. Turnaround time is how long a player has to prepare and submit "orders" (moves and changes to make in the game) and the company has to process them and send back turn results. The average turnaround time in the 1980s was two weeks, but some modern PBM games are play-by-email (PBEM) with shorter turnaround times of twice per week or faster. (Note: For example, the PBM game Covert Operations allows twice-per-week moves, daily moves, and private games where players can specify turn around times.) Open ended games allow players to strengthen their positions without end, with players continually entering and leaving the game. Examples include Heroic Fantasy and Monster Island. Conversely, closed end games typically have all players starting on equal terms, with rapid, intense, player vs. player gameplay that ends when a player or group achieves some victory condition or is unopposed. Examples include Hyborian War and It's a Crime. The complexity of PBM games can range from the relatively simple to the PBM game Empyrean Challenge, once described as "the most complex game system on Earth". (Note: Vern Holford, owner of Superior Simulations, developed Empyrean Challenge, a PBM game that reviewer Jim Townsend described in 1988 as "the most complex game system on Earth" with some turn results for large positions at 1,000 pages in length. According to Townsend, in those cases there was a significant investment in time to understand what happened on a turn as well as to fill out future turn orders. He said a player without a spreadsheet was "nearly doomed from the outset".)

Once a player has chosen a game and receives an initial game setup, gameplay begins. This generally involves players filling out order sheets for a game (see example image) and sending them to the gaming company. The company processes the turns and returns the results to the player, who completes a subsequent order sheet. Diplomacy is also frequently an important—sometimes indispensable—part of gameplay. The initial choice of a PBM game requires consideration as there is a wide array of possible roles to play, from pirates to space characters to "previously unknown creatures". Close identification with a role typically increases a player's game satisfaction. (Note: This section is taken from the Play-by-mail genre section of the Hyborian War Wikipedia article.)

=== History ===
Some games have long been played by mail between two players, such as chess and Go. PBM play of Diplomacy—a multiplayer game—began in 1963. The emergence of the professional PBM industry occurred less than a decade later. Rick Loomis, "generally recognized as the founder of the PBM industry", accomplished this by launching Flying Buffalo Inc. and his first PBM game, Nuclear Destruction, in 1970. Professional game moderation started in 1971 at Flying Buffalo. (Note: Flying Buffalo later added games such as Battleplan and Heroic Fantasy along with Starweb and others. By the late 1980s these games were all computer moderated.) For approximately five years, Flying Buffalo was the single dominant company in the US PBM industry until Schubel & Son entered the field in about 1976 with the human-moderated Tribes of Crane. It was within this environment that Starweb entered the PBM field.

== Publication history ==
In the mid-1970s, Flying Buffalo discovered significant demand for a space-based PBM game through survey. Consequently, Rick Loomis invented Starweb which Flying Buffalo released as its second PBM game. The game launched in 1975. By 1979, the company had about 360 active Starweb games. Starweb was Flying Buffalo's most popular game in 1984. (Note: The next most popular games were Heroic Fantasy in a "distant second", Battle Plan, and Starlord, respectively.) The original game instructions were in a "mimeographed" manual which eventually required a second edition to address player confusion. The instructions went through multiple additional revisions over the following decade. By 1992, the company had run more than 1,100 games of Starweb.

Starweb has been featured in various gaming magazines. The Nuts & Bolts of Starweb was the first PBM magazine not published by a PBM company. Although it morphed over time, its publisher, Rick Buda, started it as a fanzine for Starweb in June 1980, especially to discuss how to play his favorite character, the Berserker. Starweb has also been reviewed in gaming magazines such as Challenge, The Space Gamer, and White Dwarf as well as PBM magazines such as Flagship and Paper Mayhem. In 1980, the game enjoyed substantial growth from advertising in science fiction magazines.

Starweb is still available for play. After the August 4, 2021 sale of Flying Buffalo Inc. to Webbed Sphere, the PBM games—which were not included in the sale—continued under a new company: Rick Loomis PBM Games. The company, run by Loomis' sisters and their PBM computer expert, continues to offer Starweb by postal mail and play-by-email (PBEM) as of August 2021 to include several variants. (Note: As of the company's August 2021 newsletter, variants offered are "Multi game", "Anonymous multi game", and "Bitter end anonymous multi game".)

== Gameplay ==
According to reviewer Jay Reese, Starweb "is a science fiction game of stars and star fleets". Each game has fifteen players, each with one homeworld. (Note: The game was limited to fifteen players because Flying Buffalo's computer only had 16 kilobytes of RAM.) These players compete for the 255 available worlds. Six different identities are available for play: Apostle, Artifact Collector, Berserker, (Note: Starweb uses the term "Berserker" with implicit permission of Fred Saberhagen; Saberhagen returned the favor by using a fictionalized Starweb game as a backdrop for his novel Octagon (1981).) Empire Builder, Merchant, and Pirate. Each character type obtains points for different actions. For example, Apostles earn five points per world controlled and one point per ten existing converts, among other methods, to gain points in a given turn. Artifacts provide points as well—the game has ninety standard and various special artifacts available during gameplay. Holding a standard artifact provides a player five points per turn while a special artifact can provide a larger number of points, such as the Treasure of Polaris at 20 points per turn. (Note: Artifacts can also cause a player to lose points such as the Radioactive Isotope, which causes a player to lose 30 points per turn.) Diplomacy and player interaction is a critical aspect of gameplay, and Timothy B. Brown emphasizes that "Starweb is a game of diplomacy."

The editors of Flagship magazine provided the following as a summary of gameplay in 1983:

You are the ruler of a single planet of beings just beginning to explore a web of 255 planets linked by complex and unmapped paths. You can build ships to explore and conquer; each of your ships and planets will get a report on enemy forces at or moving past the planet, as well as a list of the neighboring worlds, thereby enabling you gradually to build up a map of the Web.

Loomis stated that in 1979 the Merchant character was winning the most, and was, at the time, "the easiest position to play, generally, and the hardest to stop, once he gets started" while an Empire Builder or Apostle would likely require a longer game to score a victory. As of 1980, player's moves were written in a precise, but complex coded format. However, according to reviewer Paul S. Person, game mechanics were simple—even simplistic for some—with a universe limited in size and "easily written" orders.

The game ends when a player reaches an unrevealed point total determined at the beginning of the game. Although this total is normally between 1,000 and 10,000 points, "[s]trategy changes radically in longer games". Graham Bucknell described a version of Starweb called "25,000 Starweb" in the Winter 1983 issue of Flagship where the game ended when a player achieved 25,000 points. In a March 1983 issue of The Space Gamer, A.D. Young stated that the average game ended on turn 22 with an average of 7,500 points. (Note: Young stated that the standard deviation for the score required to win was "about 1600" points.) In 1980, turns took three to four weeks, allowing fifteen to twenty turns annually, causing some games to take longer than a year, as full games take about eighteen turns, according to reviewer Timothy Brown. In late 2008, the publisher stated that approximately 10,000 points was the game's goal.

=== Variations ===
Rick Loomis stated in 2014 that a "Multi" game of Starweb allows each of its five players to roleplay three different identities as one position. According to the game publisher, this is more costly, more challenging, and for advanced players. Another variation is anonymous play, which prevents player interaction. "Bitter End Starweb" is played without points, ending when "one player owns more than half of the worlds on the map". Games of this version have lasted longer than four years. A longer variant, played with points, is "Extra-long Starweb", where 50,000 versus 25,000 points won. Other variations include combinations of variables, such as "Slow Multi Anonymous Starweb". In 1980, the company offered a computer version, where custom programs could play each other (human assistance not allowed).

In the late 1970s, Flying Buffalo had additional Starweb variations. These included "Blitz Starweb" with 9-day versus 14-day order turnarounds, "Slow Starweb" with 3-week turnarounds (automatic for foreign players), "Anonymous Starweb" which prohibited diplomacy, "Bribery Starweb" which allowed players to purchase extra game items, and "California Starweb" which comprised players from the state of California. Flying Buffalo offered similar versions for New York, Chicago, and Florida. "War Against Robots" pitted empire builders and Berserkers against each other in equal numbers. Reviewer Glenn T. Wilson described a pending variant called "15-Character Solitaire" in 1985, as one-player race to 10,000 points for each of 15 characters. In 1986, Flying Buffalo attempted an All-Female version based on recommendations. In 1997, there was a "Time Travel" variant offered where players could redo their previous turn once during the game.

== Reception ==
Starweb received various reviews in the 1970s and 1980s after publication. Jay Reese reviewed the game in an April 1977 issue of The Space Gamer and concluded that, "If you can get past the early errors and discouragement, you will find that Starweb can be a fascinating game." Chris Harvey reviewed the game for White Dwarf in its June–July 1980 issue, stating that, "if you like what you've read, then save up your pennies, cross those empty evenings off your diary and jump into the new hobby of CM PBM." Also in July 1980, Paul S. Person provided a review in The Space Gamer, commenting that "Starweb is a smoothly-run game ... which emphasizes diplomacy at the expense of detail. It is recommended for those who like galactic empire themes and who would like a game with lots of hidden intelligence." In the April 1983 edition of Dragon, Michael Gray stated, "This is Flying Buffalo's science fiction play-by-mail game of conquest, trade, exploration and diplomacy. And it's nothing short of a masterpiece!" In a 1987 issue of White Wolf, reviewer Stewart Wieck stated that "Starweb is a superior PBM game," ranking it a 9 out of a possible 10.

Stewart Wieck reviewed Starweb in White Wolf #10 (1988), rating it a 9 out of 10 and stated that "Starweb is a superior PBM game. Though among the first of PBM games, Starweb has continued to remain popular, a true testimony to its excellence, and it has won numerous awards."

Reviewers continued commenting on Starweb in the 1990s. In a 1990 issue of Challenge magazine, Timothy B. Brown stated that, with over 1,000 games run, "StarWeb is arguably the best-loved, most widely known play-by-mail game in history", and—while noting that aspects of the point system could be a drawback—recommended it as an enjoyable game. (Note: Brown also pointed to the game's longevity itself as evidence of its quality.) In 1999, Pyramid magazine named Starweb as one of the Millennium's Best Games. Editor Scott Haring said "Starweb is the king of [PBM games] – the industry's most popular and longest running. ... Beautifully balanced, with a design so well-polished it gleams." In a 2009 issue of Flagship magazine, its editor Carol Mulholland called Starweb "one of the best turn-based games ever".

Starweb has been recognized and won various awards over multiple decades. These include the first PBM game listed in Games magazine's "Games 100" in 1981, "Best Science Fiction PBM Game" by the PBM Association in 1985, and best game in the Game Manufacturer's Association (GAMA) PBM category in 1985. Starweb also won the 1984 Charles S. Roberts Award for Best Play-by-Mail Game, the 1997 Origins Award for Best Ongoing Play-by-Mail Game, the 2000 and 2003 Origins Awards for Best Play-by-Mail Game, and the 2007 Origins Award for Play By Mail Game of the Year.

== Reviews ==
- 1981 Games 100 in Games
- 1982 Games 100 in Games

== See also ==
- Galactic Empires. Designed with similarities to Starweb.
- List of play-by-mail games

== Bibliography ==
- "A List of the Games We Run". Flying Buffalo Quarterly. No. 38. Flying Buffalo, Inc. February 1979. p. 16.
- Appelcline, Shannon (2011). Designers & Dragons. Mongoose Publishing. ISBN 978-1-907702-58-7.
- Babcock, Chris (December 2013). "Diplomacy" (PDF). Suspense and Decision. No. 2. p. 16. Archived from the original (PDF) on July 4, 2021.
- Brown, Timothy B. (February–March 1990). "StarWeb". Challenge. No. 42. p. 76.
- Buckell, Graham (Winter 1983). "Superweb". Flagship. No. 1. p. 11.
- Buda, Rick (August 2014 – September 2015). "The Nuts & Bolts of Gaming: Recollections of a Mad Publisher" (PDF). www.suspenseanddecision.com. p. 38.
- Crompton, Steve (August 2021). "The Big News...". Rick Loomis PBM Newsletter. No. 1. p. 1.
- Dohm-Sanchez, Jeffrey (August 4, 2021). "Webbed Sphere, Inc. Acquires Flying Buffalo, Inc". ICv2.
- Dreslough, Dee (28 April 2013). "Star Web". Games of Fame. Word Press. Article stated as reviewed by Rick Loomis of Flying Buffalo prior to posting.
- DuBois, Steven (January–February 1997). "Monster Island: A Review". Paper Mayhem. No. 82. p. 4.
- "Gameline – News and Items: Flying Buffalo Inc". Paper Mayhem. No. 16. January–February 1986. p. 20.
- Flying Buffalo, Inc. "Covert Operations". Flying Buffalo Inc.
- Gray, Michael (April 1983). "The PBM Scene: Facts You Can Use When YOU Choose What Game to Play". Dragon. No. 72. TSR, Inc. pp. 32, 34.
- Greenberg, Andrew (May–June 1993). "PBM Corner: A Beginning in Play-By-Mail; Is it Worth It?". White Wolf Magazine. No. 36. pp. 8–9.
- Haring, Scott D. (1999-12-24). "Second Sight: The Millennium's Best "Other" Game and The Millennium's Most Influential Person". Pyramid (Online). Steve Jackson Games.
- Harvey, Chris (June–July 1980). "Starweb ... The Final Frontier?". White Dwarf. No. 19. Games Workshop. p. 26.
- Harvey, Chris (April–May 2003). "My Life in Games" (PDF). Flagship.
- KJC Games. "It's a Crime (Rule Page)". KJC Games.
- Lindahl, Greg. "PBM / PBEM List Index: closed-ended". Play by Email (PBeM) & Play by Mail (PBM) List Index.
- Loomis, Rick (March 1978). "Editorial". The Flying Buffalo's Favorite Magazine. No. 36. Flying Buffalo, Inc. p. 7.
- Loomis, Rick (February 1979). "Editorial". Flying Buffalo Quarterly. No. 38. Flying Buffalo, Inc. pp. 1–3.
- Loomis, Rick (September 1980). "Editorial". Flying Buffalo Quarterly. No. 41. Flying Buffalo, Inc. pp. 1–3.
- Loomis, Rick (February 1984). "Editorial". Flying Buffalo Quarterly. No. 49. Flying Buffalo, Inc. p. 2.
- Loomis, Rick (October 1984). "Survey Results from FBQ#49". Flying Buffalo Quarterly. No. 50. Flying Buffalo, Inc. p. 4.
- Loomis, Rick (1985). "Rick Loomis on Play-By-Mail: Magazines". Space Gamer: The Magazine of Adventure Gaming. Vol. July/August 1985, no. 75. p. 36.
- Loomis, Rick (November–December 1987). "Gameline: Flying Buffalo Inc". Paper Mayhem. No. 27. p. 26.
- Loomis, Rick (March 1992). "Tailpiece: Rick Loomis Calls for ... A Chancce for Golden Oldies". Flagship. No. 36. U.S. Edition. p. 51.
- Loomis, Rick (December 2013). "Letter from Rick Loomis to the Play By Mail/Email/Web/Turn Based Games Community" (PDF). www.suspenseanddecision.com. p. 38.
- Loomis, Rick (March 2014). "PBM Activity Corner News, Developments, & Bragging Rights From Game Companies and Game Moderators: Flying Buffalo, Inc" (PDF). www.suspenseanddecision.com. p. 35.
- Loomis, Rick. "History of Flying Buffalo Inc". www.flyingbuffalo.com. Archived from the original on 2008-10-22.
- Loomis, Rick (February 1986). "Whats Up". Flying Buffalo Quarterly. No. 53. Flying Buffalo, Inc. pp. 1–3, 10.
- Loomis, Rick (June 1998). "Editorial". Flying Buffalo Quarterly. No. 77. Flying Buffalo, Inc. p. 1.
- Loth III, John Kevin (March–April 1986). "A PBM Primer". Paper Mayhem. No. 17. p. 42.
- McLain, Bob (August 1, 1993). "Play By Mail: The Infancy of Cyberspace". Pyramid. sjgames.com.
- Mouchet, Paul (February 2017). "PBM: Reducing the "Barrier to Entry"" (PDF). Suspense and Decision. No. 15. PlayByMail.net. pp. 10–12. Archived from the original (PDF) on October 30, 2020.
- Mulholland, Carol (2009). "Editorial Comment: Games to be Proud of...". Flagship. No. 130. p. 4.
- "Origins Award Winners (1984)". Academy of Adventure Gaming Arts & Design. Archived from the original on April 15, 2008.
- "Origins Award Winners (1997)". Academy of Adventure Gaming Arts & Design. Archived from the original on January 30, 2008.
- "Origins Award Winners (2000)". Academy of Adventure Gaming Arts & Design. Archived from the original on 2008-04-15.
- "Origins Award Winners (2003)". Academy of Adventure Gaming Arts & Design. Archived from the original on April 30, 2008.
- "Origins Award Winners (2007)". Academy of Adventure Gaming Arts & Design. Archived from the original on August 28, 2007.
- Paper Mayhem editors (January–February 1993). "Front Matter". Paper Mayhem. No. 58. p. 1.
- Person, Paul S. (July 1980). "Capsule Reviews". The Space Gamer. No. 29. Steve Jackson Games. p. 30.
- "Rick Loomis on Play-By-Mail [Editor Intro]". The Space Gamer. No. #75. July–August 1985. p. 35.
- Reese, Jay (April 1977). "Reviews". The Space Gamer. No. 11. Metagaming. pp. 35–36.
- Rodin, Larry; Townsend, Jim (May–June 1987). "The Impact of the "Everyone" Revolution on SW-975". Paper Mayhem. No. 24. pp. 39–48.
- "Starweb – Rules Summary". Flagship. No. 1. Winter 1983. p. 11.
- "Starweb Rules". Flying Buffalo Inc. Archived from the original on June 14, 2008.
- "Starweb". Wayback Machine. Flying Buffalo Inc. Archived from the original on December 5, 2008.
- "The Flying Buffalo Press Release: Webbed Sphere, Inc. acquires long time game publisher Flying Buffalo, Inc". Flying Buffalo Inc.
- Townsend, Jim (January–February 1987). "How to Win in PBM—An Organizational Viewpoint". Paper Mayhem. No. 22. p. 29.
- Townsend, Jim (1988). "The PBM Corner". White Wolf Magazine. No. 11. p. 20.
- "What PBM Games are We Running?". Rick Loomis PBM Newsletter. No. 1. August 2021. p. 2.
- Young, A.D. (March 1983). "Berserker: The Web's Creampuff: Or, How to Beat the Bersks". The Space Gamer. pp. 12–14.
- Webster, Tom (Mar–Apr 1997). "Multi-Starweb Game 178: Some Basic Procedures Everyone Should Follow". Paper Mayhem. No. 83. p. 23.
- Wilson, Glenn T. (July 1985). "The 15-Character Solitaire Starweb Game". Flying Buffalo Quarterly. No. 52. Flying Buffalo, Inc. p. 4.
