= Galactic Prisoners =

Play-by-mail space combat game

- Publishers: Grandel, Inc.
- Years active: 1986 to unknown
- Genres: wargame, science fiction, play-by-mail
- Languages: English
- Playing time: unlimited
- Materials required: Instructions, order sheets, turn results, paper, pencil
- Media type: Play-by-mail or email

Galactic Prisoners (or GP or G.P.) is a closed-end, play-by-mail (PBM) wargame.

== History and development ==
Galactic Prisoners was a space-based, science fiction play-by-mail game published by Grandel, Inc. It was open-ended and computer moderated. The gamemaster was Ed Grandel.

== Gameplay ==
Players begin on an alien planet with a "mammoth all terrain vehicle (ATV)". The timeframe is the year 2240 CE. After encountering a hostile alien race called the Nibor ("Robin" reversed), the few remaining humans fight for survival as planetary prisoners crewing their ATVs. Combat and exploration are elements of gameplay.

== Reception ==
Terry Cannon reviewed the game in a 1991 issue of Paper Mayhem, stating that it was "unique, realistic, and exciting".

== See also ==
- List of play-by-mail games

== Bibliography ==
- Cannon, Terry (January–February 1991). "The Universe & Galactic Prisoners". Paper Mayhem. No. 46. pp. 15–17.
- Fay, Mike (November–December 1987). "Escapades of Galactic Prisoners". Paper Mayhem. No. 27. pp. 8, 10.
- Fay, Mike (July–August 1989). "Exploring Galactic Prisoners". Paper Mayhem. No. 37. pp. 6–10.
- Lunsford, M.T. (June–July 1987). "Galactic Prisoners: Wrong Side of the Bars". D2 Report: The Play-by-Mail Gamer's Reading Companion. Vol. 2, no. 4. pp. 10–11.
- Schell, Joe (March–April 1986). "A Review of Galactic Prisoners". Paper Mayhem. No. 17. pp. 7–8.
