= Universe II =

Space-based play-by-mail game

- Designers: Jon Clemens
- Publishers: Jon Clemens
- Years active: 1979s to unknown
- Genres: Play-by-mail, space opera
- Languages: English
- Systems: computer-moderated
- Players: 30–40
- Playing time: unlimited
- Materials required: Instructions, order sheets, turn results, paper, pencil

Universe II is a computer-moderated, science fiction, play-by-mail game designed by Jon Clemens and published by Clemens and Associates, Inc. in 1979.

== Development ==
According to David Webber, the editor of Paper Mayhem Magazine in 1985,

Universe II was started near the end of 1979 by Jon Clemens. He had the idea that it would be a fun hobby for himself and that he could get 30–40 people to play, and they would all have fun. Within a few months, the game grew to the point where it was interfering with his regular business. Then a Space Gamer Readers Survey for 1980 rated Universe II as the best PBM game. As a result, new players poured in and very quickly Jon had more people than he could handle.

== Gameplay ==
Universe II was an open ended, computer-moderated, science fiction, PBM game. Players begin the game with a single starship exploring an unknown universe, and the game begins with a small set of rules until players discover new rules.

== Reception ==
David Bolduc reviewed Universe II in The Space Gamer No. 33. Bolduc commented that "Universe II is my favorite of the PBM games I've played to date. The beginning player is able to learn the game as he goes along, and the more experienced player will be intrigued by the complexity of play that is possible, as well as by the amount of room for cooperation and diplomacy between players. Best of all, Universe II doesn't grow old on you, as many games do. There's always a new singularity to be explored or a lost empire to be encountered."

In the April 1983 edition of Dragon (Issue 72), Michael Gray stated "I found the game to be quite dull and dropped out soon after that. I do remember that the company was very efficient about returning my results quickly."

== See also ==
- List of play-by-mail games
