= Sulzberg (Lower Bavaria) =

Mountain in Germany

Coordinates: 48°50′36″N 13°41′58″E

- Location within Germany Location within Bavaria

Highest point
- Elevation: 1,013 m (3,323 ft)

Geography
- Location: Bavaria, Germany

Sulzberg (German pronunciation: [ˈzʊltsbɛʁk]) is a mountain of Bavaria, Germany.

== IMS station ==
Two of the German IMS (International Monitoring System) measuring stations for monitoring a nuclear test ban treaty are located on Sulzberg. The primary seismic station GERES (PS19) consists of 25 seismometers installed in a radius of two kilometers. The five measuring points of the 26DE (IS26) detect infrasound. The favorable geological conditions led to the local construction of the measuring points.
