= The Nuts & Bolts of PBM =

American play-by-mail magazine

Nuts & Bolts of PBM
- Cover of a 1983 issue with cover art by Larry Brenza. The magazine logo (crossed sword and raygun) appears in multiple instances on the cover.
- Editor: Richard Buda
- Assistant editor: Al Liszka
- Page Games/Interviews: Nate Orzoff
- Art: Larry Brenza
- Magazine layout: Rhonda Brenza
- Sales: Rich Balicki
- Categories: Play-by-mail game magazine
- Frequency: Bi-monthly
- Publisher: Rick Buda, Bolt Publications
- First issue: 1980
- Final issue: 1985
- Country: United States (Chicago, IL)
- Language: English

The Nuts & Bolts of PBM (also known as Nuts & Bolts of Starweb, or Nuts & Bolts of Gaming, or NABOG) was a magazine dedicated to play-by-mail games, first as a self-published fanzine in June 1980, and then as a magazine published by Bolt Publications in 1983.

== Development ==
The magazine started in mid-1980 in Chicago as the Nuts & Bolts of Starweb, edited by Rick Buda. The magazine's logo was a sword crossed with a raygun, which was integrated into multiple covers in 1983 as part of a puzzle for readers.

The editors of Flagship magazine called Nuts & Bolts of Gaming "the oldest PBM magazine", and Rick Loomis of Flying Buffalo called it the first PBM magazine not published by a PBM company.

According to editor Rick Buda, the magazine was initially a fanzine for Starweb composed of a "Xeroxed copied sheet folded in half … that made four, crude pages". Buda explained how the publication was named as follows:

I was enamored with The Berserker character [from Starweb], and really [started] the zine to discuss strategies for playing that part to the hilt. That is actually the source of the name, twofold in its reference. One – The robotic image of machinery (Nuts & Bolts), and; Two – Getting down to particulars within the characters (get down to the nuts and bolts of something).

After demand increased, Buda and Loomis increased the size of the publication, changed the publication rate to bi-monthly, and renamed it to the Nuts & Bolts of PBM. In 1983, Buda incorporated it as Bolt Publications after the load became unmanageable, changing the name once again to Nuts & Bolts of Gaming. This was shortened to NABOG, which was also their mascot's nickname. The magazine's print run, which started with a small number, rose to 600–700 in the first year, and peaked eventually at 3,000, including international readers.

In 1984, after 24 issues, Bob McLain from Gaming Universal offered to acquire the publication, and Buda prepared for the transition rather than the next issue. When Gaming Universal, after a run of only three issues, ceased publication before the deal went through, N&B "collapsed"

In 1985, the magazine was nominated for an Origins Award, but had ceased publication before the final voting. The Summer 1985 issue of Flagship noted that the magazine had recently closed, while also noting that Rick Buda had been elected to the Play-By-Mail Association's (PBMA's) Membership Committee with Paper Mayhem's David Webber as well as Jon Clemens, Mike Shefler, and Jack Everitt.

Rick Loomis wrote, "It was a fun magazine, but somewhat ahead of its time, and it had no financial backing."

== Contents ==
The Nuts & Bolts of PBM originally focussed on Starweb, but evolved to cover PBM games, and eventually all game genres. Each issue had several regular features: an editorial by Rick Buda, readers' letters, a home video column, PBM news, a games page, and classified ads. Articles included one about Zork, an interview with Steve Gray of the PBM publisher Emprise Game Systems, and a look at the Star Trek PBM. The magazine also contained artwork and fiction.

== Reception ==
In Issue 48 of The Space Gamer, W.G. Armintrout reviewed the magazine after its first year and wrote, ""This magazine is a disappointment. Nuts & Bolts needs contributors who have something to say and know how to say it. I can't recommend this magazine until it shapes up."

In Issue 30 of Abyss (Summer 1984), Jon Schuller reviewed the magazine in its fourth year, and called it "visually appealing, though the art is of variable quality. They pack a lot of material into each page, and the reduced text is readable." Schuller felt the price ($2.25 per issue) was steep considering how much of a 32-page issue was devoted to advertising. Schuller's main issue with the magazine was "the haphazard presentation and randomness of selection and arrangement of articles. There also seems to be less variety than there could be, and fewer topics and games covered than one might like." Schuller also noted, "N&B shows promise, and has some interesting items, but on looking back over it, there's really less concrete and repeatedly useful material than I would like to see." Schuller concluded, "It is worth checking out, and certainly of interest to PBMers."

== See also ==
- List of play-by-mail games

== Bibliography ==
- Buda, Rick (August 2014). "The Nuts & Bolts of Gaming: Recollections of a Mad Publisher" (PDF). Suspense and Decision. No. 10. playbymail.net. p. 91.
- Cassandra (Summer 1985). "Loomis Beats Critics: Flagship Sweeps to PBMA Victory; Schubel Slate Defeated". Flagship. No. 7. p. 23.
- Drew, Mike (1983). "Zork I: The Great Underground Empire". Nuts & Bolts of Gaming. Vol. 3, no. 16. p. 8.
- Editors (1983). "Parts Department". Nuts & Bolts of Gaming. Vol. 3, no. 17. p. 30.
- Flagship Editors (Spring 1984). "The World Beyond Flagship". Flagship. No. 2.
- Loomis, Rick (1985). "Rick Loomis on Play-By-Mail: Magazines". Space Gamer. No. 75. July–August 1985.
- Orzoff, Nathan (1983). "GamesPage". Nuts & Bolts of Gaming. Vol. 3, no. 17. p. 19.
- Spencer, David (2022). "Small Starts: A Look into a 1980s Play-by-Mail Magazine—the Nuts & Bolts of Gaming". Suspense & Decision.
