= Gaming Universal =

Play-by-mail game magazine

- Cover of August/September 1987 Issue
- Editor-in-Chief: Bob Mclain, John Kelly
- Categories: Play-by-mail
- Frequency: Bi-monthly
- First issue: November 1983
- Final issue: 1988
- Country: United States
- Language: English

Gaming Universal (or PBM Universal) was a magazine dedicated to play-by-mail games. The magazine was published between 1983 and 1988, in two separate print runs with Bob McLain as editor of both editions. Its first print run was published by Imagascape Industries between November 1983 and 1985. The first issue was called PBM Universal, with a name change by the second issue. The second edition ran between 1987 and 1988, published by Aftershock Publishing. The magazine received average to positive reviews from other magazine editors and reviewers.

== Contents ==
Gaming Universal was a professionally published magazine covering the play-by-mail game field. An "epic poem" by L. Sprague de Camp appeared in the second issue, which was panned by readers due to its non-PBM theme.

== Initial publication ==
The magazine was first published in November 1983 by Imagascape Industries. Rick Loomis, of Flying Buffalo, Inc., noted that this was because Bob McLain had identified the lack of a professional independent PBM magazine. McClain said that the PBM magazine at the time with an exclusive hold on the market was The Nuts & Bolts of PBM. Flagship magazine began publication in the United Kingdom the month before Gaming Universal's first issue was published.

The first issue was called PBM Universal. It became Gaming Universal on the second issue. The magazine began with heavy advertising, known writers, and extensive PBM game analysis. According to Loomis, the first three issues were published, albeit all late, before McLain realized that a PBM magazine wouldn't be profitable due to the small gaming base and lack of advertising budgets in PBM companies. In the Spring 1985 issue, Flagship announced that Gaming Universal, their "main rival in the international PBM arena" had collapsed. Flagship's editor, Nicky Palmer, noted that Bob McLain had built a "large subscription and advertising base" and created a quality product, but let it go in favor of a non-gaming multi-million dollar business. In an article called "The Rise and Fall of Gaming Universal" in a 1985 issue of Space Gamer, McLain stated that the PBM industry at the time could not support a high-end PBM publication and the venture ended up losing money. He added that the publication enabled various things, such as the PBM Mass Mailer "which enabled moderators to reach 10,000 prospective customers".

== Second edition ==
By 1987, a new edition of Gaming Universal was in publication by Aftershock Publishing. The new edition continued to run bi-monthly—or six times per year—but on an off-month schedule (Dec/Jan versus Nov/Dec and Jan/Feb) to provide seamless coverage with the other PBM magazines: Paper Mayhem and the UK-based Flagship. By the March/April 1987 issue of Paper Mayhem, the new Gaming Universal had one interim issue and two regular issues averaging 20–32 pages. David Webber, Paper Mayhem's editor in chief, noted that the initial issues were light on content (articles and reviews) because the publisher wanted to ensure publication timeliness, which was a noted issue with the prior version. Webber also observed that some of the authors for the new Gaming Universal also wrote for Paper Mayhem and Flagship. Webber recommended his readers pick up Issue #2 of Gaming Universal, the December/Jan 1986/1987 issue, which was the best to date as it contained a listing called The PBM Primer which was a listing of all known US PBM companies and games.

In 1988, this edition of the magazine also ended. David Webber announced that Gaming Universal was ending publication. He announced that Advent Games Inc "had a few of their partners buyout the others", decide to end publication, and try to sell the magazine. Their unsuccessful efforts officially finished the second publication run of Gaming Universal. Paper Mayhem took over Gaming Universal subscriptions for those not requesting a refund.

== Reception ==
Michael Gray reviewed Gaming Universal in Space Gamer No. 70. Gray commented that "Gaming Universal is indispensable to anyone seriously interested in PBM. Non-PBM gamers may even be motivated to get involved after seeing just what is available and how interesting PBM can be. If you read 'PBM Update' in [Space Gamer], you should subscribe to GU. I recommend it highly."

== See also ==
- List of play-by-mail games

== Bibliography ==
- Gray, Michael (July–August 1984). "Capsule Reviews". Space Gamer. No. 70. Steve Jackson Games. pp. 50–51.
- Loomis, Rick (February 1984). "Editorial". Flying Buffalo Quarterly. No. 49. Flying Buffalo, Inc. p. 2.
- Loomis, Rick (July–August 1985). "Rick Loomis on Play-By-Mail". Space Gamer. No. 75. p. 36.
- McClain, Bob (May–June 1985). "The Rise and Fall of Gaming Universal". Space Gamer. No. 74. pp. 38–39.
- Palmer, Nicky (Autumn 1984). "PBEM". Flagship. No. 4. pp. 23–24.
- Webber, David (March–April 1987). "Flagship". Paper Mayhem. No. 23. p. 36.
- Webber, David (March–April 1988). "Where We're Headed". Paper Mayhem. No. 29. p. 2.
