= Flagship (magazine) =

Play-by-mail magazine

- Cover of Flagship magazine No. 1.
- Editor: Nicky Palmer, Chris Harvey, Carol Mulholland
- Categories: Play-by-mail games; Games
- Frequency: bi-monthly
- Founded: 1983
- Final issue Number: 2010; 130
- Country: United Kingdom
- Based in: Exmouth
- Language: English
- Website: http://www.flagshipmagazine.co.uk
- ISSN: 1743-6788

Flagship was an independent magazine for gamers that was published from 1983 to 2010, originally published bimonthly in the UK for play-by-mail game (PBM) players, and then in the U.S. and in France. In 2002, it expanded its coverage to other types of games.

== History ==
Flagship began publication in the UK in October 1983, becoming the first editorially independent PBM magazine the month before Gaming Universal's first issue was published in the United States. The editor for the initial Winter 1983 issue was Nicky Palmer who produced it in collaboration with Chris Harvey. In 1985, the magazine launched an American edition under the editorship of Bob Bost, which allowed the magazine to emphasise and promote international connections between PBM players. In early 1994 Joey Browning became editor of the American edition. AT Jeux published a French version of Flagship.

Carol Mulholland assumed editorial duties as of issue No. 70, and in 2002, the magazine expanded coverage to encompass other types of games such as boardgames, card games, computer games, and others.

Shortly after publishing issue 130 in 2010, Mulholland suffered a serious illness and the magazine ceased publication.

== Contents ==
The magazine came out bimonthly with game reviews, diaries, news columns and an emphasis on reader feedback. An average issue in 1987 was about 56 pages, and was divided into four sections:

1. "Explorers Findings": Game reviews
2. "Professional Secrets": Hints, strategy and advice.
3. "Ghost in the Machine": How to design PBM games.
4. A section of fiction and articles written by gamers based on PBM games

A final section at the back of the magazine contained press releases from PBM publishers.

== Reception ==
In Issue 30 of the American magazine Abyss (Summer 1984), John Bashaw noted the magazine had "so-so art [but] with excellent printing and production." Bashaw found the game reviews to be "intelligent and fair", but found the hints and strategies section "a little more biased than the reviews, and is mostly slanted to how the author things a given game should be played." Bashaw thought the price for the American edition ($11 for four issues or $3 each) was a bit steep "since about 9 pages [out of 34] are advertising." Bashaw concluded, "I recommend Flagship... If you are interested in PBM games, buy an issue to see what goes on."

David Webber, the editor in chief of Paper Mayhem, a US-based play-by-mail gaming magazine, stated in 1987 that Flagship was "a highly professional PBM magazine", noting that the published material was "very informative and each issue usually cover[ed] several current PBM games from the UK and the US". Webber asserted that Flagship was "a must for the PBM gamer", observing that the content and reliability of the magazine were very good, and recommending it to his own readers.

In Issue 21 of the British magazine The Games Machine, John Woods commented "Flagship is the most professional looking magazine for the hobby. It's usually around sixty A4 pages and is a very well-written read. The reviews are always very comprehensive, but the news often suffers from being out of date, and there's also a fair amount of coverage of US games. Also the reviews of new games generally take a long time to appear." Woods concluded, "It's perhaps a little pricey at £2.25 an issue (£8 a year) but well worth it considering the depth of coverage."

== Reviews ==
- Imagine #10
- Imagine #13
- Imagine #16

== See also ==
- Gaming Universal Magazine (Play-by-mail magazine)
- List of play-by-mail games
- The Nuts & Bolts of PBM (Play-by-mail magazine)
- Paper Mayhem Magazine (Play-by-mail magazine)
