= Play-by-mail game =

Games played through postal mail, email or other digital media

Four-time Origins Award-winning play-by-mail game Starweb

A play-by-mail game (also known as a PBM game, PBEM game, turn-based game, turn based distance game, or an interactive strategy game. (Note: Turn-based games (TBGs) that evolved from the PBM genre are a subset of TBGs.)) is a game played through postal mail, email or other digital media. Correspondence chess and Go were among the first PBM games. Diplomacy has been played by mail since 1963, introducing a multi-player aspect to PBM games. Flying Buffalo Inc. pioneered the first commercially available PBM game in 1970. A small number of PBM companies followed in the 1970s, with an explosion of hundreds of startup PBM companies in the 1980s at the peak of PBM gaming popularity, many of them small hobby companies—more than 90 percent of which eventually folded. A number of independent PBM magazines also started in the 1980s, including The Nuts & Bolts of PBM, Gaming Universal, Paper Mayhem and Flagship. These magazines eventually went out of print, replaced in the 21st century by the online PBM journal Suspense and Decision.

Play-by-mail games (which became known as turn-based games in the digital age) have a number of advantages and disadvantages compared to other kinds of gaming. PBM games have wide ranges for turn lengths. Some games allow turnaround times of a day or less—even hourly. Other games structure multiple days or weeks for players to consider moves or turns and players never run out of opponents to face. If desired, some PBM games can be played for years. Additionally, the complexity of PBM games can be far beyond that allowed by a board game in an afternoon, and pit players against live opponents in these conditions—a challenge some players enjoy. PBM games allow the number of opponents or teams in the dozens—with some previous examples over a thousand players. PBM games also allow gamers to interact with others globally. Games with low turn costs compare well with expensive board or video games. Drawbacks include the price for some PBM games with high setup and/or turn costs, and the lack of the ability for face-to-face roleplaying. Additionally, for some players, certain games can be overly complex, and delays in turn processing can be a negative.

Play-by-mail games are multifaceted. In their earliest form they involved two players mailing each other directly by postal mail, such as in correspondence chess. Multi-player games, such as Diplomacy or more complex games available today, involve a game master who receives and processes orders and adjudicates turn results for players. These games also introduced the element of diplomacy in which participants can discuss gameplay with each other, strategize and form alliances. In the 1970s and 1980s, some games involved turn results adjudicated completely by humans. Over time, partial or complete turn adjudication by computer became the norm. Games also involve open- and closed-end variants. Open-ended games do not normally end and players can develop their positions to the fullest extent possible; in closed-end games, players pursue victory conditions until a game conclusion. PBM games enable players to explore a diverse array of roles, such as characters in fantasy or medieval settings, space opera, inner city gangs, or more unusual ones such as assuming the role of a microorganism or a monster.

== History ==
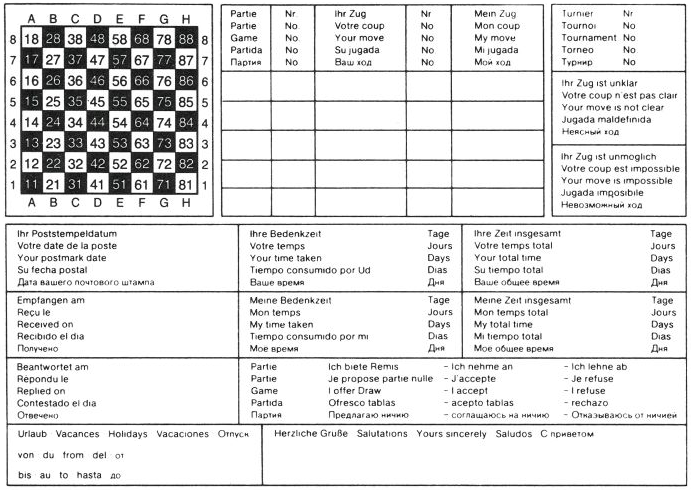
Postcard for international correspondence chess

The earliest play-by-mail games developed as a way for geographically separated gamers to compete with each other using postal mail. Chess and Go are among the oldest examples of this. In these two-player games, players sent moves directly to each other. Multi-player games emerged later: Diplomacy is an early example of this type, emerging in 1963, in which a central game master manages the game, receiving moves and publishing adjudications. According to Shannon Appelcline, there was some PBM play in the 1960s, but not much. For example, some wargamers began playing Stalingrad by mail in this period.

In the early 1970s, in the United States, Rick Loomis, of Flying Buffalo Inc., began a number of multi-player play-by-mail games; these included games such as Nuclear Destruction, which launched in 1970. This began the professional PBM industry in the United States. Professional game moderation started in 1971 at Flying Buffalo which added games such as Battleplan, Heroic Fantasy, Starweb, and others, which by the late 1980s were all computer moderated. (Note: John W. Kelly, Jr. and Mike Scheid also noted that Jim Dutton "decided to write a short story for each turn and the narrative game was born". Kelley and Scheid did not identify the timeframe or which company Dutton worked for.)

"Rick Loomis is generally recognized as the founder of the PBM industry."

— The Editors of Space Gamer Magazine, 1985.

For approximately five years, Flying Buffalo was the single dominant company in the US PBM industry until Schubel & Son entered the field in roughly 1976 with the human-moderated Tribes of Crane. (Note: Schubel and Son first entered the PBM field in 1974.) Schubel & Son introduced fee structure innovations which allowed players to pay for additional options or special actions outside of the rules. For players with larger bankrolls, this provided advantages and the ability to game the system. (Note: Mark Hill of Wired Magazine, stated in June 2021 that, "gamers have hated pay-to-win mechanics since the 1970s, when serious players of Tribes of Crane dropped hundreds of dollars on turns".) The next big entrant was Superior Simulations with its game Empyrean Challenge in 1978. Reviewer Jim Townsend asserted that it was "the most complex game system on Earth" with some large position turn results 1,000 pages in length.

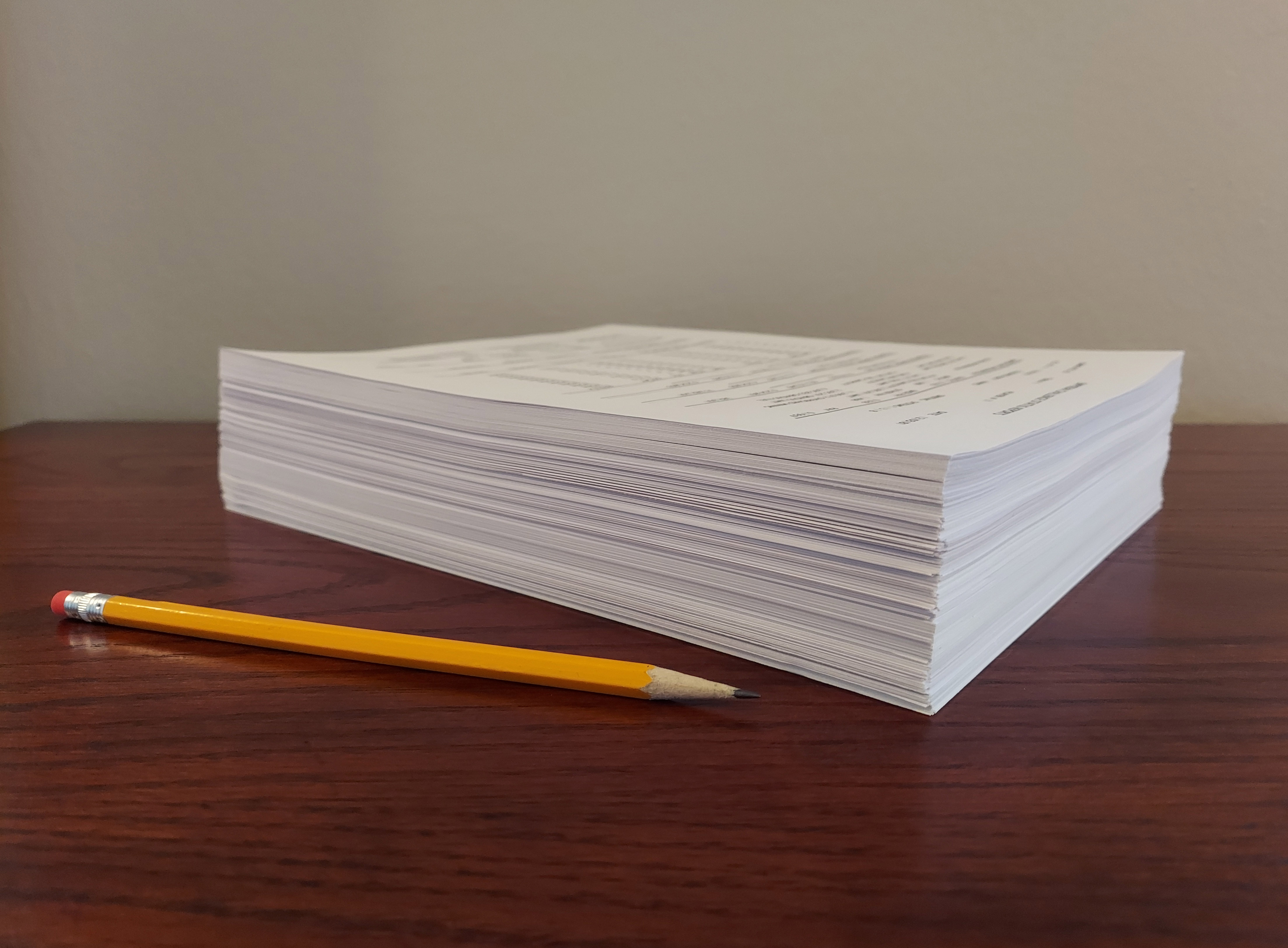
Turn results for Empyrean Challenge could be 1,000 pages in length.

Chris Harvey started the commercial PBM industry in the United Kingdom with a company called ICBM. After Harvey played Flying Buffalo's Nuclear Destruction game in the United States in approximately 1971, Rick Loomis suggested that he run the game in the UK with Flying Buffalo providing the computer moderation. ICBM Games led the industry in the UK as a result of this proxy method of publishing Flying Buffalo's PBM games, along with KJC games and Mitregames.

In the early 1980s, the field of PBM players was growing. Individual PBM game moderators were plentiful in 1980. (Note: The Space Gamer's "first annual survey of play-by-mail companies" stated that "[i]ndividual [PBM] moderators are much too numerous to list".) However, the PBM industry in 1980 was still nascent: there were still only two sizable commercial PBM companies, and only a few small ones. The most popular PBM games of 1980 were Starweb and Tribes of Crane. (Note: In their April 1981 issue, the editors of The Space Gamer magazine published their 1980 Game Survey results, listing the following PBM games in order of reader ranking from 1–9: Universe II (7.2), Pellic Quest (6.3), Wofan (6.3), Starweb (6.2) The Assassin's Quest (6.0), Star Cluster Omega (6.0), Warp Force One (5.7), Nuclear Destruction (5.5), Battle Plan (5.1), Star Master (5.1), Galaxy II (5.0), The Tribes of Crane (5.0), Empyrean Challenge (4.7), Arena Combat (3.8), and Lords of Valetia (1.8).)

Some players, unhappy with their experiences with Schubel & Son and Superior Simulations, launched their own company—Adventures by Mail—with the game, Beyond the Stellar Empire, which became "immensely popular". In the same way, many people launched PBM companies, trying their hand at finding the right mix of action and strategy for the gaming audience of the period. According to Jim Townsend:

In the late 70's and all of the 80's, many small PBM firms have opened their doors and better than 90% of them have failed. Although PBM is an easy industry to get into, staying in business is another thing entirely. Literally hundreds of PBM companies have come and gone, most of them taking the money of would-be-customers with them.

Townsend emphasized the risks for the PBM industry in that "The new PBM company has such a small chance of surviving that no insurance company would write a policy to cover them. Skydivers are a better risk." W.G. Armintrout wrote a 1982 article in The Space Gamer magazine warning those thinking of entering the professional PBM field of the importance of playtesting games to mitigate the risk of failure. By the late 1980s, of the more than one hundred play-by-mail companies operating, the majority were hobbies, not run as businesses to make money. Townsend estimated that, in 1988, there were about a dozen profitable PBM companies in the United States—with an additional few in the United Kingdom and the same in Australia. Sam Roads of Harlequin Games similarly assessed the state of the PBM industry in its early days (Note: Roads did not give an exact year, but discussed a period prior to widespread use of email when PBM players used telephones to conduct diplomacy.) while also noting the existence of few non-English companies.

By the 1980s, interest in PBM gaming in Europe increased. The first UK PBM convention was in 1986. In 1993, the founder of Flagship magazine, Nick Palmer, stated that "recently there has been a rapid diffusion throughout continental Europe where now there are now thousands of players". In 1992, Jon Tindall stated that the number of Australian players was growing, but limited by a relatively small market base. (Note: Flagship listed 19 Australian PBM companies in the same year.) In a 2002 listing of 182 primarily European PBM game publishers and Zines, Flagship listed ten non-UK entries, to include one each from Austria and France, six from Germany, one from Greece and one from the Netherlands. (Note: This selection does not include two listed U.S. Zines, nor does it account for countries of PBM game publishers with no listed physical address—only a web address with a .com-based URL. In a 1995 issue of Flagship, its "Galactic View" list of PBM game companies listed a Brazilian company.)

List of PBM Game Ratings from the November–December 1993 issue of Paper Mayhem magazine

PBM games up to the 1980s came from multiple sources: some were adapted from existing games and others were designed solely for postal play. In 1985, Pete Tamlyn stated that most popular games had already been attempted in postal play, noting that none had succeeded as well as Diplomacy. Tamlyn added that there was significant experimentation in adapting games to postal play at the time and that most games could be played by mail. These adapted games were typically run by a gamemaster using a fanzine to publish turn results. The 1980s were also noteworthy in that PBM games designed and published in this decade were written specifically for the genre versus adapted from other existing games. Thus they tended to be more complicated and gravitated toward requiring computer assistance.

The proliferation of PBM companies in the 1980s supported the publication of a number of newsletters from individual play-by-mail companies as well as independent publications which focused solely on the play-by-mail gaming industry. As of 1983, The Nuts & Bolts of PBM was the primary magazine in this market. In July 1983, the first issue of Paper Mayhem was published. The first issue was a newsletter with a print run of 100. Flagship began publication in the United Kingdom in October 1983, the month before Gaming Universal's first issue was published in the United States. In the mid-1980s, general gaming magazines also began carrying articles on PBM and ran PBM advertisements. (Note: Loomis also noted that the Origins Awards began a "Best PBM Game" category in this period.) PBM games were featured in magazines like Games and Analog in 1984. In the early 1990s, Martin Popp also began publishing a quarterly PBM magazine in Sulzberg, Germany called Postspielbote. (Note: The magazine was published in German.) The PBM genre's two preeminent magazines of the period were Flagship and Paper Mayhem.

In 1984, the PBM industry created a Play-by-Mail Association. This organization had multiple charter members by early 1985 and was holding elections for key positions. One of its proposed functions was to reimburse players who lost money after a PBM business failed.

Paul Brown, the president of Reality Simulations, Inc., estimated in 1988 that there were about 20,000 steady play-by-mail gamers, with potentially another 10–20,000 who tried PBM gaming but did not stay. Flying Buffalo Inc. conducted a survey of 167 of its players in 1984. It indicated that 96% of its players were male with most in their 20s and 30s. Nearly half were white collar workers, 28% were students, and the remainder engineers and military.

The 1990s brought changes to the PBM world. In the early 1990s, trending PBM games increased in complexity. In this period, email also became an option to transmit turn orders and results. These are called play-by-email (PBEM) games. Flagship reported in 1992 that they knew of 40 PBM gamemasters on Compuserve. One publisher in 2002 called PBM games "Interactive Strategy Games". Turn around time ranges for modern PBM games are wide enough that PBM magazine editors now use the term "turn-based games". Flagship stated in 2005 that "play-by-mail games are often called turn-based games now that most of them are played via the internet". In the 2023 issues of Suspense & Decision, the publisher used the term "Turn Based Distance Gaming".

In the early 1990s, the PBM industry still maintained some of the player momentum from the 1980s. For example, in 1993, Flagship listed 185 active play-by-mail games. Patrick M. Rodgers also stated in Shadis magazine that the United States had over 300 PBM games. And in 1993, the Journal of the PBM Gamer stated that "For the past several years, PBM gaming has increased in popularity." That year, there were a few hundred PBM games available for play globally. (Note: PBM commentator Patrick Rogers stated that PBM popularity was highest in the US at the time.) However, in 1994, David Webber, Paper Mayhem's editor in chief expressed concern about disappointing growth in the PBM community and a reduction in play by established gamers. At the same time, he noted that his analysis indicated that more PBM gamers were playing less, giving the example of an average drop from 5–6 games per player to 2–3 games, suggesting it could be due to financial reasons. In early 1997, David Webber stated that multiple PBM game moderators had noted a drop in players over the previous year.

By the end of the 1990s, the number of PBM publications had also declined. Gaming Universal's final publication run ended in 1988. Paper Mayhem ceased publication unexpectedly in 1998 after Webber's death. Flagship also later ceased publication. (Note: Charles Mosteller, the editor in chief of Suspense and Decision, noted in its November 2013 inaugural issue that Flagship's final issue had been previously published without providing a date. Flagship magazine's webpage lists its most recent issue (No. 130) with a copyright date of 2010.)

The Internet affected the PBM world in various ways. Rick Loomis stated in 1999 that, "With the growth of the Internet, [PBM] seems to have shrunk and a lot of companies dropped out of the business in the last 4 or 5 years." Shannon Appelcline agreed, noting in 2014 that, "The advent of the Internet knocked most PBM publishers out of business." The Internet also enabled PBM to globalize between the 1990s and 2000s. Early PBM professional gaming typically occurred within single countries. In the 1990s, the largest PBM games were licensed globally, with "each country having its own licensee". By the 2000s, a few major PBM firms began operating globally, bringing about "The Globalisation of PBM" according to Sam Roads of Harlequin Games.

By 2014 the PBM community had shrunk compared to previous decades. A single PBM magazine exists—Suspense and Decision—which began publication in November 2013. The PBM genre has also morphed from its original postal mail format with the onset of the digital age. In 2010, Carol Mulholland—the editor of Flagship—stated that "most turn-based games are now available by email and online". The online Suspense & Decision Games Index, as of June 2021, listed 72 active PBM, PBEM, and turn-based games. In a multiple-article examination of various online turn-based games in 2004 titled "Turning Digital", Colin Forbes concluded that "the number and diversity of these games has been enough to convince me that turn-based gaming is far from dead".

== Advantages and disadvantages of PBM gaming ==
"PBM games blow the doors off of anything in the face-to-face or computer game market."

— Jim Townsend, White Wolf No. 9. 1988.

Judith Proctor noted that play-by-mail games have a number of advantages. These include (1) plenty of time—potentially days—to plan a move, (2) never lacking players to face who have "new tactics and ideas", (3) the ability to play an "incredibly complex" game against live opponents, (4) meeting diverse gamers from far-away locations, and (5) relatively low costs. In 2019, Rick McDowell, designer of Alamaze, compared PBM costs favorably with the high cost of board games at Barnes & Noble, with many of the latter going for about US$70, and a top-rated game, Nemesis, costing $189. Andrew Greenberg pointed to the high number of players possible in a PBM game, comparing it to his past failure at attempting once to host a live eleven-player Dungeons & Dragons Game. (Note: Jim Townsend stated in 1990 that PBM game participation at the high end could involve more than a thousand players.) Flagship noted in 2005 that "It's normal to play these ... games with international firms and a global player base. Games have been designed that can involve large numbers of players – much larger than can gather for face-to-face gaming." Finally, some PBM games can be played for years, if desired.

Greenberg identified a number of drawbacks for play-by-mail games. He stated that the clearest was the cost, because most games require a setup cost and a fee per turn, and some games can become expensive. Another drawback is the lack of face-to-face interaction inherent in play-by-mail games. Finally, game complexity in some cases and occasional turn processing delays can be negatives in the genre.

== Description ==
PBM games can include combat, diplomacy, politics, exploration, economics and role-playing, with combat a usual feature and open-ended games typically the most comprehensive. Jim Townsend identifies the two key figures in PBM games as the players and the moderators, the latter of which are companies that charge "turn fees" to players—the cost for each game turn. In 1993, Paper Mayhem—a magazine for play-by-mail gamers—described play-by-mail games thus:

PBM Games vary in the size of the games, turn around time, length of time a game lasts, and prices. An average PBM game has 10–20 players in it, but there are also games that have hundreds of players. Turn around time is the length of time it takes to get your turn back from a company. ... Some games never end. They can go on virtually forever or until you decide to drop. Many games have victory conditions that can be achieved within a year or two. Prices vary for the different PBM games, but the average price per turn is about $5.00.

The earliest PBM games were played using the postal services of the respective countries. In 1990, the average turn-around time for a turn was 2–3 weeks. However, in the 1990s, email was introduced to PBM games. This was known as play-by-email (PBEM). Some games used email solely, while others, such as Hyborian War, used email as options for a portion of turn transmittal, with postal service for the remainder. Other games use digital media or web applications to allow players to make turns at speeds faster than postal mail. Given these changes, the term "turn-based games" is now being used by some commentators.

=== Mechanics ===
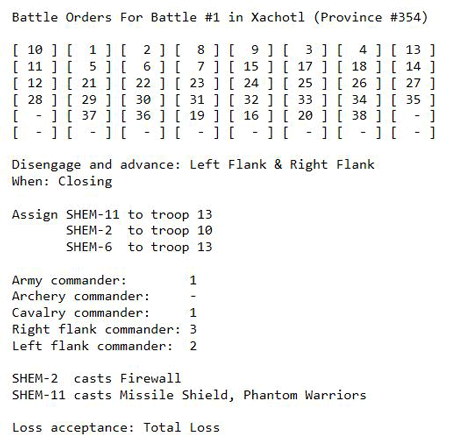
Example player orders in email format for a portion of a turn in the game Hyborian War.

After the initial setup of a PBM game, players begin submitting turn orders. In general, players fill out an order sheet for a game and return it to the gaming company. The company processes the orders and sends back turn results to the players so they can make subsequent moves.

R. Danard further separates a typical PBM turn into four parts. First, the company informs players on the results of the last turn. Next players conduct diplomatic activities, if desired. Then, they send their next turns to the gamemaster (GM). Finally, the turns are processed and the cycle is repeated. This continues until the game or a player is done.

=== Complexity ===
Jim Townsend stated in a 1990 issue of White Wolf Magazine that the complexity of PBM games is much higher than other types on the average. He noted that PBM games at the extreme high end can have a thousand or more players as well as thousands of units to manage, while turn printouts can range from a simple one-page result to hundreds of pages (with three to seven as the average). (Note: The PBM game Eressea had over 1,800 players in 2001.) According to John Kevin Loth, "Novices should appreciate that some games are best played by veterans." In 1986, he highlighted the complexity of Midgard with its 100-page instruction manual and 255 possible orders. A.D. Young stated in 1982 that computers could assist PBM gamers in various ways including accounting for records, player interactions and movements, as well as computation or analysis specific to individual games.

Reviewer Jim Townsend asserted that Empyrean Challenge was "the most complex game system on Earth". (Note: Vern Holford, owner of Superior Simulations, developed Empyrean Challenge, a PBM game that reviewer Jim Townsend described in 1988 as "the most complex game system on Earth" with some turn results for large positions at 1,000 pages in length. According to Townsend, in those cases there was a significant investment in time to understand what happened on a turn as well as to fill out future turn orders. He said a player without a spreadsheet was "nearly doomed from the outset".) Other games, like Galactic Prisoners began simply and gradually increased in complexity. As of August 2021, Rick Loomis PBM Games' had four difficulty levels: easy, moderate, hard and difficult, with games such as Nuclear Destruction and Heroic Fantasy on the easy end and Battleplan—a military strategy game—rated as difficult.

=== Diplomacy ===
According to Paper Mayhem assistant editor Jim Townsend, "The most important aspect of PBM games is the diplomacy. If you don't communicate with the other players you will be labeled a 'loner', 'mute', or just plain 'dead meat'. You must talk with the others to survive". The editors of Paper Mayhem add that "The interaction with other players is what makes PBM enjoyable."

Commentator Rob Chapman in a 1983 Flagship article echoed this advice, recommending that players get to know their opponents. He also recommended asking direct questions of opponents on their future intentions, as their responses, true or false, provide useful information. However, he advises players to be truthful in PBM diplomacy, as a reputation for honesty is useful in the long-term. Chapman notes that "everything is negotiable" and advises players to "Keep your plans flexible, your options open – don't commit yourself, or your forces, to any long term strategy".

Eric Stehle, owner and operator of Empire Games in 1997, stated that some games cannot be won alone and require diplomacy. He suggested considering the following diplomatic points during gameplay:

1. "Know Your Neighbors"
2. "Make Sure Potential Allies Share Your Goals"
3. "Be A Good Ally"
4. "Coordinate Carefully With Your Allies"
5. "Be A Vicious Enemy"
6. "Fight One Enemy At A Time"

=== Game types and player roles ===
Example character from the game Monster Island

Jim Townsend noted in 1990 that hundreds of PBM games were available, ranging from "all science fiction and fantasy themes to such exotics as war simulations (generally more complex world war games than those which wargamers play), duelling games, humorous games, sports simulations, etc". In 1993, Steve Pritchard described PBM game types as ancient wargames, diplomacy games, fantasy wargames, power games, roleplaying games, and sports games. Some PBM games defy easy categorization, such as Firebreather, which Joey Browning, the editor of the U.S. Flagship described as a "Fantasy Exploration" game. (Note: Browning likened Firebreather to games like Monster Island, Quest, and Lost Knowledge.)

Play-by-mail games also provide a wide array of possible roles to play. These include "trader, fighter, explorer, [and] diplomat". Roles range from pirates to space characters to "previously unknown creatures". In the game Monster Island, players assume the role of a monster which explores a massive island (see image). And the title of the PBM game You're An Amoeba, GO! indicates an unusual role as players struggle "in a 3D pool of primordial ooze [directing] the evolution of a legion of micro-organisms". (Note: Games with unusual player types have mixed success in PBM, with Dinowars (as dinosaurs), Mall Maniacs (as a consumer), Subterranea (as an ant), and Warboid World (as a computer) proving unsuccessful, while Lizards and You're An Amoeba, GO! enjoyed more favorable results.) Loth advises that closer identification with a role increases enjoyment, but prioritizing this aspect requires more time searching for the right PBM game.

=== Closed versus open ended ===
According to John Kevin Loth III, open-ended games do not end and there is no final objective or way to win the game. Jim Townsend adds that, "players come and go, powers grow and diminish, alliances form and dissolve and so forth". Since surviving, rather than winning, is primary, this type of game tends to attract players more interested in role-playing, and Townsend echoes that open-ended games are similar to long-term RPG campaigns. A drawback of this type is that mature games have powerful groups that can pose an unmanageable problem for the beginner – although some may see this situation as a challenge of sorts. Examples of open ended games are Heroic Fantasy, Monster Island, and SuperNova: Rise of the Empire. Townsend noted in 1990 that some open-ended games had been in play for up to a decade.

Townsend states that "closed-ended games are like Risk or Monopoly – once they're over, they're over". Loth notes that most players in closed end games start equally and the games are "faster paced, usually more intense... presenting frequent player confrontation; [and] the game terminates when a player or alliance of players has achieved specific conditions or eliminated all opposition". Townsend stated in 1990 that closed-end games can have as few as ten and as many as eighty turns. Examples of closed-end games are Hyborian War, It's a Crime, and Starweb.

Companies in the early 1990s also offered games with both open- and closed-ended versions. Additionally, games could have elements of both versions; for example, in Kingdom, an open-ended PBM game published by Graaf Simulations, a player could win by accumulating 50,000 points.

=== Computer versus human moderated ===
In the 1980s, PBM companies began using computers to moderate games. This was in part for economic reasons, as computers allowed the processing of more turns than humans, but with less of a human touch in the prose of a turn result. According to John Kevin Loth III, one hundred percent computer-moderated games would also kill a player's character or empire emotionlessly, regardless of the effort invested. Alternatively, Loth noted that those preferring exquisite pages of prose would gravitate toward one hundred percent human moderation. Loth provided Beyond the Quadra Zone and Earthwood as popular computer-moderated examples in 1986 and Silverdawn and Sword Lords as one hundred percent human-moderated examples of the period. Borderlands of Khataj is an example of a game where the company transitioned from human- to computer-moderated to mitigate issues related to a growing player base.

In 1984, there was a shift toward mixed moderation—human moderated games with computer-moderated aspects such as combat. Examples included Delenda est Carthago, Star Empires, and Starglobe. In 1990, the editors of Paper Mayhem noted that there were games with a mix of computer and hand moderation, where games "would have the numbers run by the computer and special actions in the game would receive attention from the game master".

== Cost and turn processing time ==
Loth noted that, in 1986, US$3–5 per turn was the most prevalent cost. At the time, some games were free, while others cost as much as $100 per turn.

PBM magazine Paper Mayhem stated that the average turn processing time in 1987 was two weeks, and Loth noted that this was also the most common. Some companies offered longer turnaround times for overseas players or other reasons. In 1985, the publisher for Angrelmar: The Court of Kings scheduled three month turn processing times after a break in operations.

In 1986, play-by-email was a nascent service only being offered by the largest PBM companies. By the 1990s, players had more options for online play-by-mail games. For example, in 1995, World Conquest was available to play with hourly turns. In the 21st century, many games of this genre are called turn-based games and are played via the Internet.

Game turns can be processed simultaneously or serially. In simultaneously processed games, the publisher processes turns from all players together according to an established sequence. In serial-processed games, turns are processed when received within the determined turn processing window.

== Information sources ==
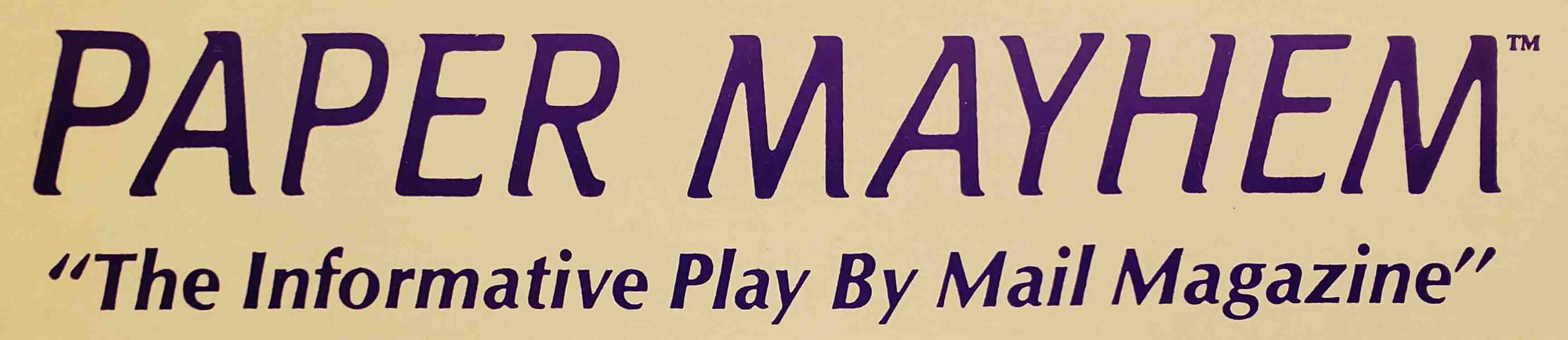
Logo of play-by-mail magazine Paper Mayhem

Rick Loomis of Flying Buffalo Games stated in 1985 that the Nuts & Bolts of PBM (first called Nuts & Bolts of Starweb) was the first PBM magazine not published by a PBM company. The name changed to Nuts & Bolts of Gaming and it eventually went out of print. In 1983, the US PBM magazines Paper Mayhem and Gaming Universal began publication as well as Flagship in the UK. Also in 1983, PBM games were featured in magazines like Games and Analog in 1984 as well as Australia's gaming magazine Breakout in 1992.

By 1985, Nuts & Bolts of Gaming and Gaming Universal in the US were out of print. John Kevin Loth identified that, in 1986, the "three major information sources in PBM" were Paper Mayhem, Flagship, and the Play By Mail Association. These sources were solely focused on play-by-mail gaming. Additional PBM information sources included company-specific publications, although Rick Loomis stated that interest was limited to individual companies". Finally, play-by-mail gamers could also draw from "alliances, associations, and senior players" for information.

In the mid-1980s, other gaming magazines also began venturing into PBM. For example, White Wolf Magazine began a regular PBM column beginning in issue #11 as well as publishing an annual PBM issue beginning with issue #16. The Space Gamer also carried PBM articles and reviews. Additional minor information sources included gaming magazines such as "Different Worlds ... Game New, Imagine, and White Dwarf". Dragon Publishing's Ares, Dragon, and Strategy and Tactics magazines provided PBM coverage along with Flying Buffalo's Sorcerer's Apprentice. Gaming magazine Micro Adventurer, which closed in 1985, also featured PBM games. Other PBM magazines in the late 1980s in the UK included Thrust, and Warped Sense of Humour.

In the early 1990s, Martin Popp also began publishing a quarterly PBM magazine in Sulzberg, Germany called Postspielbote. (Note: The magazine was published in German.) In 1995, Post & Play Unlimited stated that it was the only German-language PBM magazine. In its March 1992 issue, Flagship stated that it checked Simcoarum Bimonthly for PBM news. (Note: The editor, Bob Bost, noted that this magazine had mainly Simcoarum Games-related content, but also some broader PBM news.) Shadis magazine stated in 1994 that it had begun carrying a 16-page PBM section. This section, called "Post Marque", was discontinued after the March/April 1995 issue (#18), after which PBM coverage was integrated into other magazine sections. (Note: Flagship also stated in its January–February 1995 issue that Shadis's "Post Marque" section was about to be closed.) In its January–February 1995 issue, Flagship's editor noted that their "main European competitor" PBM Scroll had gone out of print.

Flagship ran into the 21st century, but ceased publication in 2010. In November 2013, online PBM journal Suspense & Decision, began publication.

== Fiction ==
Besides articles and reviews on PBM games, authors have also published PBM fiction articles according to Shannon Muir. An early example is "Scapegoat" by Mike Horn, which appeared in the May–June 1984 issue of Paper Mayhem magazine. Other examples include "A Loaf of Bread" by Suzanna Y. Snow about the game A Duel of a Different Color, "Dark Beginnings" by Dave Bennett about Darkness of Silverfall, and Chris Harvey's "It Was the Only Thing He Could Do..." about a conglomeration of PBM games. Simon Williams, the gamemaster of the PBM game Chaos Trail in 2004, also wrote an article in Flagship about the possibility of writing a PBM fiction novel.

The main character of John Darnielle's 2014 novel Wolf in White Van runs a play-by-mail role-playing game.

== See also ==
- List of play-by-mail games
- Play-by-post role-playing game
- Turn-based game
