= Paper Mayhem =

American play-by-mail game magazine

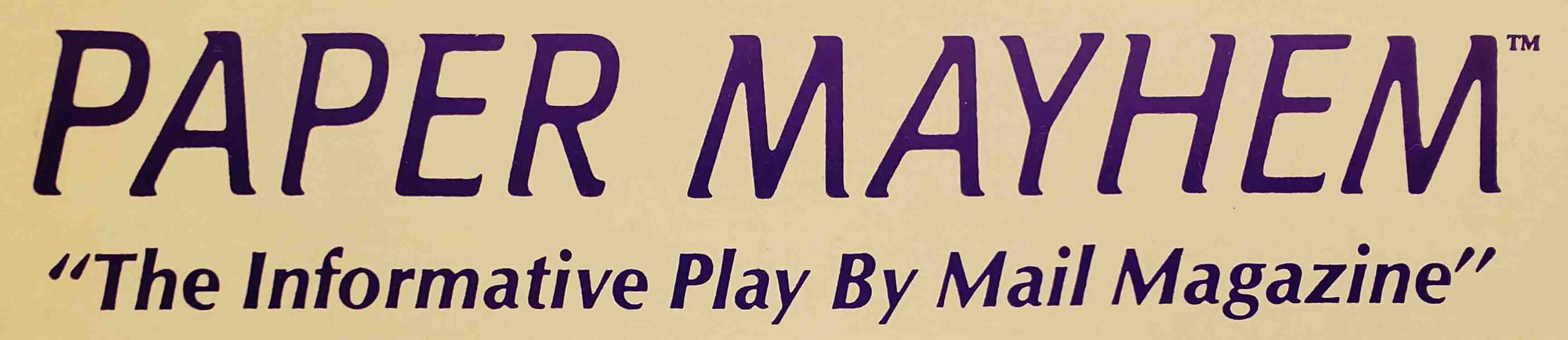
- Editor: Chris Derbacher, Jr. / David Webber
- Assistant editor: Elaine Webber
- Staff editor: Bud Link
- Categories: Play-by-mail game magazine
- Frequency: Bi-monthly (every two months)
- Publisher: The Paper Mayhem Association
- Founder: Chris Derbacher, Paul Gehrke, David Webber
- First issue: July/August 1983
- Final issue Number: May/June 1998; 90
- Country: United States
- Language: English

Paper Mayhem is an out-of-print play-by-mail (PBM) game magazine that was published in Ottawa, Illinois. The staff published the initial issue in July 1983 and the magazine ran until mid-1998. Its format was 40 pages published six times per year. The magazine was the most well-known of the play-by-mail periodicals of the period, providing articles and reviews of play-by-mail games, as well as reader-informed ratings of play-by-mail companies, game masters (GMs) and games, both intermittently and on an annual basis. The magazine, along with its long-time editor-in-chief, David Webber, was influential in the play-by-mail community, even echoing into 21st century play-by-mail activities. The publication ceased suddenly in mid-1998 following the unexpected death of Webber.

== History ==
Rick Loomis of the game company Flying Buffalo, Inc. stated that, after the early 1970s, the play-by-mail community had sufficient interest to support only two magazines: Paper Mayhem, and Flagship (UK-based). (Note: As distinguished from bulletins or periodicals published by individual PBM companies with limited game coverage for their specific customer base.) In 1985—the second year of publication for Paper Mayhem—Loomis observed that the first run of Gaming Universal magazine had ceased publication, leaving Paper Mayhem as the single US PBM publication, which had started small but was improving every issue. By 1998, Dragon magazine editor, Roger E. Moore, stated that Paper Mayhem was the "best established and ... most informative" of the various play-by-mail magazines available at the time, providing "game reviews, playtesting notes, announcements, new releases, playing hints, and more" in every issue. Also in 1988, Frank Green, of the Copley News Service noted that journals like Paper Mayhem and Flagship were the only way during the period that potential gamers could hear about play-by-mail games besides word of mouth. In 1993 in the New York Times, Sally Paduch called Paper Mayhem one "of the [PBM] gaming industry's two preeminent magazines" along with Flagship. Mark Wardell, in the modern play-by-mail journal, Suspense & Decision, pointed to Paper Mayhem along with Flagship and The PBM Report as "publications who blazed the trail" before Suspense & Decision, providing their editorial staff inspiration.

Cover of Paper Mayhem Issue #83, March/April 1997

The magazine was formed by Christopher L. Derbacher, David Webber, and Paul Gehrke. Derbacher was the chief editor of the initial issues with Webber as assistant editor. The first issue was a newsletter with a print run of 100. It is extremely rare in the 21st century. In the November/December 1984 issue, Webber announced that he was assuming the editor-in-chief role as Derbacher had left to run his own PBM company. Paul Gehrke also later left for the same reason. As editor, Webber wrote an editorial on the future of play-by-mail gaming in each issue. Charles Mosteller, the founding editor of the modern, web-based PBM magazine Suspense & Decision argued that Webber was one of the most influential people in the play-by-mail industry during his time as editor of Paper Mayhem, and stated in 2014 that he consistently thought about Webber while editing.

Paper Mayhem ceased publication unexpectedly in 1998 after Webber's death. The final issue was the May/June 1998 issue No. 90. According to Bob McLain, Elaine Webber tried once to keep the magazine going but "got burned" and became "very leery of doing business with anyone else", which ended Paper Mayhem's run under the Webbers. McLain stated that Kerry Harrison announced his purchase of the magazine in 2001 and owned the Internet domain papermayhem.com until March 13, 2001, after which it expired from lack of renewal.

== Coverage ==
Paper Mayhem solely covered play-by-mail games. Sally Paduch noted in The New York Times in 1993 that the magazine provided descriptions of PBM games as well as game reviews, ratings, costs, and rules; gaming convention dates; and addresses for most of the PBM gaming companies of the period. Game ratings included periodic publication of best play-by-mail games and play-by-mail companies using averaged reader scores from 1 to 10 which also provided a canvass for the play-by-mail community of existing play-by-mail companies and games. The magazine also published recurring "best of" lists for the play-by-mail community, including annual "Best Play-By-Mail Game", "Best Game Master", and "Best Play-By-Mail Company", based on reader votes. According to the owner of Jolly Goblin Games of Canada in 1989, "most regular Canadian PBMer's read Paper Mayhem".

The magazine provided additional coverage of the play-by-mail community as well. For example, issues featured a "Gameline" section for play-by-mail companies to inform the community on updates to their games. Issues also contained a section called "PBM Activity Corner" which provided a short summary of key events in ongoing games for companies that wished to publish them for the gaming community. PBM Bulletin Boards were available in each issue for readers or companies to list notices to solicit playtesters, form clubs, etc. The Nov/Dec 1986 issue introduced a feature called the PBM Capsule for "mini-reviews" to provide additional coverage for the many PBM games on the market. These reviews were limited to 200–400 words with the intent to relate if a game was "computer or hand-moderated, close or open ended", identify its turn-around time, the cost, and high and low points. PBM Capsules also featured commentary on the state of various aspects of play-by-mail gaming, for example the current status of other play-by-mail gaming magazines like Flagship and Gaming Universal, as well as Questbusters which was a gaming newsletter but had PBM articles. Advertising by play-by-mail companies was significant. The May/June 1993 issue contained 44 advertisements for PBM games, as well as other PBM magazines and gaming conferences.

== In culture ==
A portion of an advertisement for a play-by-mail (PBM) game from Paper Mayhem Issue #61, July/August 1993

An article in the contemporary online journal for play-by-mail gamers, Suspense & Decision, noted that the "imaginative and colorful advertisements" in magazines in the 1970–1990s—including Paper Mayhem—served as "engines of war that helped PBM gaming to carve out its own place on the [broader] gaming scene".

Paper Mayhem issues can be found in gaming collections. For example, a number of issues are stored in the "Muir family collection on play-by-mail games" at the University of California. (Note: Shannon Muir and her father John both authored multiple articles on play-by-mail games, and Shannon Muir wrote for Paper Mayhem magazine.)

== Reviews ==
Rick Swan reviewed the magazine in a 1994 issue of Dragon. He stated that the magazine's "enthusiasm is contagious" and is "an invaluable resource for separating the cream from the crud. In addition to its comprehensive reviews, the magazine also features strategy articles, designer profiles, and a game chart that rates more than 70 games based on player satisfaction".

== See also ==
- List of play-by-mail games

== Bibliography ==
- Dragon Magazine (October 2, 1987). "Where's the PBM?" (PDF). Dragon Magazine. XII, No. 5, October, 1987 (126): 3.
- Grimfinger (August 17, 2011). "The Future of PBM Gaming". PlayByMail.net.
- Green, Frank (February 1, 1988). "Beyond the Worlds of the Monopoly Players". Hazleton-Standard Speaker. p. 33.
- Jolly Goblin Games (May–June 1989). "Gameline: Jolly Goblin Games". Paper Mayhem. No. 36. p. 23.
- Loomis, Rick (July–August 1985). "Rick Loomis on Play-By-Mail". Space Gamer: The Magazine of Adventure Gaming. No. 75. p. 36.
- McLain, Bob (May–June 2001). "News From America". Flagship. No. 91. p. 17.
- Loomis, Rick (December 2013). "Letter from Rick Loomis to the Play By Mail/Email/Web/Turn Based Games Community" (PDF). Suspense and Decision, Vol. No. 2. PlayByMail.net. p. 38. Archived from the original (PDF) on July 4, 2021.
- Moore, Roger E. (1988). "Other Guys" (PDF). Dragon Magazine. XII, No. 12, May, 1988 (133): 4.
- "Muir family collection on play-by-mail games". Online Archive of California. California Digital Library.
- Muir, Shannon (December 2013). "Using Play By Mail in a Novel's Plot: The Story Behind for the Love of Airagos" (PDF). Suspense and Decision, Vol. No. 5. PlayByMail.net. p. 14.
- Paduch, Sally (June 27, 1993). "Email Brings Immediacy to Play-By-Mail Games". New York Times. p. RC21.
- Paper Mayhem (July–August 1984). "Editorial". Paper Mayhem. No. 7. p. 3.
- Paper Mayhem (May–June 1989). "Gameline". Paper Mayhem. No. 36. pp. 20–26.
- Paper Mayhem (May–June 1989). "Advertisers Index". Paper Mayhem. No. 36. p. 39.
- Paper Mayhem (January–February 1990). "PBM Game Ratings". Paper Mayhem. No. 40. pp. 22–23.
- Swan, Rick (October 1994). "Role Playing Reviews: Paper Mayhem". Dragon. No. 210. p. 94.
- Spencer, David and Shannon Muir Broden (April 16, 2021). "Paper Mayhem: A Critical Resource During the Heyday of PBM Gaming". Suspense & Decision.
- Suspense and Decision (February 2014). "Where We're Going" (PDF). Suspense and Decision, Vol. No. 4. PlayByMail.net. p. 110. Archived from the original (PDF) on July 29, 2019.
- Wardell, Mark (November 2013). "Chronicles of the Mad Scientist" (PDF). Suspense and Decision, Vol. No. 1. PlayByMail.net. p. 1. Archived from the original (PDF) on June 26, 2019.
- Mosteller, Charles (March 2014). "Where We're Heading" (PDF). Suspense and Decision, Vol. No. 5. PlayByMail.net. p. 92.
- Webber, David (November–December 1984). "Where We're Heading...". Paper Mayhem. No. 9. p. 4.
- Webber, David (November–December 1986). "Where We're Heading...". Paper Mayhem. No. 21. p. 4.
- Webber, David (March–April 1987). "Flagship". Paper Mayhem. No. 23. p. 36.
- Webber, David (July–August 1987). "Where We're Heading…". Paper Mayhem. No. 25. p. 2.
- Zachary, Raven (March 11, 2021). "A Review of Paper Mayhem, Issue #60 (May/June 1993)". Suspense and Decision.
- Zachary, Raven (March 17, 2021). "A Collection of PBM History". Suspense and Decision.
