= Lords of the Earth =

Play-by-mail game

- Designers: Thomas Harlan
- Years active: 1983 to present
- Genres: play-by-mail
- Languages: English
- Players: 50–70
- Playing time: Fixed
- Materials required: Instructions, order sheets, turn results, paper, pencil
- Media type: Play-by-mail or email
- Website: lords.throneworld.com

Lords of the Earth (LOTE) is a play-by-email game, first published by Thomas Harlan in 1983 during a growing era of PBM games. Initially played by postal mail as well as in-person paper submissions, the game featured mixed moderation—computer moderated with some human assistance. By 2002, the publisher processed turns by email (PBeM). Lords of the Earth comprises multiple campaigns, each one a separate game. Each of these games is termed a "campaign," by analogy with a tabletop role-playing game, usually with a unique human moderator. Campaign 1 was the first, beginning in 1000 AD, and continuing to the 18th century, an "Age of Air and Steam." Other campaigns feature start dates from 2000 BC to 1400 AD. Settings were often global in scale, with one campaign featuring an outer space setting. Each campaign has an historical starting setup, from which flows an alternate history defined by player actions.

Campaigns are open-ended, with no set victory conditions. A game lasts about 25 years. Commonly 20 to 50 players compete as leaders of various types of nations. Regions in a campaign map include varied terrain, religions, wealth, and ability to resist others using diplomacy or warfare. Players move leaders across the map, often commanding military units, to perform actions. A reviewer in the early 2000s noted positives and negatives about the game, observing that some players went to great lengths to win, even "using false identities or smear campaigns".

== Play-by-mail genre ==
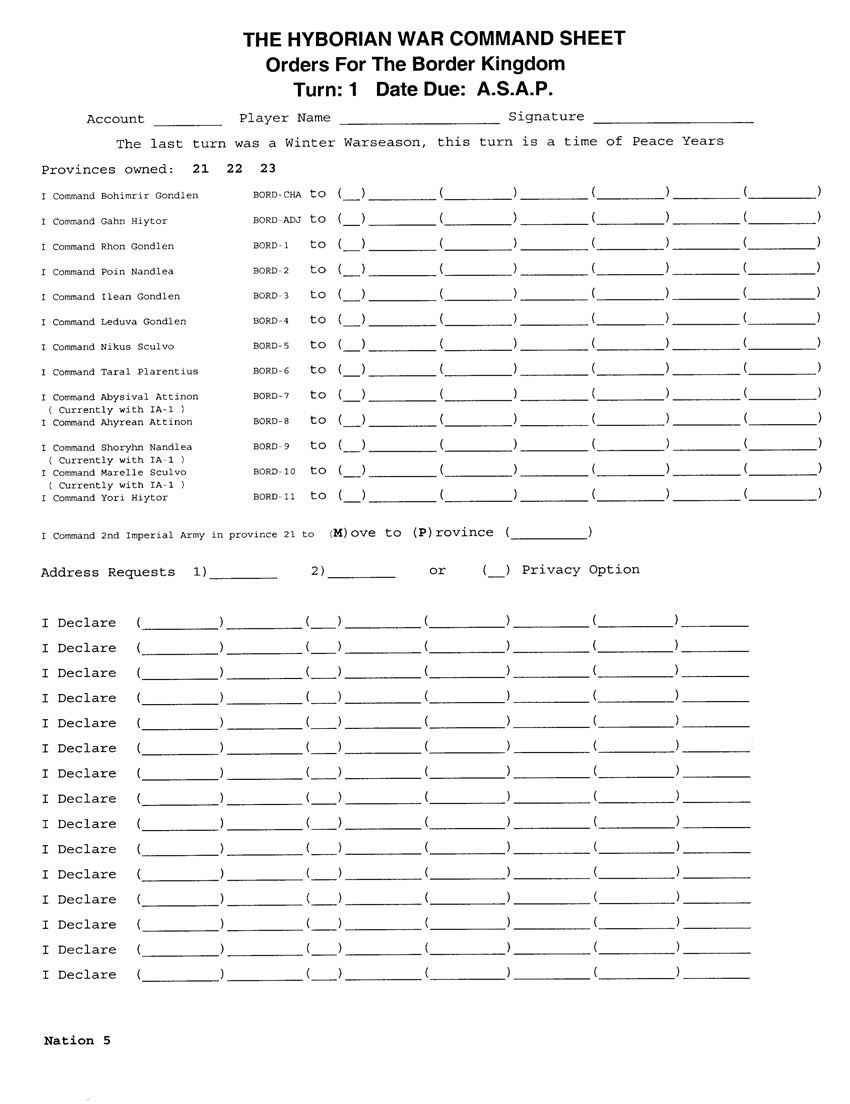
Example Hyborian War turn 1 order sheet for the Border Kingdom

Play-by-mail (PBM) games feature a number of differences from tabletop games. The typical PBM game involves many more players than an average tabletop game can support. (Note: For example, the PBM game It's a Crime can accommodate 110 players per game.) PBM game lengths are usually longer, depending on a number of factors. Turnaround time is how long a player has to prepare and submit "orders" (moves and changes to make in the game) and the company has to process them and send back turn results. The average turnaround time in the 1980s was two weeks, but some modern PBM games are play-by-email (PBEM) with shorter turnaround times of twice per week or faster. (Note: For example, the PBM game Covert Operations allows twice-per-week moves, daily moves, and private games where players can specify turn around times.) Open ended games allow players to strengthen their positions without end, with players continually entering and leaving the game. Examples include Heroic Fantasy and Monster Island. Conversely, closed end games typically have all players starting on equal terms, with rapid, intense, player vs. player gameplay that ends when a player or group achieves some victory condition or is unopposed. Examples include Hyborian War and It's a Crime. The complexity of PBM games can range from the relatively simple to the extremely complex. (Note: Vern Holford, owner of Superior Simulations, developed Empyrean Challenge, a PBM game that reviewer Jim Townsend described in 1988 as "the most complex game system on Earth" with some turn results for large positions at 1,000 pages in length. According to Townsend, in those cases there was a significant investment in time to understand what happened on a turn as well as to fill out future turn orders. He said a player without a spreadsheet was "nearly doomed from the outset".)

Once a player has chosen a game and receives an initial game setup, gameplay begins. This generally involves players filling out order sheets for a game (see example image) and sending them to the gaming company. The company processes the turns and returns the results to the player, who completes a subsequent order sheet. Diplomacy—interaction among players—is also frequently an important, and sometimes indispensable, part of gameplay. The initial choice of a PBM game requires consideration as there is a wide array of possible roles to play, from pirates to space characters to "previously unknown creatures". Close identification with a role typically increases a player's game satisfaction. (Note: This section is taken from the Play-by-mail genre section of the Hyborian War Wikipedia article.)

=== History ===
The earliest play-by-mail games developed as a way for geographically separated gamers to compete with each other using postal mail. Chess and Go are among the oldest examples of this. In these two-player games, players sent moves directly to each other. Multi-player games emerged later: Diplomacy is an early example of this type, emerging in 1963, in which a central game master manages the game, receiving moves and publishing adjudications. According to Shannon Appelcline, there was some PBM play in the 1960s, but not much. For example, some wargamers began playing Stalingrad by mail in this period.

"Rick Loomis is generally recognized as the founder of the PBM industry."

— The Editors of Space Gamer Magazine, 1985.

In the early 1970s, in the United States, Rick Loomis, of Flying Buffalo Inc., began a number of multi-player play-by-mail games; these included games such as Nuclear Destruction, which launched in 1970. This began the professional PBM industry in the United States. Professional game moderation started in 1971 at Flying Buffalo which later added games such as Battleplan, Starweb, and others, which by the late 1980s were all computer moderated. (Note: John W. Kelly, Jr. and Mike Scheid also noted that Jim Dutton "decided to write a short story for each turn and the narrative game was born". Kelley and Scheid did not identify the timeframe or which company Dutton worked for.)

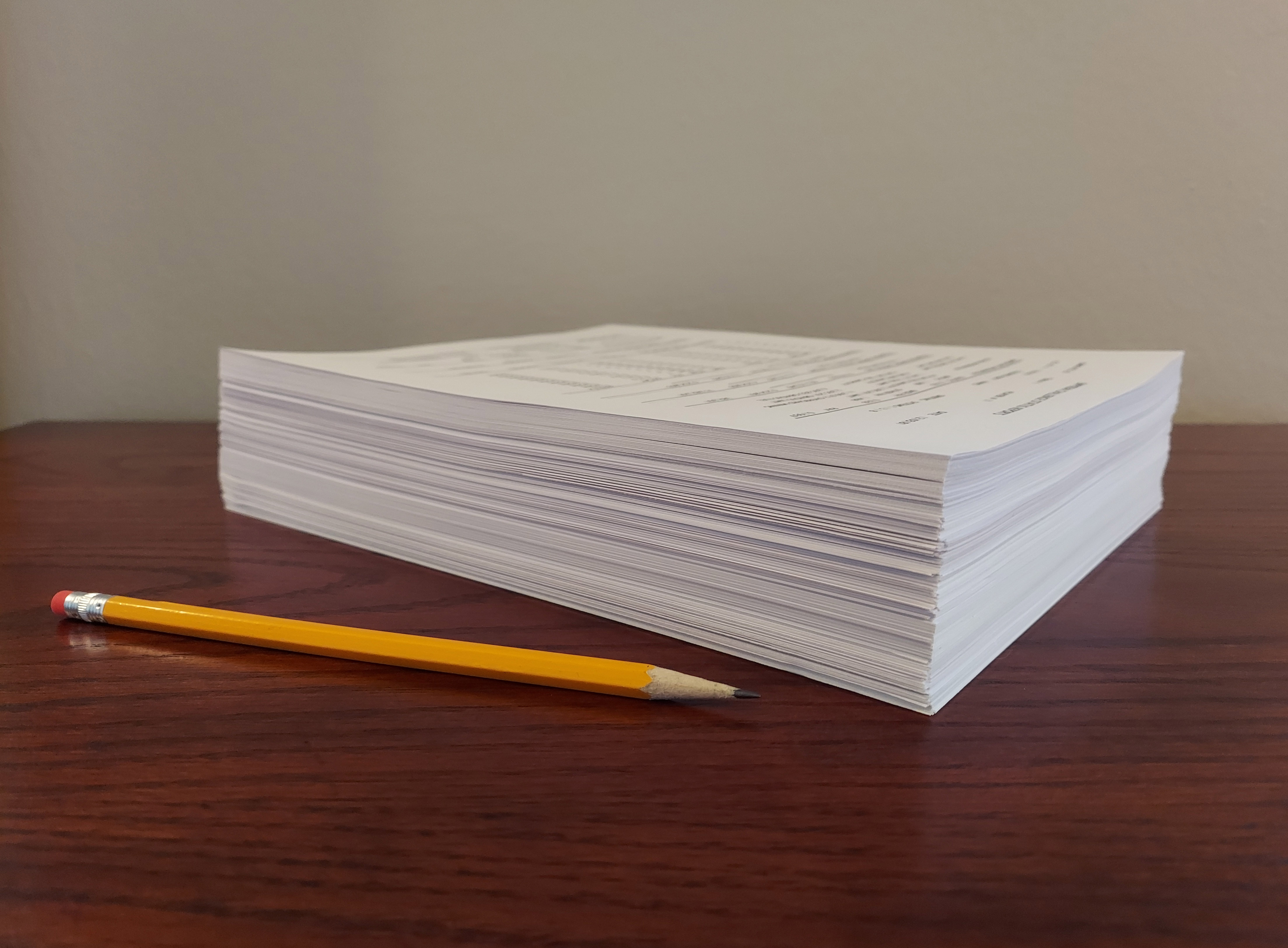
Turn results for Empyrean Challenge could be 1,000 pages in length.

For approximately five years, Flying Buffalo was the single dominant company in the US PBM industry until Schubel & Son entered the field in roughly 1976 with the human-moderated Tribes of Crane. (Note: Schubel and Son first entered the PBM field in 1974.) Schubel & Son introduced fee structure innovations which allowed players to pay for additional options or special actions outside of the rules. For players with larger bankrolls, this provided advantages and the ability to game the system. (Note: Mark Hill of Wired Magazine, stated in June 2021 that, "gamers have hated pay-to-win mechanics since the 1970s, when serious players of Tribes of Crane dropped hundreds of dollars on turns".) The next big entrant was Superior Simulations with its game Empyrean Challenge in 1978. Reviewer Jim Townsend asserted that it was "the most complex game system on Earth" with some large position turn results 1,000 pages in length.

In the early 1980s, the field of PBM players was growing. Individual PBM game moderators were plentiful in 1980. (Note: The Space Gamer's "first annual survey of play-by-mail companies" stated that "[i]ndividual [PBM] moderators are much too numerous to list".) However, the PBM industry in 1980 was still nascent: there were still only two sizable commercial PBM companies, and only a few small ones. The most popular games of 1980 were Starweb and Tribes of Crane. (Note: This section was taken from Wikipedia's Heroic Fantasy article.) It was in this environment that Thomas Harlan launched Lords of the Earth.

== Development ==
Lords of the Earth Campaign 1 started in 1983. It focused on nation development versus expansion by conquest. Thomas Harlan designed the original rules. In 1995, the game was run by postal mail and had mixed-moderation—hand moderated with computer assistance. By 2002, the game was play-by-email (PBeM). The same year, there were more than twenty active campaigns run by multiple gamemasters globally. The base rules were supplemented with a Renaissance and Industrial addition. A subsequent Modern Age rulebook combined all rules editions for the campaign. Gamemasters for subsequent campaigns could adjust Harlan's original rule set. Leslie Dodd added a diplomacy addendum to Campaign 42. In 2006 and 2007, Thomas Harlan and Martin Helsdon published the latest versions of the basic rulebook (encompassing 1000 to 2000 AD), a Modern Era supplement (covering the 1400s to 1800s), and a Space Age supplement (mid 20th to mid 21st century).

Campaign 1 was the first of many Lords of the Earth settings. In 2002, Martin Helsdon asserted that the first campaign (LOTE01) might have been the "longest continuously running PBM" game after over twenty years of play. Campaign 1 included players from across North America, as well as Australia, France, and the United Kingdom.

== Gameplay ==
Each player represents a nation, with more than fifty players competing in certain campaigns. Various nation types are available, depending on the campaign, such as barbarian, seafaring, secret nations, religious groups, and merchant consortia. Map regions have varied terrain, religions, wealth and the ability to resist others using diplomacy or warfare. (Note: This latter characteristic was the Regional Resistance Value (RRv).) Game turn periods usually begin at five years each and decrease as the game continues. The game is open-ended, with no set victory conditions. One game takes about 25 years.

According to Warren Bruhn, campaigns have started in periods from 2000 BC to 1400 AD. The game setting comprised 24 Geographic Zones. Although the global scale became typical, game settings have included outer space as well. As campaigns progress, nations' technology levels increase. By 2002, Campaign 1 gameplay had progressed from the year 1000 to 1752 AD. It was set in the "Age of Air and Steam" which was global in scale. Global calamities were much more frequent in Campaign 1 relative to other campaigns.

Gameplay spans combat, economics, intrigue, and social and cultural topics. Combat ability progresses with tech levels around cavalry, infantry, warship, and Siege capabilities. According to Martin Helsdon, in the game players can "found universities, build cities, create trade routes, massacre populations, enforce religious conversions, engage in both overt and covert warfare, forge alliances, break treaties, and sometimes suffer the dread dynastic failure, when their nation implodes". Engaging in diplomacy and developing public works contributes to success, with the latter returning outsized dividends for new players. Player interaction is significant, occurring by phone, email, and online discussions.

== Reception ==
Martin Helsdon reviewed the game in various issues of Flagship magazine in 2002–2003. He noted drawbacks such as lengthy rules and "GM burnout". He recommended the game, stating that it "is an intriguing and frustrating game with a depth and a breadth not equalled by any other I have encountered". He noted that some players took gameplay overly seriously, even "using false identities or smear campaigns". Andrew Barton reviewed the game in a 2000 issue of Flagship, noting positives and negatives about the rules. He stated that "Lords of the Earth allows you to ... role-play whole nations. I don't know of another PBM game quite like it".

== See also ==
- List of play-by-mail games

== Bibliography ==
- Appelcline, Shannon (2011). Designers & Dragons. Mongoose Publishing. ISBN 978-1-907702-58-7.
- Babcock, Chris (December 2013). "Diplomacy" (PDF). Suspense and Decision. No. 2. p. 16. Archived from the original (PDF) on July 4, 2021.
- Barton, Andrew (March–April 2000). "Lords of the Earth". Flagship. No. 84. pp. 13–16.
- Boomer, Sean M. (September–October 2003). "Lords of the Earth 42". Flagship. No. 104. pp. 22–23.
- Bruhn, Warren (1995). "Lords According to Bruhn".
- DuBois, Steven (January–February 1997). "Monster Island: A Review". Paper Mayhem. No. 82. p. 4.
- "Lords of the Earth: The Official Site".
- Editors (May–June 1984). "GamelineNews and Updates". Paper Mayhem. No. 6. pp. 18–20.
- Editors (September–October 1998). "The Spokesmen Speak: Lords of the Earth". Flagship. No. 75. p. 13.
- Greenberg, Andrew (May–June 1993). "PBM Corner: A Beginning in Play-By-Mail; Is it Worth It?". White Wolf Magazine. No. 36. pp. 8–9.
- Harding, Sean (1997). "Advice for New Players". lords.throneworld.com.
- Harlan, Thomas (2002). "Lords of the Earth: Basic Rulebook" (PDF). Throne Enterprises LLC.
- Harlan, Thomas (2007). "Lords of the Earth: Basic Rulebook" (PDF) (6th ed.). Throne Enterprises LLC. pp. i, 1.
- Harlan, Thomas (2007). "Lords of the Earth: The Modern Era; A Post-Medieval Rules Supplement" (PDF) (6th ed.). Throne Enterprises LLC. pp. i, 1.
- Helsdon, Martin (2006). "Lords of the Earth: The Space Age; A Future Rules Supplement" (PDF) (6th ed.). Throne Enterprises LLC. pp. i, 1.
- Helsdon, Martin (June–July 2002). "Lords of the Earth: Campaign One, Part 1" (PDF). Flagship. No. 97. pp. 16–17.
- Helsdon, Martin (August–September 2002). "Lords of the Earth: Campaign One, Part 2" (PDF). Flagship. No. 98. pp. 12–13.
- Helsdon, Martin (December 2002 – January 2003). "Lords of the Earth: Campaign One, An Age of Air and Steam – Part 4" (PDF). Flagship. No. 100. pp. 22–23.
- Helsdon, Martin (December 2003 – January 2004). "Lords of the Earth: Campaign 1: An Age of Air and Steam" (PDF). Flagship. No. 105. pp. 20–21.
- Hill, Mark (June 20, 2021). "Remember When Multiplayer Gaming Needed Envelopes and Stamps?". Wired.
- "It's a Crime (Rule Page)". KJC Games.
- Kelly, Jr, John W.; Scheid, Mike (May–June 1985). "Prehistoric PBM: First World in Review". Paper Mayhem. No. 12. p. 26.
- Lindahl, Greg. "PBM / PBEM List Index: closed-ended". Play by Email (PBeM) & Play by Mail (PBM) List Index.
- Loomis, Rick (April 1982). "Space Battle (Flying Buffalo, Inc.)". The Space Gamer. No. 50. p. 38.
- Loomis, Rick (May 1999). "The History of Play-by-Mail and Flying Buffalo" (PDF). Flying Buffalo Quarterly. No. 79. pp. 2–5.
- Loomis, Rick (December 2013). "Letter from Rick Loomis to the Play By Mail/Email/Web/Turn Based Games Community" (PDF). Suspense and Decision. No. 2. p. 38. Archived from the original (PDF) on July 4, 2021.
- "Lords of the Earth: Rulebooks and Errata". lords.throneworld.com.
- Loth III, John Kevin (March–April 1986). "A PBM Primer". Paper Mayhem. No. 17. p. 42.
- McLain, Bob (August 1, 1993). "Play By Mail: The Infancy of Cyberspace". Pyramid. sjgames.com.
- Mouchet, Paul (February 2017). "PBM: Reducing the "Barrier to Entry"" (PDF). Suspense and Decision. No. 15. PlayByMail.net. pp. 10–12. Archived from the original (PDF) on October 30, 2020.
- "Nuclear Destruction". Rick Loomis PBM Games.
- "Front Matter". Paper Mayhem. No. 58. January–February 1993. p. 1.
- Popolizio, Mike; LeBlanc, Liz; Popolizio, Marti (January–February 1990). "Revamping a Classic! The Redesign of BSE". Paper Mayhem. No. 40. pp. 8–10.
- "TSG Surveys: Play-By-Mail Game Companies". The Space Gamer. No. 33. November 1980. p. 13.
- Townsend, Jim (January–February 1987). "How to Win in PBM—An Organizational Viewpoint". Paper Mayhem. No. 22. p. 29.
- Townsend, Jim (1988). "The PBM Corner". White Wolf Magazine. No. 11. p. 20.
