= Galac-Tac =

Play-by-mail space exploration game

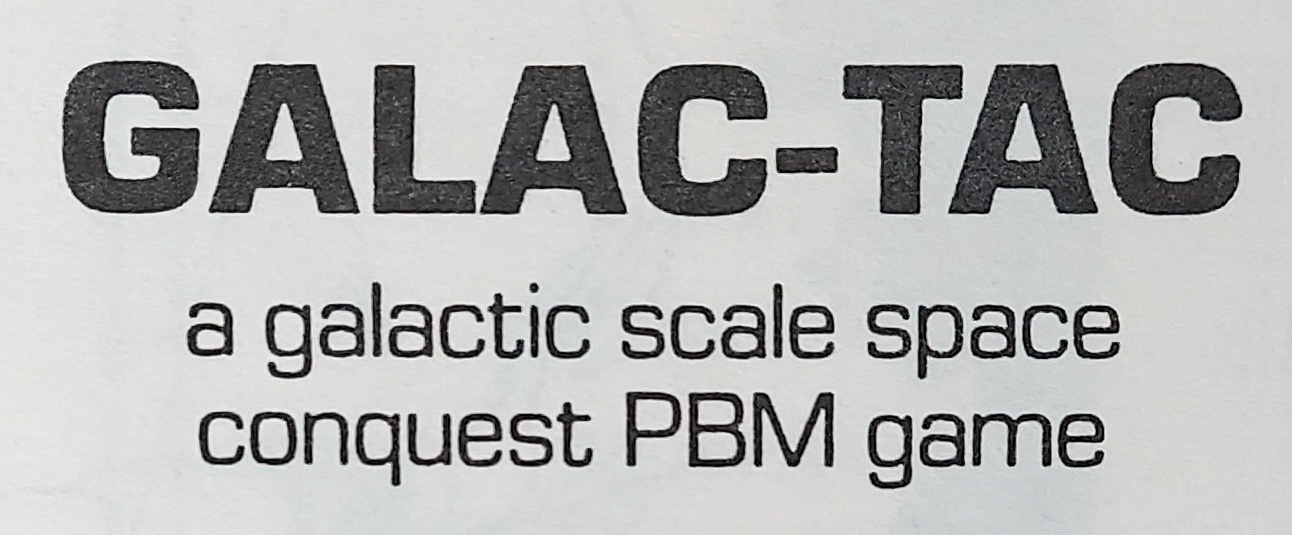
- Title image from 1984 issue of Paper Mayhem magazine.
- Publishers: Phoenix Publications, Delta Games, Talisman Games
- Publication: 1982; 44 years ago
- Genres: Science fiction, play-by-mail
- Languages: English
- Players: Typically 10–15
- Playing time: Varies, around 85–95 turns
- Materials required: Instructions, orders, turn results
- Media type: Play-by-mail or web
- Website: www.talisman-games.com/about_games#galactac

Galac-Tac is a closed-end, science fiction, play-by-mail (PBM) wargame, first published by Phoenix Publications in 1982. By 1990, the publisher had changed its name to Delta Games, and then later to Talisman Games. In 2010, Talisman Games changed ownership and transitioned Galac-Tac to a web-based game. It is still available for play by postal mail or email for those with web access challenges. The game has been updated as well as reviewed multiple times in its 40 years of active play. Various reviews in the 1980s and 1990s provided both positive and negative comments as well as potential areas for the game to improve. The game has been featured numerous times in the modern PBM magazine, Suspense & Decision.

During gameplay, players begin in one of hundreds of star systems in a 100 × 100 grid map with money and some basic ships, expanding to other star systems in search of resources. Players can establish colonies to enable further expansion. Military conflict is a significant factor in the game with great leeway in the design of fleets and the ability to design individual ships. Diplomacy, espionage, and technology research and development are also important parts of gameplay. The goal is to be the last player remaining or have the strongest position at game's end. Games last about 85 to 95 turns.

== Play-by-mail history ==
Some games have long been played by mail between two players, such as chess and Go. PBM play of Diplomacy—a multiplayer game—began in 1963. The emergence of the professional PBM industry occurred less than a decade later. Rick Loomis, "generally recognized as the founder of the PBM industry", accomplished this by launching Flying Buffalo Inc. and his first PBM game, Nuclear Destruction, in 1970. Professional game moderation started in 1971 at Flying Buffalo. (Note: Flying Buffalo later added games such as Battleplan and Heroic Fantasy along with Starweb and others. By the late 1980s these games were all computer moderated.) Chris Harvey started commercial PBM play afterward in the United Kingdom with a company called ICBM through an agreement with Loomis and Flying Buffalo. ICBM, followed by KJC games and Mitregames, led the UK PBM industry. For approximately five years, Flying Buffalo was the single dominant company in the US PBM industry until Schubel & Son entered the field in about 1976 with the human-moderated The Tribes of Crane. Superior Simulations was the next significant PBM company to enter the US market. They did so in 1978 with the game Empyrean Challenge which one observer stated was "the most complex game system on Earth". (Note: According to reviewer Jim Townsend, some turn results could be 1,000 pages in length and due to the occasional extended turn results there was a significant investment in time to understand what happened on a turn as well as to fill out future turn orders. He said a player without a spreadsheet was "nearly doomed from the outset".)

The early 1980s saw additional growth for PBM. The player base grew and game moderators were plentiful. The most popular games in 1980 were Starweb and Tribes of Crane. The PBM industry in 1980 comprised two large companies and some small ones. In 1981, some PBM players launched another company, Adventures by Mail, with the "immensely popular" Beyond the Stellar Empire. (Note: This section draws from portions of the History section of the Wikipedia Play-by-mail game article.) It was within this environment that Phoenix Publications launched Galac-Tac.

== Game development ==
Galac-Tac began in 1982 as a closed-end PBM game published by Phoenix Publications in Dallas, TX. The game was computer-moderated, but the gamemasters would handle "special situations". The original game program was "in APL on an IBM PC with a 10MB drive, 5.25 Floppy and 512K of RAM. It took 26 hours to run a single game turn for 15 players". Game processing improved over time, with a later turn on a 386 processor taking only five minutes.

In December 1983, as the game reached sixteen universes, the company had to close gameplay for reprogramming to allow faster processing as the original computer could only handle about seven universes. By 1990, the publisher name had changed to Delta Games. In the early postal mail version of the game, turnaround times for turns was two to three weeks. In 1990, Delta Games released an updated version. In 2010, husband and wife team Davin Church and Genny White (as well as their associate Doug Neman) as the new Talisman Games game owners began transitioning Galac-Tac to the web using a subscription business model. They also created the Galac-Tac Assistant (GTAC), which is still available as of November 2021. As of November 2021, the game can also be played by postal mail or email for those with no or limited web access, such as military, those in prison, or other cases.

== Gameplay ==
In the 21st-century version of the play-by-web game, players view the original position report and subsequent turn reports on the web where they also enter orders. Players begin the game in one of hundreds of star systems within a 100 × 100 grid map with some money—called Production Inventory (PI)—and basic ships. (Note: In the early version of the game, as of 1984, the galaxy was "roughly equal" to "100 by 60 light-years ... [with] 120 to 240 star systems, of which from 8 to 20 ... will be rival home systems also striving for expansion".) Players expand into other star systems in search of "raw material", or Production Value (PV) which can be sold on return. Colonies with Production Centers also enable conversion of raw materials to PI. Players can use scout ships for exploring, cargo ships for transporting PV, and warships for protecting claims and battling other players. Players are allowed 30 actions per turn. As of 1992, turns were written on an "action sheet" for the PBM version of the game. In the 21st century version of the game, entries are web-based and up to 50 actions are allowed per turn.

"The earliest recorded kill of an empire in Galac-Tac was on turn six."

— Jon Capps, Delta Games Gamemaster. Paper Mayhem, March–April 1990. (Note: Capps stated this within an explanation of a new version release for Galac-Tac. He further noted that "I was the one destroyed and it was in a test game with several friends. Since the new system went into effect, we have not had a kill within the first year (16 turns).")

Combat is consequential in Galac-Tac, and "[i]n the end, your military might and strategy will determine if you win or lose". Players have great leeway in the organization and programming of fleets, but fleets act autonomously during battles using only general directions from the player. Investing in technology research and development and conducting espionage are also important parts of gameplay. Diplomacy is also available in the game and "Timely negotiations should never be ruled out." Losing a Home World essentially ends a player's game. The purpose of the game is to eliminate all other players or be the strongest player at game's end. As of 2021, games last about 85–95 turns.

== Reception ==
Danial Dias reviewed the game in the May–June 1984 issue of Paper Mayhem magazine, stating that Galac-Tac is "a very good game," while pointing out the value for a player's money and good customer service. Chris Milliken reviewed Galac-Tac in the March–April 1990 issue of Paper Mayhem magazine. He noted downsides that the game could become monotonous, combat reports could be dull, and defensive capabilities outweighed offensive, while concluding that "I have found Delta Games to be exemplary in their service and Galac-Tac to be [a] fundamentally good game." The Delta Games Gamemaster, Jon Capps, responded to the review in the same issue, agreeing with the combat report comment, and identifying that Delta Games had released a new version of the game. Phil Krauskopf reviewed the game in the January–February 1992 issue of Paper Mayhem, noting a point of attraction was the ability for ship design. He concluded that Galac-Tac was "quite an enjoyable game" stating that he did not experience the monotony noted by the previous reviewer. He also received positive feedback from other players on the game. Krauskopf thought that providing star systems with integral defenses would be an improvement and Delta Games suggested this was in the works based on player interest. Eric Carver reviewed Galac-Tac in the August 2014 to September 2015 issue of Suspense & Decision magazine. He concluded that the game had "excellent game design and execution", was "simple to learn but complex to master", and was "easy to include and involve friends" or family among other comments.

== See also ==
- List of play-by-mail games

== Bibliography ==
- Babcock, Chris (December 2013). "Diplomacy" (PDF). Suspense and Decision. No. 2. p. 16. Archived from the original (PDF) on July 4, 2021.
- Capps, John (May–June 2023). "Editorial". Suspense and Decision. No. 25. pp. 4–5.
- Carver, Eric (September 2015). "A Panda's Perspective: Galac-Tac Review" (PDF). Suspense & Decision. No. 10. playbymail.net. pp. 44–46.
- Church, Davin (August 2014). "Commands to Conquer: Understanding Combat in Galac-Tac" (PDF). Suspense & Decision. No. 10. playbymail.net. pp. 51–53.
- Church, Davin (May 2014). "Introduction to Galac-Tac" (PDF). Suspense & Decision. No. 7. Suspense-and-Decision.net. pp. 8–11.
- Church, Davin (June 2014). "Designing Ships in Galac-Tac" (PDF). Suspense & Decision. No. 8. Suspense-and-Decision.net. pp. 49–55.
- Church, Davin (October 2015). "Galac-Tac: Quick-Start Guide" (PDF). Suspense & Decision. No. 11. Suspense-and-Decision.net. pp. 88–90.
- Church, Davin (January 2017). "Galac-Tac: Turn Processing Sequence" (PDF). Suspense & Decision. No. 14. playbymail.net. pp. 18–21. Archived from the original (PDF) on January 16, 2020.
- Church, Davin (February 2017). "Galac-Tac: The GTac Assistant" (PDF). Suspense & Decision. No. 15. playbymail.net. pp. 32–36. Archived from the original (PDF) on 30 October 2020.
- Church, Davin (September 2019). ""Lightning" Galac-Tac: A Retrospective" (PDF). Suspense & Decision. No. 19. playbymail.net. p. 13.
- "Extra Charges For Galac-Tac Paper Mail Services". Talisman Games. 2021.
- Dias, Daniel A. (May–June 1984). "Featured Review: Galac-Tac". Paper Mayhem. No. 6. pp. 3–5.
- "General Announcements & News Releases". Paper Mayhem. No. 5. March–April 1984. p. 1.
- Editors (July–August 1985). "Rick Loomis on Play-By-Mail [Editor Intro]". The Space Gamer. No. 75. p. 35.
- Editors (March–April 1984). "PBM Update: Phoenix Publications". The Space Gamer. No. 68. p. 51.
- "Gameline News and Updates". Paper Mayhem. No. 6. May–June 1984. pp. 18–20.
- Harvey, Chris (Spring 1984). "The Future of PBM". Flagship. No. 2. p. 21.
- Harvey, Chris (April–May 2003). "My Life in Games" (PDF). Flagship. No. 102. p. 26.
- McLain, Bob (August 1, 1993). "Play By Mail: The Infancy of Cyberspace". Pyramid. sjgames.com.
- Milliken, Chris (March–April 1990). "A Review of Galac-Tac". Paper Mayhem. No. 41. pp. 18–22.
- Krauskpof, Phil (January–February 1992). "Galac-Tac". Paper Mayhem. No. 52. pp. 18–21.
- Popolizio, Mike; LeBlanc, Liz; Popolizio, Marti (January–February 1990). "Revamping a Classic! The Redesign of BSE". Paper Mayhem. No. 40. pp. 8–10.
- White, Genny (March 2014). "Galac-Tac Encounters of the PBM Kind: Galac-tac Returns" (PDF). Suspense & Decision. No. 5. Suspense-and-Decision.net. pp. 3–5.
- Palmer, Nicky (January 2003). "Flagship 100: A Founder's Memories" (PDF). Flagship. No. 100. p. 4.
- "TSG Surveys: Play-By-Mail Game Companies". The Space Gamer. No. 33. November 1980. p. 13.
- Talisman Games. "Galac-Tac Rule Book" (PDF). Talisman Games.
- "TSG Surveys: Play-By-Mail Game Companies". The Space Gamer. No. 33. November 1980. p. 13.
- Townsend, Jim (1988). "The PBM Corner". White Wolf Magazine. No. 11. p. 20.
- White, Genny (July 2014). "Galac-Tac Startup: Building Your Nest, or Nurturing Your Roc Eggs" (PDF). Suspense & Decision. No. 8. Suspense-and-Decision.net. pp. 8–10.
