= Mobius I =

1984 play-by-mail space combat game

- Cover art
- Designers: Dan Carver and Edward Cooper
- Publishers: Mobius Games, Flying Buffalo Inc., Rick Loomis PBM Games
- Years active: 1984 to unknown
- Genres: science fiction, play-by-mail
- Languages: English
- Players: 12
- Playing time: Fixed
- Materials required: Instructions, order sheets, turn results, paper, pencil
- Media type: Play-by-mail or email
- Website: www.rickloomispbm.com/mobius.html

Mobius I is a closed-end, space-based play-by-mail (PBM) wargame of space conquest. The game was first published in 1984 by Mobius Games and was subsequently published by Flying Buffalo, Inc. and Rick Loomis PBM Games.

Mobius I is relatively complex, with a robust ruleset. 12 players per game operate in sectors of sixty stars. Players use characters of varying types to pursue the elements of gameplay—combat, diplomacy, economics, and exploration. Those with the most victory points after gameplay—normally 25 to 35 turns, win.

== History and development ==
Mobius I is a computer-moderated, closed-end, play-by-mail game of space conquest. It is medium–hard complexity. Jeffery Hall also stated the game was complex, pointing to the robust rules and noted that "this is not a game for the casual player". In 1984, it was published by Mobius Games of Scottsdale, AZ. Dan Carver and Edward Cooper designed the game. In 1988, Flying Buffalo, Inc. was publishing the game. As of late 2021, Rick Loomis PBM Games is the publisher.

== Gameplay ==
Each game has twelve players. Each player starts with 15–25 characters. 99 characters is the maximum. Characters have jobs such as "General, Admiral, Spy, and Governor". Players have used various sources to name their characters, including phone books, friends names, fictional characters, and obituaries, among others. Naming every character "Bob" was common.

The game set comprises an area with sixty stars. For movement, players design ships using four variables: "range, fighting ability, cargo space, and cost".

The game emphasizes combat. Combat power available comprises spaceships and forces called Planetary Landing Forces (PLF). Conflict between players can involve only personnel, only ships, or a combination. Combat, diplomacy, and economics are elements of gameplay. Exploration is also an important aspect.

Players win by amassing the most victory points through acquiring planets and people. Manufacturing output also returned victory points. Turn results are sizeable. Games lasted 20–30 turns.

== Reception ==
Bob McLain, the editor of Gaming Universal, provided a strong recommendation for the game in 1984, rating it 4.5 stars out of 5, between the magazine's "excellent" and "perfect" ratings. In a 1987 issue of Flagship, Gordon Munson called it an "excellent wargame" which rose above the tactical level. He recommended the game, noting it provided excellent value for the money. In 1992, Mobius I placed 6th of 30 PBM games in its division in Flagship's Spring 1992 Game Ratings. (Note: 1st through 5th place were Andromeda Cluster, New Order, Empyrean Challenge, Maxi Challenge, and Fire in the Galaxy. Mobius I was ranked in Division II of Flagship's Computer-moderated SF Wargames category.) Jeffery Hall reviewed the game in a 1993 issue of Flying Buffalo Quarterly, opining that "Mobius is a great game and lots of fun to play".

== See also ==
- List of play-by-mail games

== Bibliography ==
- Hall, Jeffery L. (October 1993). "Mobius-I: The Good, the Bad, and the Ugly". Flying Buffalo Quarterly. No. 69. pp. 8–9.
- Munson, Gordon (Spring 1987). "Mobius I: Top-Value SF Wargaming". Flagship. No. 18. pp. 48–50.
- McLain, Bob (Summer–Fall 1984). "Gamealog: Mobius I". Gaming Universal. No. 3–4. p. 61.
- Rich, Scott; Carver, Dan (April 1988). "So Your Setup Turn for Mobius-I Just Arrived". Flying Buffalo Quarterly. No. 60. pp. 13–15.
- Sullivan, Tim (February–March 1988). "From the Helm: Mobius I". The D2 Report. No. 16. p. 30.
- Spencer, David (October 7, 2021). "PBM's Newest Company: Rick Loomis PBM Games". Suspense & Decision. Archived from the original on March 5, 2023.
- Tabor, Al (March 1992). "Flagship Ratings - Spring 1992". Flagship. No. 36. p. 39.
