= Heroic Fantasy =

Play-by-mail fantasy game

- Designers: Rick Loomis
- Publishers: Flying Buffalo Inc., Rick Loomis PBM Games
- Years active: 1982–present
- Genres: Heroic fantasy, Role-playing, play-by-mail
- Languages: English
- Players: varies
- Playing time: Months
- Materials required: Instructions, order sheets, turn results, paper, pencil
- Media type: Play-by-mail or email
- Website: http://rickloomispbm.com/

Heroic Fantasy is a computer-moderated, dungeon crawl play-by-mail game. It has been active since 1982 when it was published by Flying Buffalo. The initial edition involved nine dungeon levels. Flying Buffalo published subsequent editions due to challenging gameplay initially, eventually limiting the game to four dungeon levels with a fifth outdoors level where players can assemble an army and capture one or more castles. The game is open-ended; gameplay continues until players decide to stop.

In the game, players can create a party of up to fifteen characters within certain limits. Various races are available for characters which can be fighters or magic users, the latter having various spells at their disposal. Players can encounter non-player characters (NPCs), fight monsters for experience points, and collect treasure while their party progresses through the dungeon levels.

The game received various reviews in the 1980s, ranging from generally to very positive. In 2011, Heroic Fantasy won the Origins Award for Best Play by Mail or Correspondence Game. As of August 2021, it has been published by Rick Loomis PBM Games and is available for play by postal mail or email.

== Play-by-mail genre ==
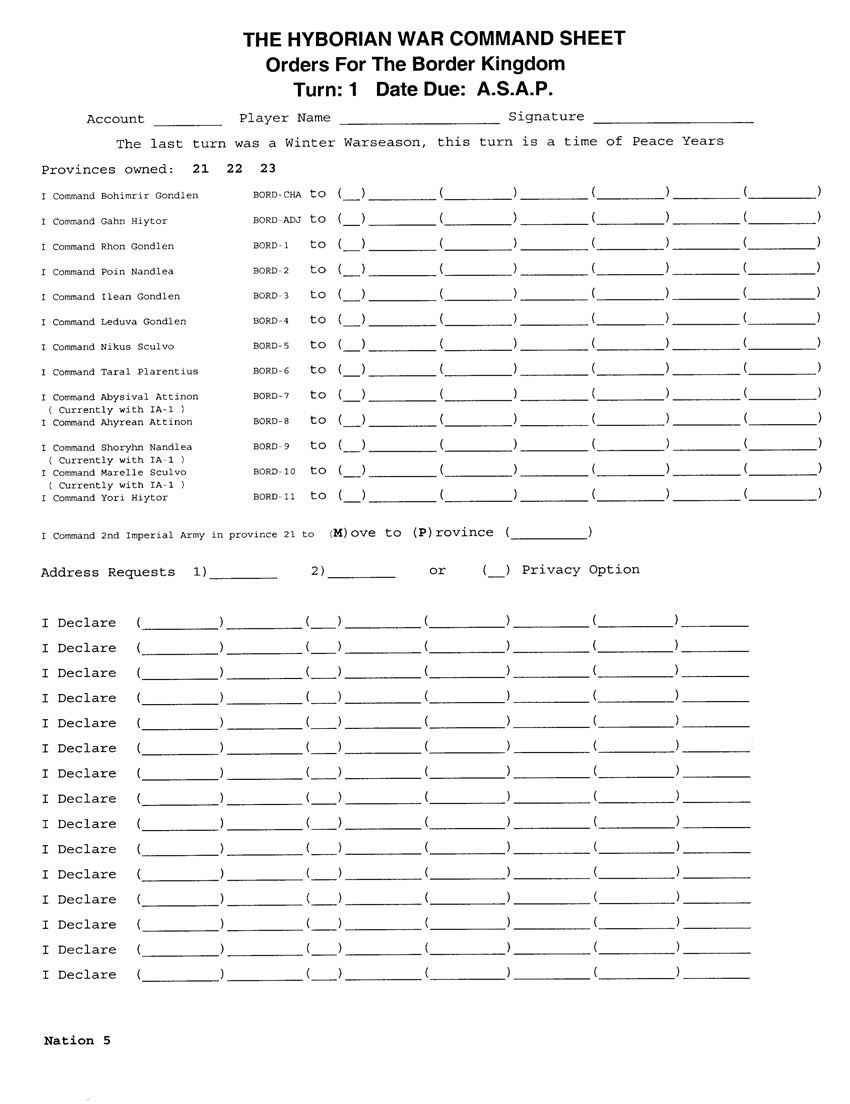
Example Hyborian War turn 1 order sheet for the Border Kingdom

Play-by-mail (PBM) games feature a number of differences from tabletop games. The typical PBM game involves many more players than an average tabletop game can support. (Note: For example, the PBM game It's a Crime can accommodate 110 players per game.) PBM game lengths are usually longer, depending on a number of factors. Turnaround time is how long a player has to prepare and submit "orders" (moves and changes to make in the game) and the company has to process them and send back turn results. The average turnaround time in the 1980s was two weeks, but some modern PBM games are play-by-email (PBEM) with shorter turnaround times of twice per week or faster. (Note: For example, the PBM game Covert Operations allows twice-per-week moves, daily moves, and private games where players can specify turn around times.) Open ended games allow players to strengthen their positions without end, with players continually entering and leaving the game. Examples include Heroic Fantasy and Monster Island. Conversely, closed end games typically have all players starting on equal terms, with rapid, intense, player vs. player gameplay that ends when a player or group achieves some victory condition or is unopposed. Examples include Hyborian War and It's a Crime. The complexity of PBM games can range from the relatively simple to the PBM game Empyrean Challenge, once described as "the most complex game system on Earth". (Note: Vern Holford, owner of Superior Simulations, developed Empyrean Challenge, a PBM game that reviewer Jim Townsend described in 1988 as "the most complex game system on Earth" with some turn results for large positions at 1,000 pages in length. According to Townsend, in those cases there was a significant investment in time to understand what happened on a turn as well as to fill out future turn orders. He said a player without a spreadsheet was "nearly doomed from the outset".)

Once a player has chosen a game and receives an initial game setup, gameplay begins. This generally involves players filling out order sheets for a game (see example image) and sending them to the gaming company. The company processes the turns and returns the results to the player, who completes a subsequent order sheet. Diplomacy is also frequently an important—sometimes indispensable—part of gameplay. The initial choice of a PBM game requires consideration as there is a wide array of possible roles to play, from pirates to space characters to "previously unknown creatures". Close identification with a role typically increases a player's game satisfaction. (Note: This section is taken from the Play-by-mail genre section of the Hyborian War Wikipedia article.)

=== History ===
The earliest play-by-mail games developed as a way for geographically separated gamers to compete with each other using postal mail. Chess and Go are among the oldest examples of this. In these two-player games, players sent moves directly to each other. Multi-player games emerged later: Diplomacy is an early example of this type, emerging in 1963, in which a central game master manages the game, receiving moves and publishing adjudications. According to Shannon Appelcline, there was some PBM play in the 1960s, but not much. For example, some wargamers began playing Stalingrad by mail in this period.

"Rick Loomis is generally recognized as the founder of the PBM industry."

— The Editors of Space Gamer Magazine, 1985.

In the early 1970s, in the United States, Rick Loomis, of Flying Buffalo Inc., began a number of multi-player play-by-mail games; these included games such as Nuclear Destruction, which launched in 1970. This began the professional PBM industry in the United States. Professional game moderation started in 1971 at Flying Buffalo which later added games such as Battleplan, Starweb, and others, which by the late 1980s were all computer moderated. (Note: John W. Kelly, Jr. and Mike Scheid also noted that Jim Dutton "decided to write a short story for each turn and the narrative game was born". Kelley and Scheid did not identify the timeframe or which company Dutton worked for.)

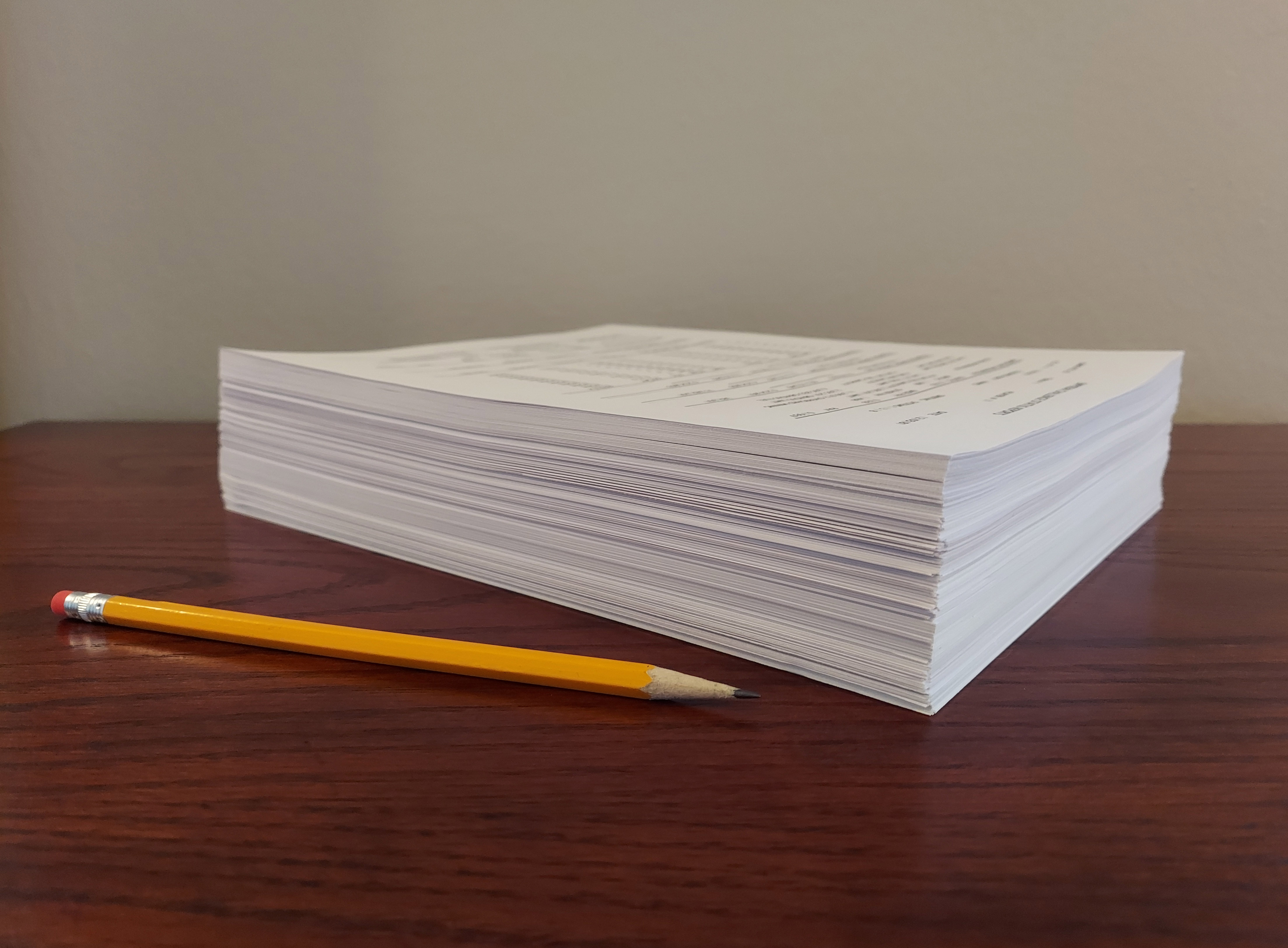
Turn results for Empyrean Challenge could be 1,000 pages in length.

For approximately five years, Flying Buffalo was the single dominant company in the US PBM industry until Schubel & Son entered the field in roughly 1976 with the human-moderated Tribes of Crane. (Note: Schubel and Son first entered the PBM field in 1974.) Schubel & Son introduced fee structure innovations which allowed players to pay for additional options or special actions outside of the rules. For players with larger bankrolls, this provided advantages and the ability to game the system. (Note: Mark Hill of Wired Magazine, stated in June 2021 that, "gamers have hated pay-to-win mechanics since the 1970s, when serious players of Tribes of Crane dropped hundreds of dollars on turns".) The next big entrant was Superior Simulations with its game Empyrean Challenge in 1978. Reviewer Jim Townsend asserted that it was "the most complex game system on Earth" with some large position turn results 1,000 pages in length.

In the early 1980s, the field of PBM players was growing. Individual PBM game moderators were plentiful in 1980. (Note: The Space Gamer's "first annual survey of play-by-mail companies" stated that "[i]ndividual [PBM] moderators are much too numerous to list".) However, the PBM industry in 1980 was still nascent: there were still only two sizable commercial PBM companies, and only a few small ones. The most popular games of 1980 were Starweb and Tribes of Crane. It was in this environment that Flying Buffalo launched Heroic Fantasy.

== Publication history ==
The game became available for play in March 1982. By November 1982, it had over 400 players. By the late 1980s, it was computer moderated. Heroic Fantasy was the third PBM game from Flying Buffalo, which the company also soon converted into a turn-based computer game available on a commercial network known as "TheSource".

"Chuck Gaydos is the first person to have a character killed. Two of his party members (Stilts and Stinky, both male fairy fighters) were killed while on scouting missions in the first turn of the game!"

— Rick Loomis, The Space Gamer magazine, June 1982.

In the 1980s, players negotiated a nine-story maze. In the 1990s, Flying Buffalo Inc. programmed two subsequent editions with the following rationale:

In the first two versions, we told the players there was going to be nine levels to the game, and the object was to go through all nine levels and exit. Players exiting from the ninth level would be given wall plaques as a prize. We never actually finished programming the lower levels, because only a couple people ever got as far as the 6th level, and after eight years only a half dozen are playing in the 5th level. We decided that maybe nine levels was too much.

The company reduced the number of dungeon levels to four, with players then exiting the dungeon to adventure in an outside environment, "recruiting an army, until you find a castle to invade". Rick Loomis described some of the changes from the first version of Heroic Fantasy in a 1990 edition of Flying Buffalo Quarterly, for example, stating that bows and crossbows had been introduced allowing players to shoot across rooms. Another addition was the "store" where players could purchase items and revive deceased characters (for a hefty price). By 1991, the first two dungeon levels of the new version were active and Flying Buffalo was playtesting Level 3 and programming Level 4.

After the August 4, 2021 sale of Flying Buffalo Inc. to Webbed Sphere, the PBM games—which were not included in the sale—continued under a new company: Rick Loomis PBM Games. The company, run by Loomis' sisters and their PBM computer expert, continues to offer Heroic Fantasy by postal mail and email as of August 2021 with one, two, and four week turn rates and a "solo" variant where one player can explore the dungeon without other player characters.

== Gameplay ==
Image of gameplay from a 1982 advertisement in Space Gamer magazine.

Heroic Fantasy is a game in which the players lead a team of fantasy characters. At the outset, players choose a party of up to fifteen characters using one hundred points, which can be used to maximize the size of the party or choose a smaller party of stronger characters. Various options are available when choosing characters including races such as dwarves, giants, fairies, leprechauns, and gremlins; and types such as magic users or fighters. There is no final object of the game or way to win; the purpose of the game is to advance by negotiating challenging mazes, defeating monsters, and collecting treasure and experience points. According to Michael A. Stackpole in 1985, the second level was very challenging while the setting for level three was outdoors with "new wanderers" and new spells. (Note: The article was originally published in Flying Buffalo Quarterly #52 -1985. An accompanying note identifies that the "article was about HF version 2, so not all the advice here still applies" (original in italics).) He noted that level four was rife with undead creatures. Of level five, Stackpole stated it was "very interesting" with new features and maps that "force characters to face danger whether they want to or not". After capturing a castle on the fifth, outside level, players can retire, defend their castle, or look for more to capture.

While negotiating mazes, players have various spells available for use, including "blast", "sleep", and "fireball". Players can find different types of treasure in the mazes, to include four types of potions: healing, strength, poison, and Stygean, the latter which adds "ten to the character's Constitution regardless of its current value". (Note: In an article originally published in 1983, Rick Loomis related how his character's constitution increased 10 points from using a Stygean Potion, indicating that the results were temporary. He noted that exiting the level would have removed the effects.) According to Jim Townsend there is also a fifth—a cloning potion—which replicates a character that is "VERY rare". Players can also find magical items such as elf cloaks, fairy rings, amulets, and Thundereggs, which have various properties and effects, as well as basic treasure such as gold rings, coins, and jewels, which provide only experience points.

While exploring mazes, players can encounter other player characters as well as monsters run by the computer, or non player characters (NPCs), with the latter being more prevalent. According to Jim Townsend, NPCs belong to clans, and actions taken against one are viewed similarly by other NPCs in the same clan (e.g., an attack against one clan NPC will cause other clan NPCs to attack a player's party on sight later).

== Reception ==
W. G. Armintrout reviewed Heroic Fantasy in the November 1982 issue of The Space Gamer. Armintrout commented that "Heroic Fantasy is a fun game of dungeon delving, and I can recommend it to anyone who enjoys the insides of underground mazes. There are a lot of options, and a lot of player-vs.-player interaction. The speech orders add a distinct role-playing dimension." In the April 1983 issue of Dragon, Michael Gray stated "This is Flying Buffalo’s science fiction play-by-mail game of conquest, trade, exploration and diplomacy. And it's nothing short of a masterpiece!"

A D Young reviewed the game in the October 1983 issue of White Dwarf, stating that "Heroic Fantasy is an excellent game for beginners. It does not involve very much diplomacy (although it can, if one runs into groups of other players), and the rescue-party rule makes it a game you can enjoy for a longtime." Graham Masters Jr. also noted the latter theme in the Sep–Oct 1982 issue of Computer Gaming World, stating that "HF allows a player whose group has been severely weakened through the death of several characters to send in a "rescue" party."

Stewart Wieck reviewed Heroic Fantasy in White Wolf #10 (1988), rating it a 3 out of 10 and stated that "Heroic Fantasy can be recommended for beginners to get a feeling for PBM gaming, but in all the game is not very satisfying."

Heroic Fantasy won the Origins Award for Best Play by Mail or Correspondence Game of 2011.

== See also ==
- Cosmic Crusaders
- List of play-by-mail games

== Bibliography ==
- Appelcline, Shannon (2011). Designers & Dragons. Mongoose Publishing. ISBN 978-1-907702-58-7.
- Armintrout, W.G. (November 1982). "The Great Buffalo Hunt: Heroic Fantasy vs. Catacombs of Chaos". The Space Gamer. No. 57. pp. 2–5.
- Babcock, Chris (December 2013). "Diplomacy" (PDF). Suspense and Decision. No. 2. p. 16. Archived from the original (PDF) on July 4, 2021.
- Crompton, Steve (August 2021). "The Big News...". Rick Loomis PBM Newsletter. No. 1. p. 1.
- DuBois, Steven (January–February 1997). "Monster Island: A Review". Paper Mayhem. No. 82. p. 4.
- Flying Buffalo Inc. (1990). "Rules for Heroic Fantasy". Flying Buffalo Inc.
- Flying Buffalo, Inc. "Covert Operations". Flying Buffalo Inc.
- "GAMA > Origins Awards > 38th Origins Awards". 13 February 2013. Archived from the original on 13 February 2013.
- "Gameline News and Updates". Paper Mayhem. No. 6. May–June 1984. pp. 18–20.
- Gray, Michael (April 1983). "The PBM scene: Facts you can use when YOU choose what game to play". Dragon. No. 72. TSR, Inc. p. 35.
- Greenberg, Andrew (May–June 1993). "PBM Corner: A Beginning in Play-By-Mail; Is it Worth It?". White Wolf Magazine. No. 36. pp. 8–9.
- Harvey, Chris (Spring 1984). "The Future of PBM". Flagship. No. 2. p. 21.
- "Heroic Fantasy". The Space Gamer. No. 53. July 1982. p. 16.
- Hill, Mark (June 20, 2021). "Remember When Multiplayer Gaming Needed Envelopes and Stamps?". Wired.
- Kelly, Jr, John W.; Scheid, Mike (May–June 1985). "Prehistoric PBM: First World in Review". Paper Mayhem. No. 12. p. 26.
- KJC Games. "It's a Crime (Rule Page)". KJC Games.
- Lindahl, Greg. "PBM / PBEM List Index: closed-ended". Play by Email (PBeM) & Play by Mail (PBM) List Index.
- Loomis, Rick (December 1990). "New Heroic Fantasy Rules & Games". Flying Buffalo Quarterly. No. 64. p. 2.
- Loomis, Rick (July 1991). "Heroic Fantasy". Flying Buffalo Quarterly. No. 65. p. 2.
- Loomis, Rick (May 1999). "Heroic Fantasy: An Article Originally Appearing in FBQ#48 dated June 1983" (PDF). Flying Buffalo Quarterly. No. 79. pp. 12–14.
- Loomis, Rick (April 1982). "Space Battle (Flying Buffalo, Inc.)". The Space Gamer. No. 50. p. 38.
- Loomis, Rick (June 1982). "PBM Update: Heroic Fantasy (Flying Buffalo, Inc.)". The Space Gamer. No. 52. p. 46.
- Loomis, Rick (November 1982). "PBM Update: Heroic Fantasy (Flying Buffalo, Inc.)". The Space Gamer. No. 57. p. 41.
- Loomis, Rick (December 2013). "Letter from Rick Loomis to the Play By Mail/Email/Web/Turn Based Games Community" (PDF). Suspense and Decision. No. 2. p. 38. Archived from the original (PDF) on July 4, 2021.
- Loth III, John Kevin (March–April 1986). "A PBM Primer". Paper Mayhem. No. 17. p. 42.
- Masters Jr., Graham (September–October 1982). "Heroic Fantasy: An Interactive Role-Playing Game or "How Revenge is Going to Be Sweet"". Computer Gaming World. Vol. 1, no. 6. pp. 11, 44.
- McLain, Bob (August 1, 1993). "Play By Mail: The Infancy of Cyberspace". Pyramid. sjgames.com.
- Moody, Loren (November–December 1986). "Heroic Fantasy". Paper Mayhem. No. 21. p. 21.
- Mouchet, Paul (February 2017). "PBM: Reducing the "Barrier to Entry"" (PDF). Suspense and Decision. No. 15. PlayByMail.net. pp. 10–12. Archived from the original (PDF) on October 30, 2020.
- "Nuclear Destruction". Flying Buffalo, Inc.
- Paper Mayhem editors (January–February 1993). "Front Matter". Paper Mayhem. No. 58. p. 1.
- Popolizio, Mike; LeBlanc, Liz; Popolizio, Marti (January–February 1990). "Revamping a Classic! The Redesign of BSE". Paper Mayhem. No. 40. pp. 8–10.
- Rodgers, Patrick (May–June 1992). "New Horizons for Heroic Fantasy". Paper Mayhem. No. 54. pp. 18–19.
- Stackpole, Michael A. (August 2021). "Surviving Heroic Fantasy: How Our Characters Live Long Enough to Playtest the Lower Levels". Rickloomis PBM. rickloomispbm.com.
- "The Flying Buffalo Press Release: Webbed Sphere, Inc. acquires long time game publisher Flying Buffalo, Inc". Flying Buffalo Inc.
- Townsend, Jim (January–February 1987). "How to Win in PBM—An Organizational Viewpoint". Paper Mayhem. No. 22. p. 29.
- Townsend, Jim (March–April 1987). "A Real Look at Heroic Fantasy". Paper Mayhem. No. 23. pp. 24–28.
- Townsend, Jim (July–August 1997). "A New Heroic Fantasy: Part I". Paper Mayhem. No. 85. pp. 4–6.
- Townsend, Jim (September–October 1997). "The New Heroic Fantasy: Part II". Paper Mayhem. No. 86. pp. 4–8.
- Townsend, Jim (1988). "The PBM Corner". White Wolf Magazine. No. 11. p. 20.
- Young, A D (October 1983). "Microview". White Dwarf. No. 46. Games Workshop. p. 29.
- "TSG Surveys: Play-By-Mail Game Companies". The Space Gamer. No. 33. November 1980. p. 13.
- "What PBM Games are We Running?". Rick Loomis PBM Newsletter. No. 1. August 2021. p. 2.
