= Space Battle (play-by-mail game) =

Space-based play-by-mail game

Space Battle is a play-by-mail game that was published by Flying Buffalo beginning in 1980.

== Gameplay ==
Space Battle was a game that involved two teams of ten players each in which one team member is the commander of a base ship and three battleships, and the other players each have one cruiser and three scouts, and one team wins when they destroy the base ship of their opposing team. The game lacked economic and exploring aspects.

== Reception ==
Sam Moorer reviewed Space Battle in The Space Gamer No. 50. Moorer commented that "Space Battle is a disappointment to Flying Buffalo's customers, who enjoyed their classic games. This one lacks the balance and fascination of StarWeb or Battle Plan. It might be interesting to a wargaming club. They could get together to discuss strategy and tactics, coordinating their movement. But the average PBMer won't find the trip worth the fare."

A reviewer in a 1983 issue of PBM Universal, suggested it needed more work and "largely fail[ed] to generate or sustain interest".

== See also ==
- List of play-by-mail games
