= The Runedice Book =

The Runedice Book is a book for Runedice published by Flying Buffalo.

== Contents ==
The Runedice Book is a supplement in which a divinatory system is provided for fortune telling.

== Publication history ==
Shannon Appelcline noted that "The Runedice Book (1993) was an odd release that combined Flying Buffalo's continued interest in weird dice with the setting of Lejenta; the guide to interpreting the dice was written by Nancy Loomis."

== Reception ==
Sam Chupp reviewed The Runedice Book in White Wolf #40 (1994), rating it a 3 out of 5 and stated that "As far as The Runedice Book's use in fantasy roleplaying goes, the system might be useful in creating storylines and/or character backgrounds. You may even want your characters to scribe the runes on parchment or engrave them on armor in order to invoke the power ascribed to them. The work is left to you, though."
