= Trajan's Treacherous Trap =

Fantasy dungeon-crawler play-by-mail game

- Designers: Rick Loomis
- Publishers: Flying Buffalo Inc., Rick Loomis PBM Games
- Years active: 1979 to circa 1988
- Genres: Heroic fantasy, play-by-mail
- Languages: English
- Players: not fixed
- Playing time: Fixed
- Materials required: Instructions, order sheets, turn results, paper, pencil
- Media type: Play-by-mail

Trajan's Treacherous Trap (or Treacherous Trajan's Trap) is a play-by-mail game that was published by Flying Buffalo in 1979.

== Development and gameplay ==
Trajan's Treacherous Trap was a fantasy role-playing game designed similarly to Flying Buffalo's dungeon adventures for solo players. The game was hand-moderated. Rick Loomis described it as a PBM version of Tunnels & Trolls. (Note: Loomis indicated this as a replacement for "the Heroic Fantasy (where 5 assorted players mail their moves to a Scottsdale dungeonmaster)".) It was a "solo dungeon by mail" with basic elements of gameplay. Orders were multiple choice and turn sheets were normally short—about a page long.

Loomis ran the games and adjudicated the turns according to Tunnels & Trolls rules. Starting players were fighters with a sword. The setting was a "devilish dungeon designed to kill 999 out of 1000 players who enter". The dungeon's exit was on the bottom of its three levels. Loomis warned that solving the dungeon would be costly and challenging, but would earn a sizable reward. (Note: Loomis stated that the first winner would win services or subscriptions worth about $100, while subsequent winners would also win a prize.) By mid-1979, Loomis stated that there were about 90 players.

Loomis wrote in the April 1982 issue of The Space Gamer that, even though "the game has been running for well over a year, no one has yet found the entrance to the second level". As of 1988, "only one person [had] ever survived the dungeon".

== Reception ==
Stefan Jones reviewed Trajan's Treacherous Trap in The Space Gamer No. 37. Jones commented that "I can't really recommend Trajan's Treacherous Trap, unless you're rich, can't find anyone to game with, and find that no one will sell you any of the numerous solo dungeons available." M.T. Lunsford reviewed the game in February–March 1988 issue of D2 Report magazine. He noted it as a simple, but slow game that the publisher was winding down.

== See also ==
- List of play-by-mail games

== Bibliography ==
- Loomis, Rick (April 1980). "Editorial". Flying Buffalo Quarterly. No. 40. pp. 1–6.
