= Feudal Lords =

Play-by-mail role-playing game

- Cover image of game.
- Designers: John Van De Graaf
- Publishers: Graaf Simulations, Flying Buffalo Inc., Rick Loomis PBM Games
- Years active: 1977 to current
- Genres: Role-playing, medieval fantasy
- Languages: English
- Players: 8–17
- Playing time: Fixed
- Materials required: Instructions, order sheets, turn results, paper, pencil
- Media type: Play-by-mail or email
- Website: http://rickloomispbm.com/

Feudal Lords is a closed-end, computer moderated, play-by-mail game set in medieval England. Starting as a game run through a magazine in 1977, it was first published by Graaf Simulations, later run by Flying Buffalo, Inc, and is today published by Rick Loomis PBM Games.

== History and development ==
John Van De Graaf created Feudal Lords in 1977 with basic gameplay, set in King Arthur times. Van de Graaf published the game in his Diplomacy magazine, updating the rules and integrating a computer in 1980. In 1982, following a playtest, he published the game through a new company, Graaf Simulations. The design comprised economic, military and diplomatic aspects.

Bill Paxton won Game #1, which ended in 1982. Flying Buffalo also ran the game. The copyright date on Flying Buffalo's rules written by John Van De Graaf is 1982. The UK company, ICBM, ran the game from 1983 to 1990, with Sloth Enterprises picking up the game in 1991. In 1984, Graaf Simulations had over 35 games running. As of October 2021, Rick Loomis PBM Games publishes the game. The game is computer-moderated.

== Gameplay ==
The game is set in medieval England after the death of King Arthur. Each player controls one of the 46 fiefs on the map of England, with non-played fiefs acting independently. Players have 32 possible orders available, but can only submit 12 per one-year turn. Other limits apply, such as one military campaign annually. According to reviewer Chris Frink, these constraints "make for a better-balanced, more interesting game". Players must manage various aspects of medieval life, including maintaining knights, peasants, and townspeople, and accounting for economic factors such as mining and agriculture. Diplomacy is critical to success; winning is not possible without alliances.

The object of the game is to gain control of 23 of the 46 feifs.

== Reviews ==
Michael Gray reviewed the game in a 1983 issue of Dragon. He gave it positive marks for the rules and the logical setup of the orders sheets. He assessed the game as "fun", stating "I heartily recommend it."

== See also ==
- List of play-by-mail games

== Bibliography ==
- Fast, Byron (Nov–Dec 1987). "The Ins and Outs of Feudal Lords". Paper Mayhem. No. 27. pp. 16–17.
- Frink, Christopher (April–May 1984). "Simply Captivating: Feudal Lords Review". Keeping Posted. Fantasy Gamer. No. 5. pp. 29–30.
- Graaf, John Van De (1982). "Feudal Lords Rules" (PDF). Flying Buffalo, Inc.
- Neal, Michael D. (Sep–Oct 2005). "Lordly Designs". Flagship. No. 115. pp. 22–23.
- "PBM Update: Graaf Simulations". Fantasy Gamer. No. 4. February–March 1984. p. 44.
- Spencer, David (October 7, 2021). "PBM's Newest Company: Rick Loomis PBM Games". Suspense & Decision. Archived from the original on October 8, 2021.
- Van de Graaf, John (November–December 1983). "The Evolution of Feudal Lords". PBM Universal. No. 1. p. 19.
