= Mage's Blood & Old Bones =

Mage's Blood & Old Bones is a 1992 novel published by Flying Buffalo.

== Contents ==
Mage's Blood & Old Bones is a novel in which an anthology of seven short stories are set in the world of Tunnels & Trolls.

== Reception ==
Christopher Earley reviewed Mage's Blood & Old Bones in White Wolf #35 (March/April, 1993), rating it a 3 out of 5 and stated that "I have no complaints with any of the authors' writing skills and the characters they brought into being were all memorable in their own ways, with a minimum of cookie-cutter templates.."

== Reviews ==
- Dragon #189 (Jan., 1993)
