= Runedice =

Runedice is a playing aid for role-playing games published by Flying Buffalo.

== Contents ==
Runedice is a set of five six-sided dice in a small tube with a rune engraved on each face of the dice.

== Publication history ==
Shannon Appelcline commented on The Runedice Book (1993) which was published for the dice, calling it "an odd release that combined Flying Buffalo's continued interest in weird dice with the setting of Lejenta; the guide to interpreting the dice was written by Nancy Loomis."

== Reception ==
Stewart Wieck reviewed Runedice in White Wolf #29 (Oct./Nov., 1991), rating it a 3 out of 5 and stated that "they're fun tools and help recall those fun gypsy days with Tarot Cards in TSR's Ravenloft."
