= Schutztruppe (board game) =

Cover art of the self-published 1st-edition

Schutztruppe, subtitled "East African Guerilla Warfare, 1914-1918", is a board wargame originally self-published by Jim Bumpas in 1975, then published by Flying Buffalo in 1978, that simulates the conflict between German Schutztruppe ("protection force", the name given to the colonial troops in German East Africa) and Allied forces during World War I.

== Background ==
During World War I in East Africa, a small force of German-African soldiers under the command of Paul von Lettow-Vorbeck successfully waged a guerilla war against much larger conventional Allied forces, thereby tying down up to 300,000 Allied soldiers who could have been used in other, more active theatres of the war. The British were never able to bring the Schutztruppe to a full-scale battle, and German forces continued active operations until after the Armistice of 11 November 1918; when word of the armistice reached East Africa several weeks later, von Lettow-Vorbeck became the last German commander of the war to surrender to Allied forces.

== Description ==
Schutztruppe is a 2-player board wargame set in East Africa. In the original self-published edition, the game starts in January 1916 and ends in November 1918; at one month per game turn, the game lasts 35 turns. In the second edition published by Flying Buffalo, the option of a longer game was added. It started in August 1914, ended in November 1918 and lasted 54 turns.

=== Components ===
The game comes in a plastic bag and contains:

- 22" x 34" black-and-white hex grid map of a section East Africa, scaled at 10 mi (16 km) per hex
- 140 die-cut counters
- 8-page rulebook
- sheet of cover art

=== Gameplay ===
If the longer scenario (1914–1918) is played, the German player always goes first. If the shorter scenario (1916–1918) is played, the Allied player goes first. Several of the rules are applied differently to German and Allied forces to differentiate between the fluid guerrilla tactics of the Germans and the more road-based tactics of the Allies. For example, all terrain costs the Germans 1 movement point, with the exception of mountains, which cost 2. In contrast, Allies must use 2 movement points to cross grasslands and 3 in mountain hexes, and movement for their motorized units is doubled in those terrains. To simulate the difficulty the British had in bringing the Germans to combat, if a British unit ends its turn adjacent to a German unit, the German unit is allowed to retreat 3 hexes before the British unit can fire.

Cover art 2nd edition published by Flying Buffalo, 1978

=== Victory conditions ===
Only the German player gains Victory Points, scoring them for every Allied Combat Point brought onto the map during the game, for cutting the Uganda Railway line, and later in the game — after July 1917 — by retreating off the south edge of the map. The German player also receives bonus points for having units north of the Rufiji-Rusha River at the end of the game. The Allied player deducts points from the German player's total by eliminating German units; there is also a large bonus deducted from the German point total if the Allied player eliminates all German units before the end of the game. At the end of the game, the German player wins if they have at least 200 Victory Points; the Allied player wins if the German player's Victory Point total is 0 or less. Anything in between these two numbers is considered a draw.

== Publication history ==
Game designer Jim Bumpas self-published Schutztruppe in 1975. Flying Buffalo revised the rules, adding an optional longer game, and published a second edition in 1978.

== Reception ==
In his 1977 book The Comprehensive Guide to Board Wargaming, Nicholas Palmer noted that in a 1976 poll of manufacturers and magazine editors, Schutztruppe had been voted one of the three best amateur games.

In Issue 23 of Moves, Richard Berg reviewed Jim Bumpas's original self-published game and found much to like, saying, "Schutztruppe is a best bet. Some hazy rules can create a few problems, but, basically, this recreation of the fascinating sideshow of WWI in East Africa is a fine simulation with solid play-interest." He concluded, "Good victory conditions and tough supply rules make this a real challenge for both players."

In Issue 30 of Phoenix, Peter Bolton and William Orr thought the quality of the Flying Buffalo components was "poor compared to Avalon Hill or SPI standards." But the biggest problem they found with the game was the rules, saying, "It is not possible to describe just how bad the rules are, errors and ambiguities being rife. One can forgive poor components as third world companies do not have the economic scale of the larger companies. But poor rules can not be forgiven." Despite those issues, they thought the design of movement, retreat and zone of control, which worked differently for both sides, admirably differentiated the German guerrilla tactics from those of the Allied regular forces. However, they believed it lacked historical accuracy, noting that there was no rule for the effect of disease on the British soldiers, and questioning the game's rate of British reinforcement arrivals. As a pure game, Bolton and Orr thought that it was "very good", but "As a [historically accurate] simulation, it is not as successful." They concluded on a positive note, writing, "As a game, it is worth the effort needed to understand the rules. This is one game that should be added to your collection."

== Awards ==
At the 1975 Charles S. Roberts Awards, Schutztruppe was a finalist for "Best Amateur Game of 1975"

== Other reviews ==
- Campaign #71 & #104
- Fire & Movement #18
- The Wargamer Vol.1 #16 & Vol. 2 #23
- Games & Puzzles #61
