= Empyrean Challenge =

Science fiction play-by-mail game

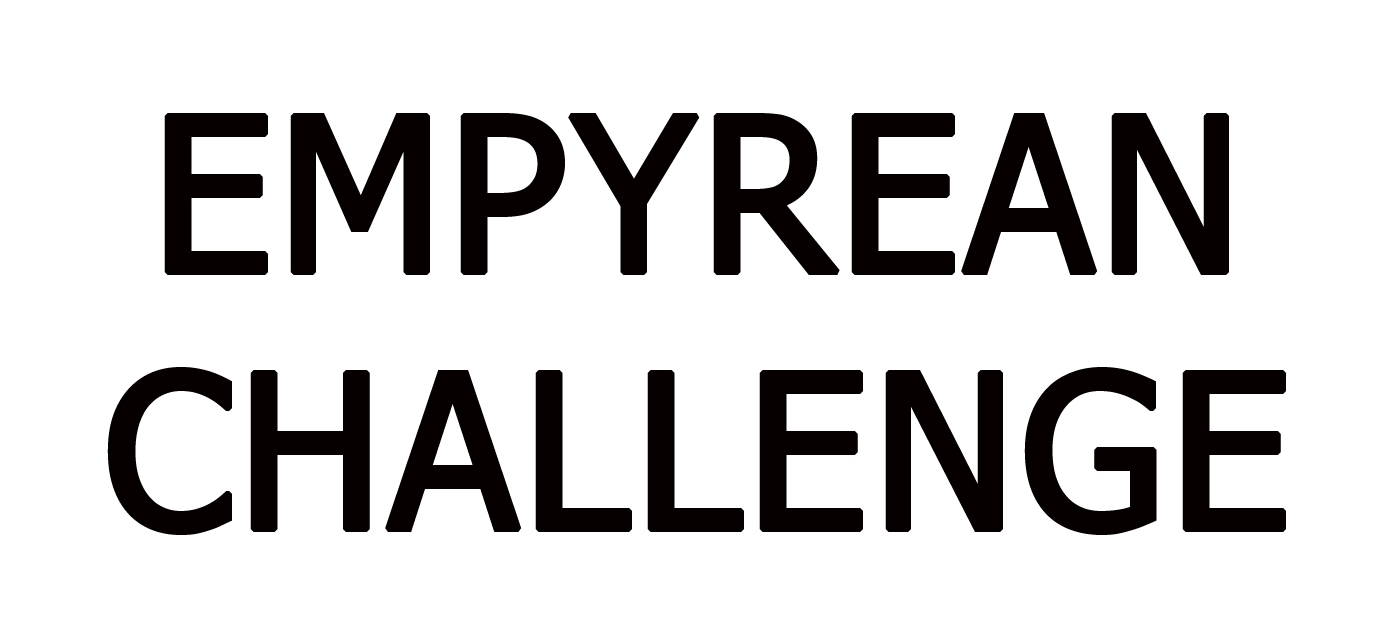
- Empyrean Challenge title image
- Publishers: Superior Simulations
- Years active: 1978–unknown
- Genres: science fiction, play-by-mail
- Languages: English
- Players: 150
- Playing time: no limit (open-ended)
- Materials required: Instructions, order sheets, turn results, paper, pencil
- Media type: play-by-mail

Empyrean Challenge is a strategic science fiction play-by-mail (PBM) game. Published by Superior Simulations in 1978, its introduction was important to the nascent PBM industry. 150 players per game strove to dominate a cluster of star systems. Diplomacy, combat, economics, technological development, colonization, and other factors were important aspects of gameplay. Detailed work was required in all aspects of the game, requiring a significant investment in time for players. Reviewer Jim Townsend stated in 1988 that Empyrean Challenge was "the most complex game system on Earth".

Various observers reviewed the game in the 1980s across gaming magazines such as Dragon, The Space Gamer, White Dwarf, and White Wolf. Commentators focused on the detail, complexity, and time required for the game, noting it was generally for more advanced players.

== Play-by-mail history ==
Some games have long been played by mail between two players, such as chess and Go. PBM play of Diplomacy—a multiplayer game—began in 1963. The emergence of the professional PBM industry occurred less than a decade later. Rick Loomis, "generally recognized as the founder of the PBM industry", accomplished this by launching Flying Buffalo Inc. and his first PBM game, Nuclear Destruction, in 1970. Professional game moderation started in 1971 at Flying Buffalo. (Note: Flying Buffalo later added games such as Battleplan and Heroic Fantasy along with Starweb and others. By the late 1980s these games were all computer moderated.) For approximately five years, Flying Buffalo was the single dominant company in the US PBM industry until Schubel & Son entered the field in about 1976 with the human-moderated Tribes of Crane. Also in 1976, Flying Buffalo launched its first space-based PBM game, Starweb. It was within this environment that Empyrean Challenge entered the PBM field. (Note: This PBM history section is taken largely from the Starweb Wikipedia article history section.)

== Development ==
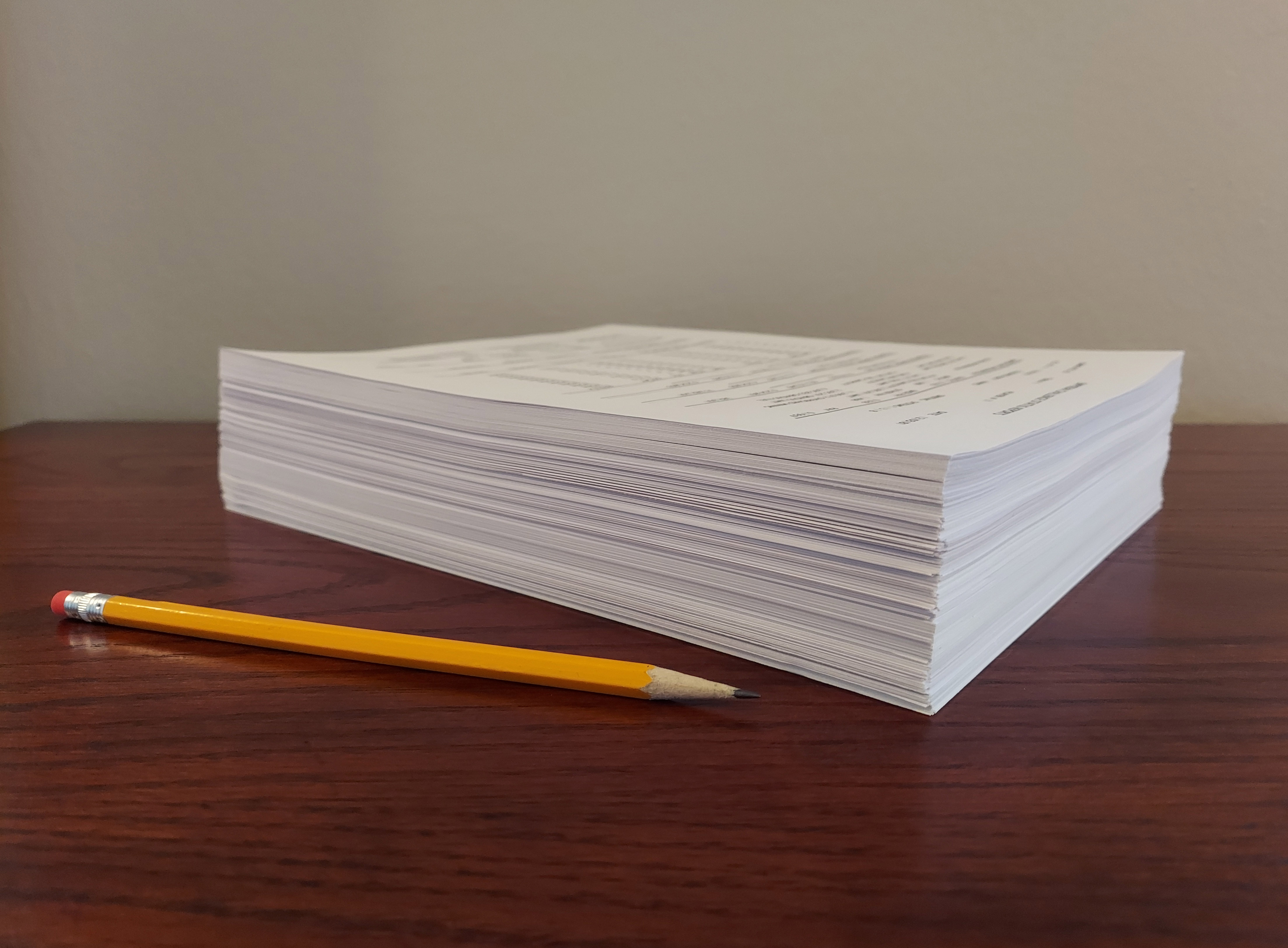
Turn results for Empyrean Challenge could be 1,000 pages in length.

According to reviewer Jim Townsend, the introduction of Empyrean Challenge in 1978 was consequential to the nascent play-by-mail (PBM) industry. In a 1980 advertisement, Superior Simulations defined Empyrean as "the highest heavens", identifying Empyrean Challenge as a strategic science fiction game. The game was developed by Superior Simulations owner Vern Holford, "an ex-Starweb player who thought he could come up with something more challenging and complex". Townsend asserted in a 1988 issue of White Wolf magazine that he succeeded, identifying Empyrean Challenge as "the most complex game system on Earth" with some large position turn results comprising 1,000 pages. According to Townsend, in those cases there was a significant investment in time to understand what happened on a turn as well as fill out future turn orders. He stated that a player without a spreadsheet was "nearly doomed from the outset".

== Gameplay ==
Start of the status reports for a player in game 5 on the first turn.

Empyrean Challenge players competed for control of 100 different star systems, with each star system consisting of up to 10 planets. The playing area was cube-shaped with sides 30 light-years in length. Within the cluster of systems were ten inhabited planets, each with fifteen player nations for a total of 150 players per game. Each of the fifteen nations on a planet comprised one of the ten races in the cluster. Players were required to employ diplomacy or combat with these adjacent nations, with diplomacy and cooperation in technology research as critical factors. Planets, populations, production factors, military units, and other elements of gameplay had various classifications or types for players to manage.

Players were required to overcome various challenges, such as economic issues and war, before developing technology to explore and colonize other star systems. Controlling about 5 of 15 colonies set the conditions for interstellar expansion. Movement between star systems was limited by technology levels—higher technology levels allowed moving more light years per turn as well as increasing the possibility of a non-catastrophic hyperjump attempt. Due to the high expense of maintaining fleets, interstellar combat was rare, but consequential.

Players could assume one of three roles. The standard position was a Ruler of a nation. Regents, who paid less, typically assumed control of colonies or ships from Rulers whose position had expanded. Independents, who paid lower per-turn fees, assumed control of weaker positions after a player dropout or colony revolt, for example. Significant detailed work was required in all aspects of the game, including the design of ships and colonies, production and technology decisions, and others. Reviewer Martin Clark called the level of detail in the game "quite staggering".

== Reception ==
"At heart, [Empyrean Challenge] is a world-economic game without undue complexity, but anyone who doesn't own a calculator is in real trouble ... for serious players only!"

— Martin Clark. Flagship, No. 1, Winter 1983.

In its 1979 Game Survey, Empyrean Challenge was rated 6.3 out of 9 by readers of The Space Gamer. David Bolduc reviewed the game in the November 1980 issue of The Space Gamer. Bolduc commented that "Empyrean Challenge is a mountain of fun to play. It is a world game – an economic game – and consumes a tremendous amount of time. [...] I recommend Empyrean Challenge for the serious game freak – particularly for the type who likes 'monster' games." In the April 1983 edition of Dragon (Issue 72), Michael Gray stated "This game seems to offer the ultimate in complex simulations, involving economic, scientific, and military decisions. If you're looking for a long, complicated game, this is the ticket." A D Young reviewed the game for the October 1983 issue of White Dwarf and stated it was "obviously only for those space gamers who wish to immerse themselves totally in the role of Ruler of the galaxy."

== See also ==
- List of play-by-mail games

== Bibliography ==
- Babcock, Chris (December 2013). "Diplomacy" (PDF). Suspense and Decision. No. 2. p. 16. Archived from the original (PDF) on July 4, 2021.
- Bolduc, David (November 1980). "Featured Review: Four PBM Space Games". The Space Gamer. No. 33. Steve Jackson Games. pp. 14–15.
- Clark, Martin (Winter 1983). "Empyrean Challenge" (PDF). Flagship. No. 1. pp. 14–15.
- "Rick Loomis on Play-By-Mail [Editor Intro]". The Space Gamer. No. #75. July–August 1985. p. 35.
- Gray, Michael (April 1983). "The PBM Scene: Facts You Can Use When YOU Choose What Game to Play". Dragon. No. 72. TSR, Inc. p. 31.
- Loomis, Rick. "History of Flying Buffalo Inc". www.flyingbuffalo.com. Archived from the original on 2008-10-22.
- Jackson, Steve (May–June 1980). "1979 Game Survey Results". The Space Gamer. No. 28. Steve Jackson Games. pp. 6–7. ISSN 0194-9977 – via Internet Archive.
- McLain, Bob (August 1, 1993). "Play By Mail: The Infancy of Cyberspace". Pyramid. sjgames.com.
- Superior Simulations. "Empyrean Challenge (Advertisement)". The Space Gamer. No. 33. Steve Jackson Games. p. 29.
- Person, Paul S. (July 1980). "Capsule Reviews". The Space Gamer. No. 29. Steve Jackson Games. p. 30.
- Townsend, Jim (1988). "The PBM Corner". White Wolf. No. 11. p. 20.
- Young, A D (October 1983). "Microview". White Dwarf. No. 46. Games Workshop. p. 29.
