= Lizards (game) =

Play-by-mail role-playing game

- Designers: Jonathan Bean
- Publishers: Roma (Aus), Circle (NZ), Flying Buffalo (US, Madhouse (UK), The Ninth Legion (UK)
- Genres: Role-playing
- Languages: English
- Players: 16
- Playing time: Fixed
- Materials required: Instructions, order sheets, turn results, paper, pencil
- Media type: Play-by-mail or email
- Synonyms: Lizards!

Lizards (or Lizards!) is a closed-end, computer moderated, play-by-mail role-playing wargame.

== History and development ==
Lizards was designed by Jonathan Bean, and published in Australia by Roma. It was also published by Circle in New Zealand and Madhouse in the United Kingdom, and Guerilleros Associes in France as of 1996. Flying Buffalo, Inc. published the game in the United States. This low-complexity game was closed-ended and computer moderated. The game's rulebook was high-quality with a color cover—unusual for a PBM game. It had humor woven throughout. In 2001, The Ninth Legion in the UK was publishing the game.

== Gameplay ==
Lizards is a wargame involving fighting clans of lizards. Players led individual clans. 16 total players vied for victory on a 32×32 hex map. Besides other players, the setting contained various living and nonliving lethal threats to players, from sea monsters to volcanoes. Five types of lizards were available for players: (1) red lizards, or troops, (2) green lizards, or farmers, (3) black lizards, or spellcasters, (4) grey lizards, or builders, and (5) spies, which could be any color.

== Reception ==
A commentator in 1996 found the game entertaining but suffered from slow clan movement rates. A reviewer in a 1996 issue of Flagship said it was "A good game", although he thought the gameplay was simple, which could appeal to some players.

== See also ==
- List of play-by-mail games

== Bibliography ==
- Cavit, Errol (May–June 1995). "Lizards Strategy Debate". Flagship. No. 55. p. 36.
- Editors (January–February 1996). "The Spokesmen Speak: France". Flagship. No. 59. p. 9.
- Editors (January–February 1996). "Rumours from the Front: Lizards". Flagship. No. 59. p. 34.
- Lamb, Greg A. (March–April 2001). "Lizards! Not as Simple as It Looks, and Always Fun". Flagship. No. 90. pp. 19–21.
- Smith, Trav (March–April 1995). "Lizards". Flagship. No. 54. pp. 21–23.
