= Galactic Conflict =

Science fiction play-by-mail game

- Galactic Conflict title image
- Designers: Chuck Gaydos
- Publishers: Flying Buffalo Inc., Rick Loomis PBM Games
- Years active: 1982; 44 years ago
- Genres: space, play-by-mail
- Languages: English
- Players: 6 to 15
- Playing time: Fixed
- Materials required: Instructions, order sheets, turn results, paper, pencil
- Media type: Play-by-mail or email
- Website: http://www.rickloomispbm.com/galactic.html

Galactic Conflict is a space-based, computer-moderated, play-by-mail game originally published by Flying Buffalo in 1982. As August 2021, Rick Loomis PBM Games took over as game publisher. During gameplay, six to fifteen players expand across the galaxy, building industrial capacity and pursuing Civilian Projects through various means. Some player diplomacy is typical. The game received multiple reviews in the early 1980s, receiving generally positive comments.

== Development ==
Rick Loomis announced the publication of Galactic Conflict in the November 1982 issue of The Space Gamer magazine. Chuck Gaydos is the designer. The game is still available for play in the 21st century. After the August 4, 2021 sale of Flying Buffalo Inc. to Webbed Sphere, the PBM games—which were not included in the sale—continued under a new company: Rick Loomis PBM Games. The company, run by Loomis' sisters and their PBM computer expert, continues to offer Galactic Conflict as of August 2021.

== Gameplay ==
Galactic Conflict is a play-by-mail computer-moderated game in which players win by having accumulated the most points when the game ends. Game lengths are fixed, with the duration determined secretly at the outset. In each game, six to fifteen players expand across the galaxy from a single planet, building industrial capacity to pursue Civilian Projects. Players can build projects, defend them, and attack other players to win them. There is some player diplomacy involved in gameplay.

== Reception ==
In the April 1983 edition of Dragon, Michael Gray stated "the player is constantly faced with the decision to build more forces and defenses or to build ECONs and thereby gain more points. This also looks like an easy game for beginners." W.G. Armintrout reviewed Galactic Conflict in the May–June 1983 issue of The Space Gamer. Armintrout commented that "Galactic Conflict is a homely but elegant game of science fiction conquest. There is a masterful blend of options in production, military campaigning and logistically structuring an empire. I give it my highest recommendation – particularly for those who have never played PBM before."

== See also ==
- List of play-by-mail games

== Bibliography ==
- Armintrout, W.G. (May–June 1983). "Star Mail: Three New PBM Space Games". The Space Gamer (63). Steve Jackson Games: 6–8.
- Crompton, Steve (August 2021). "The Big News...". Rick Loomis PBM Newsletter. No. 1. p. 1.
- Gray, Michael (April 1983). "The PBM scene: Facts you can use when YOU choose what game to play". Dragon (72). TSR, Inc.: 31.
- Loomis, Rick (November 1982). "PBM Update: Heroic Fantasy (Flying Buffalo, Inc.)". The Space Gamer. No. 57. p. 41.
- "What PBM Games are We Running?". Rick Loomis PBM Newsletter. No. 1. August 2021. p. 2.
- "The Flying Buffalo Press Release: Webbed Sphere, Inc. acquires long time game publisher Flying Buffalo, Inc". Flying Buffalo Inc.
- "Galactic Conflict". Rick Loomis PBM Games.
