= Stormhaven =

Role-playing game supplement

Stormhaven is a role-playing game supplement for Mercenaries, Spies and Private Eyes published by Flying Buffalo in 1983.

== Contents ==
Stormhaven is a setting for Mercenaries, Spies and Private Eyes that draws heavily upon pulp fiction of the 1930s and 1940s, including references to Walter B. Gibson's The Shadow, and Lester Dent's Doc Savage. The titular Stormhaven is an estate located on Savage Island off of Lake Champlain in Vermont owned by Kenneth Allard, the president of Allard Technologies, and guarded by high-tech security. Allard has invited visitors including notable people in the technology field, celebrities, and eccentric characters with connections to the family of Allard.

The supplement comes in a folder that contains an 8-page booklet of maps, and a 56-page book of scenarios and character descriptions.

== Reception ==
In the March-April 1984 edition of Space Gamer (Issue No. 68), Aaron Allston gave Stormhaven a thumbs up, saying, "I'd recommend you buy Stormhaven if you run MSPE or Espionage!, and would especially recommend it to aficionados of the hero pulps. Gamemasters of other contemporary RPGs, such as James Bond and Top Secret, should give it a look-through. It's fun."

William A. Barton reviewed Stormhaven for Different Worlds magazine and stated that "In short, I give my highest recommendations to Stormhaven for all who enjoy modern role-playing - with potential twists - and especially MS&PE fans."

In the February 1985 edition of Dragon, Arlen Walker praised the high production values, as well as artwork. Walker also liked the separate book for maps, which meant gamemasters did not have to flip back and forth between scenario description and map. Walker also complimented the character descriptions: "The major characters in this book are all completely fleshed out. They come equipped not only with complete descriptions and statistics, but each also has a reason for being on the island and a personality which will guide the character’s interaction with the player characters." Although Walker found this a very strong supplement for the MSPE system, he also thought the material could and should be easily be adapted to other modern roleplaying systems. He concluded by giving a strong recommendation: "Stormhaven gets my vote not only as the best of 1983 but also as one of the half-dozen best of all time. If you role-play in the modern era, regardless of the system, this one’s a must!"

== Awards ==
Stormhaven was awarded the Charles S. Roberts Award for "Best Roleplaying Adventure of 1983".

== Reviews ==
- Adventurers Club #3 (Spring, 1984 Digest)
