= Cosmic Crusaders =

Science fiction role-playing game

- Publisher title
- Designers: Trent Carson
- Publishers: Genesis Games Design (US)
- Years active: ~1993 to unknown
- Genres: Space tactical combat
- Languages: English
- Systems: computer-moderated
- Players: 15–20
- Playing time: Fixed
- Materials required: Instructions, order sheets, turn results, paper, pencil
- Media type: Play-by-mail

Cosmic Crusaders is a play-by-mail game (PBM) of tactical space combat that was published by Genesis Games Design beginning in 1993. The game was closed-end and computer-moderated. One reviewer described it as a science fiction analogue to Heroic Fantasy. By 1996, Madhouse was publishing the game in the United Kingdom. The game was set in a space station where players explored with customizable squads of six fighters. There were 15–20 players per game. The purpose was to find three station control keys or defeat all other squads. Various items were available to pick up during exploration and station interfaces allowed additional actions such as teleporting or healing. The game was reviewed in various gaming magazines in the 1990s, receiving generally positive reviews that noted it was simple and fun.

== History and development ==
Cosmic Crusaders was a closed-end, space-based, science fiction play-by-mail game, published by Genesis Games Design of Kenosha, Wisconsin. The game was computer-moderated. It was newly available for play in 1993. Reviewer Trey Stone thought it "a more detailed science fiction version of Heroic Fantasy". By 1996, Madhouse was publishing the game in the United Kingdom.

== Gameplay ==
Cosmic Crusaders was a game of tactical combat set in a space station using customizable squads of five personnel. 15 to 20 players per game vied for victory. The game's purpose was to "locate the three keys required to gain control of this space station". Eliminating all other teams also led to victory. Diplomacy played a minor part in gameplay.

Players could choose from four races when customizing their squads. These were Human, Paktite, Trentarian, and Urdak. They differed in speed, armor, range, and hand-to-hand combat abilities.

While moving about the space station, players could pick up various items of equipment. There were also functional medical terminals (to recharge health), teleporters, security robots, and terminals that answered questions. Characters had a scanner that allowed view of nearby rooms. Movement enabled creation of a station map.

== Reception ==
Phil Chenevert reviewed Cosmic Crusaders in the July–August 1992 issue of Paper Mayhem. He gave it a generally positive review, noting that it was inexpensive, simple, and "fun to play". He added that at the time it was not completely polished in that the publisher had made game adjustments during his gameplay.

Trey Stone reviewed the game in the March 1993 issue of Flagship. He stated that "Cosmic Crusaders is a nifty little science fiction tactical game. It isn't a deep game but an engaging little tactical challenge to play if you are looking for a fun shoot-em-up that doesn't take much time."

== See also ==
- List of play-by-mail games

== Bibliography ==
- Chenevert, Phil (July–August 1992). "Cosmic Crusaders". Paper Mayhem. No. 55. pp. 6–8.
- Dickman, Ian (1996). "Cosmic Crusaders". PBMZine. No. 4. p. 17.
- Genesis Games Design (November–December 1992). "Cosmic Crusaders [Ad]". Paper Mayhem. No. 57. p. 35.
- McMannis, Walter (January–February 1995). "The Secret of Cosmic Crusaders". Paper Mayhem. No. 70. pp. 30–31.
- Stone, Trey (March 1993). "Cosmic Crusaders". Flagship. No. 43. p. 47.
- White, Stephen R. (January–February 1996). "Rumors from the Front: Cosmic Crusaders". Flagship. No. 59. p. 37.
