= Viva!: Revolution in Mexico =

Board game

Cover art by Norm Caddo

Viva!: Revolution in Mexico is a board wargame published in 1975 by Flying Buffalo that simulates the 19th-century revolutionary years in Mexico.

== Description ==
Viva! is a 2-player board wargame in which one player controls federal Mexican forces (federales) and the other player controls opposing forces. The rule system uses a simple "I Go, You Go" alternating system of movement and combat, and deals with issues of supply with a simple "attrition" die roll each turn. Leaders play an important part of the game.

The game has three scenarios:

1. "Revolution!": A non-historic skirmish between rebels and federal soldiers.
2. "Pancho Villa!": Rebels versus federales with the addition of American General John J. Pershing
3. "French Campaign": The French invasion of Mexico involving British, Spanish and French units

== Publication history ==
Viva! was designed by Russ Beland, and was published by Flying Buffalo in 1975 with cover art by Norm Caddo.

== Reception ==
In The Guide to Simulations/Games for Education and Training, Martin Campion noted the game's focus on only combat; the political situation in Mexico plays no part in the game. Campion felt that as a result, Viva! was not a good educational tool for the classroom, saying, "It would be well to have a good game on this subject; a game like this that ignores the politics of the situation is not very valuable."

== Other reviews ==
- Strategy & Tactics #55
- Panzerfaust & Campaign #72
