= Battle Plan =

Play-by-mail wargame

- Cover image.
- Designers: Rick Loomis
- Publishers: Flying Buffalo Inc., Rick Loomis PBM Games
- Years active: 1972 to present
- Genres: Military strategy, play-by-mail
- Languages: English
- Players: 4–8
- Playing time: Fixed
- Materials required: Instructions, order sheets, turn results, paper, pencil
- Media type: Play-by-mail or email
- Website: http://rickloomispbm.com/

Battle Plan (or Battleplan) is a closed-end, military strategy, play-by-mail (PBM) wargame. It was first published by Flying Buffalo Inc. in 1972, as one of the company's game offerings after Nuclear Destruction, the game that started the PBM industry in 1970. In August 2021, Rick Loomis PBM Games began publishing the game.

To win the game, players must conquer 29 countries in Europe through the use of five types of military units or eliminate the other players. Four to eight players play the game which involves significant player interaction. Players today can play by email or postal mail. Another variant of the game is the complex World Wide Battle Plan with the same rules but encompassing a world map and up to 31 players.

== History and development ==
By 1996, Battle Plan was one of Rick Loomis's longest running games at nearly 25 years since publication. In 1996, Flying Buffalo had also run 1241 games, a significant number in the PBM field. As of December 2013, Loomis said that Flying Buffalo was still "regularly starting games" of both Battle Plan and World Wide Battle Plan.

In August 2021, on the sale of Flying Buffalo Inc., a new company, Rick Loomis PBM Games continued publication of Battle Plan.

== Gameplay ==
Battle Plan is a wargame. There are 4–8 players per game. Players have five basic units with which to attempt to conquer the 29th countries of Europe set in the "later half of the twentieth century". These units are "Armies, Navies, Air Force, Missiles, and Anti-missiles". Another way to win is to eliminate all the other players. There is a significant amount of player interaction. In the game that Lewandowski played, he indicated that the use of diplomacy was consequential for success.

Flying Buffalo ran some early European variants called Island Battle Plan and German Empire Battle Plan. (Note: The games were run "years ago" according to the 1984 bulletin.) Variations as of August 2021 include a slow version with monthly moves, a partners version where friends can play in the same game together, and a practice game.

=== World Wide Battle Plan ===
Another version of the game is World Wide Battle Plan (WWBP). This game uses the same rules but with increased capacity for "31 players all trying to gain control of 255 land and sea spaces over the entire world". In 2021, the publisher warns that the game can be complex, with "seven pages" of results every turn. Variants include a "Real Forces" version in a 1982 setting, another in a 1939 setting, anonymous and anonymous partners versions, a "Lesser Forces" version which is identical to the 1982 game except the superpowers are not played by humans, and a slow game with monthly turnarounds. According to the publisher, "World Wide Battle Plan was nominated at Origins 1988, 1989 and 1999 for best [PBM] game of the year, and won the Gamers Choice award at Gencon in 1988 for best [PBM] game. Cold War WWBP was nominated for best new [PBM] game of 1997 at Origins 1998."

== Reception ==
Reviewer Dan Lewandowski, in the September/October 1996 issue of Paper Mayhem magazine stated that, "Battle Plan is a great war game. It combines strategy and diplomacy into a simple, yet complex game." Lewandowski also agreed with Flying Buffalo Inc.'s recommendation to try this before World Wide Battle Plan.

In Issue 8 of Perfidious Albion, Andy Holt compared this game to the rival PBM game Nuclear Destruction, and called Battle Plan "a much more complex game with many more decisions to be made: the balance of production; the distribution of money; how to carry out an attack; how many spies to use, and where, etc. A very interesting game."

== See also ==
- List of play-by-mail games

== Bibliography ==
- "Battle Plan". Rick Loomis PBM Games. August 2021.
- Lewandowski, Dan (September–October 1996). "Battle Plan: A Classic PBM Game". Paper Mayhem. No. 80. pp. 13–14.
- Loomis, Rick (December 2013). "Letter from Rick Loomis to the Play By Mail/Email/Web/Turn Based Games Community" (PDF). Suspense & Decision. No. 2. p. 38.
- Spencer, David (October 7, 2021). "PBM's Newest Company: Rick Loomis PBM Games". Suspense & Decision. Archived from the original on October 8, 2021.
