= Flying Buffalo =

Role-playing game publisher

Flying Buffalo Inc.
- Type: Public company
- Industry: Role-playing game publisher, Play-by-mail game moderator
- Founded: January 1970; 56 years ago
- Headquarters: Scottsdale, Arizona, US
- Key people: Rick Loomis, Steve MacGregor, John Ward (Webbed Sphere CEO)
- Products: Tunnels & Trolls, Nuclear War
- Website: www.flyingbuffalo.com

Flying Buffalo Inc. (FBI) is a game company with a line of role playing games, card games, and other gaming materials. The company's founder, Rick Loomis, began game publishing with Nuclear Destruction, a play-by-mail game which started the professional PBM industry in the United States. Loomis added games and players while introducing computer moderation and soon incorporated into the company Flying Buffalo Inc. The company published games in other genres, including card games such as Nuclear War and a role playing game called Tunnels & Trolls, a game similar to Dungeons & Dragons. Flying Buffalo acquired its 10,000th customer account number in 1980 and reached its largest size of 21 employees in 1983.

In July 2021, Webbed Sphere bought Flying Buffalo with plans to incorporate Flying Buffalo's products. The PBM games were not included in the sale and were continued by a separate company called Rick Loomis PBM Games. In May 2023, Rebellion Unplugged acquired all of Flying Buffalo's RPG products.

== History ==
Flying Buffalo Inc. was founded in January 1970. That year, Rick Loomis invented a game called Nuclear Destruction, a play-by-mail game, for which he moderated multiplayer games. Nuclear Destruction started the professional PBM industry. He soon had more than 200 players involved across multiple games, and asked fellow soldier Steve MacGregor to write a computer program to help moderate the games; they started renting time on a computer near Fort Shafter, using the name Flying Buffalo devised by Loomis. The name came from Flying Eagle pennies and Buffalo nickels. (Note: In issue 18, Loomis related the origin story of the name: Steve [MacGregor] & I were trying to think up an original name. It isn't easy, since practically every name that has anything at all to do with wargames or simulations has been taken. We considered Simulated Simulations Inc, and Kampfkriegluftpanzerjagdblitzspiel. But they both sounded too much like other people's names, and people might get us mixed up. When we first started to rent time on a Control Data Computer in Hawaii (in 1970) the secretary asked me the name of the company to whom she should send the monthly billing. I was about to say "Richard Loomis Co", when Steve interrupted. I had once told Steve that when I got out of the Army I was going to start a stamp & coin shop which I would call "Flying Buffalo Stamps & Coins" from Flying Eagle pennies, and Buffalo Nickels. So just for a joke, we told them to send the bill to "Flying Buffalo." We put all our computer cards in a box marked "Flying Buffalo" and whenever we came to pick up the results, we would ask "Got anything for the Buffalo?" So the name stuck.)

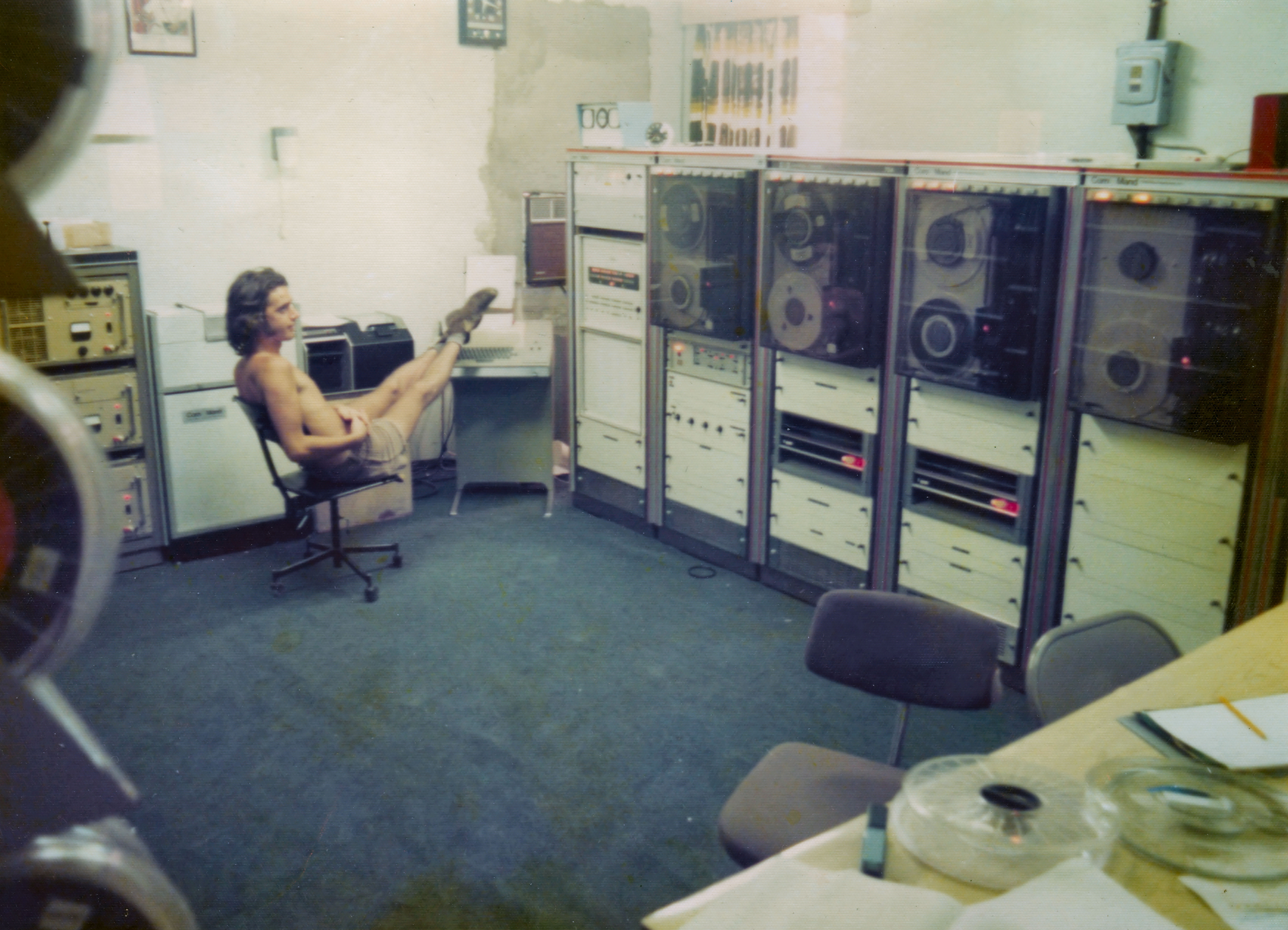
A Raytheon Data Systems 704. Used here as an onsite seismic data processing system in Mogadishu, Somalia in 1974

Loomis published the first issue of his bi-monthly magazine in September 1971—one two-sided page. (Note: Loomis said he had 150 customers at the time.) Initially called The Flying Buffalo's Favorite Magazine, Loomis eventually renamed it to Flying Buffalo Quarterly.

After leaving the military in 1972, Rick Loomis incorporated his PBM company as Flying Buffalo, Inc., or FBI. Loomis used his savings to purchase a Raytheon 704 minicomputer to run turns for the PBM games. According to Loomis in 1971, the computer cost $15,000 and had "4000 words of memory ... a teletypewriter, and a paper [tape] reader/punch".

By 1972, Loomis was running over 70 games of Nuclear Destruction, noting some game delays due to challenges with customer communications. Interest continued in Loomis's games with him stating that he was "starting many games a month", including Battle Plan. At this time, there were seven "official, licensed" Nuclear Destruction moderators outside of Flying Buffalo. Also in 1972, Loomis acquired and published Nuclear War; it soon became one of Flying Buffalo's best sellers.

By 1974, Flying Buffalo had added two PBM games—Board of Directors and Moon Base—while offering multiple other tabletop games for sale. These included Alien Space, Battle of Britain, Battle of Chickamauga, and Imperialism. In 1975 they published Tunnels & Trolls, a fantasy role playing game generally similar to Dungeons & Dragons, and Viva!: Revolution in Mexico, a board wargame. Later products included background materials for fantasy role playing games, which became the "Catalyst" series. In 1976 the company started running a space exploration/conquest PBM game titled Starweb. In 1978 they purchased a board wargame titled Schutztruppe from game designer Jim Bumpas. Also in 1978 the company began publishing Sorcerer's Apprentice. The company's gross sales in 1978 was $125,000 with expenses at $130,000. (Note: Loomis said the company had run for two years as a hobby and seven years as a business at a loss.) 1979 brought some additional changes. Flying Buffalo's Vice President, Dave Slight, died, slowing PBM operations. The company purchased another Raytheon computer from a local doctor's office, which promised to speed printing by an order of magnitude (although it initially was missing some key required equipment).

In 1980, the company stated that it had more than 3,000 players worldwide. The staff reached its largest size of over 21 employees in 1983. The company also ran a gaming store at various locations in Tempe, Arizona until 1985. In 1985, Flying Buffalo reached a milestone, assigning its 10,000th account number. The company noted that, although account No. 1 went to its founder, Rick Loomis, account No. 10,000 went to a customer from Athens, Alabama.

In 1992, the fiction book Mage's Blood and Old Bones: A Tunnels & Trolls Shared World Anthology was published by Flying Buffalo.

In July 2021, Webbed Sphere purchased Flying Buffalo Inc. Prior to the acquisition, Flying Buffalo was the oldest pen-and-paper role-playing game publisher still in operation (following the dissolution of TSR in 1997). The PBM games were not included in the sale. A separate company, Rick Loomis PBM Games, continued to run nine PBM games originally published by Flying Buffalo, including Heroic Fantasy, Nuclear Destruction, Starweb, and others.

In May 2023, Rebellion Unplugged, the role-playing game subsidiary of the video game company, Rebellion Developments, acquired all of Flying Buffalo's RPG products. The company announced its intention to continue to offer digital versions of these products, including Tunnels & Trolls. In March, 2026, Rebellion debuted a crowdfunding campaign to fund development of Tunnels & Trolls: A New Age. The campaign succeeded in their funding goals; Rebellion Unplugged announced a 2027 release for the new edition.

== Play-by-mail games ==
Flying Buffalo noted in their 14-years history to 1985, some of their PBM games had been run hundreds of times each, including over 870 games of Starweb, 930 of Battle Plan, and 720 of Nuclear Destruction. The company was also up to No. 50 in its print run of Flying Buffalo Quarterly, its company magazine. (Note: Flying Buffalo Quarterly was initially called The Flying Buffalo's Favorite Magazine from issue No. 1 to at least issue No. 36.) The company published various play-by-mail games.

- Battle Plan
- Board of Directors
- Covert Operations
- Diplomacy
- Election Year
- Feudal Lords
- Galactic Conflict
- Heroic Fantasy
- Illuminati
- Lizards!
- Mobius I
- Moon Base
- Nuclear Destruction
- Nuclear War
- Raumkrieg
- Riftlords
- Riftwars
- Space Battle
- Starlord
- Starweb
- Time Trap
- Treacherous Trajan's Trap
- World Wide Battle Plan
- 1939 World Wide Battle Plan

== Other products ==
The company produced a range of unusual dice such as Runedice, as well as a set to determine which toppings to order on pizza, and currently hold the printing rights to the Ace of Aces and Lost Worlds flip book systems.

The company also produced a beta version of a video game called Buffalo Tales.

== Awards ==
Various Flying Buffalo games have won awards.

- Ace of Aces. 1981 winner Charles Roberts/Origins Gamers Choice of 1980 and was inducted into the Adventure Gaming Hall of Fame in 1994.
- Citybook I, 1982
- Illuminati PBM game won best Play By Mail Game. 1990, 1991, 1992, 1993, 1994, and 1995 and was put in the Hall of Fame in 1997.
- Nuclear Proliferation, 1992
- Nuclear Escalation, Best Science Fiction Boardgame of 1983
- Stormhaven, Best Roleplaying Adventure of 1983
- Starweb, Best Play By Mail Game 1984, 1997, 2000, 2003, and 2006.
- Wargamers Information, 1990

The Origins Hall of Fame award is given to game designers who have the best contributions of their field. Multiple Flying Buffalo writers and designers have won this award.

- Rick Loomis, 1988.
- Michael Stackpole, 1993.
- Elizabeth T. Danforth, 1995.
- Ken St. Andre, 2018.

== See also ==
- List of play-by-mail games
