= Nuclear Destruction =

Play-by-mail nuclear war game

- Cover image.
- Designers: Rick Loomis
- Publishers: Flying Buffalo Inc.
- Publication: 1970; 56 years ago
- Genres: Role-playing
- Languages: English
- Systems: Play-by-mail
- Players: 10 to 30
- Skills: Critical thinking, diplomacy
- Website: rickloomispbm.com

Nuclear Destruction is a play-by-mail (PBM) game. It was published by Rick Loomis of Flying Buffalo Inc. in 1970. As the first professional PBM game, it started the commercial PBM industry. Offered by postal mail initially, the game is available by email as well in the 21st century. Active for 53 years, as of October 2021, Rick Loomis PBM Games publishes the game. Players use strategic missiles, factories, money, and other elements of gameplay with a focus on diplomacy to win by becoming the sole survivor.

== Development ==
Nuclear Destruction was the first game offered by Flying Buffalo Inc., and started the professional PBM industry. It was the first professional PBM game. Flying Buffalo Inc. offered the game through mail initially, but it is a play-by-email (PBEM) game in the 21st century as well. As of October 2021, Rick Loomis PBM Games publishes the game. Nuclear Destruction has been active since 1970.

== Gameplay ==
According to reviewer Charles Mosteller, editor in chief of Suspense and Decision, the modern PBM magazine, Nuclear Destruction is a "Strategic missile game with emphasis on diplomacy". The object is to be the sole survivor at the end of the game, by arranging for the other players to be destroyed with nuclear missiles. Player tools include missiles, "anti-missiles", factories, and money for influencing other players.

Flying Buffalo ran multiple versions of Nuclear Destruction. In 1973 there was a "Ladies ND" as well as a two-player version where, in the latter case, the players were USSR and China. (Note: In the May 1973 edition of The Flying Buffalo's Favorite Magazine, Loomis noted that there were four players waiting for the Ladies version to begin.) Also in 1973, groups of four to six players could play against each other in "Gang-War ND", and "Private ND" games were available for play with friends. In 1979, there was a "Partners ND" where two friends could play together; "Blitz ND", a costlier game with shorter turnaround times and priority mailing; and "Bribery ND" where players did not pay turn fees but could purchase extra resources (e.g., missiles and spies).

== Reception ==
"I fired a hundred into the air. Where were they going? I knew where. Ah, but I wasn't to last the turn, ya' see, [f]or someone fired back at me!"

— Kevin Joyce.

In Issue 9 of Command, Dennis Agosta admired Nuclear Destruction for the lack of any random factor. "It's intellect against intellect, where the outcome of the game is determined by how you and your allies (if any) make your moves." He concluded, "The excitement level of PBM Nuclear Destruction is very high, especially when the game is run on one or two week deadlines."

In Issue 8 of Perfidious Albion, Andy Holt commented, "The game is most interesting if communication is maintained with as many other players as possible, and very careful accounting kept of all information received, as with care, much of the situation can be deduced."

== Reviews ==
- Panzerfaust and Campaign #74

== See also ==
- List of play-by-mail games

== Bibliography ==
- Agosta, Dennis (September 1976). "Game Review: Nuclear Destruction". Command. No. 9.
- Lindahl, Greg. "Nuclear Destruction". PBM List.
- Loomis, Rick (May 1973). "Editorial". The Flying Buffalo's Favorite Magazine. No. 12. Flying Buffalo Inc. p. 2.
- Loomis, Rick (June 1979). "A List of the Games We Run". Flying Buffalo Quarterly. No. 39. p. 12.
- Loomis, Richard F. (1981). "Rules for Nuclear Destruction" (PDF). Rick Loomis PBM Games.
- McLain, Bob (August 1, 1993). "Play By Mail: The Infancy of Cyberspace". Pyramid. sjgames.com.
- Mosteller, Charles (June 2014). "Nuclear Destruction: ND-842/Turn # 1" (PDF). Suspense and Decision. No. 8. pp. 21–28.
- Spencer, David (October 7, 2021). "PBM's Newest Company: Rick Loomis PBM Games". Suspense & Decision.
- Townsend, Jim (1988). "The PBM Corner". White Wolf Magazine. No. 11. White Wolf Publishing. p. 20.
