= Rick Loomis =

American game designer (1946–2019)

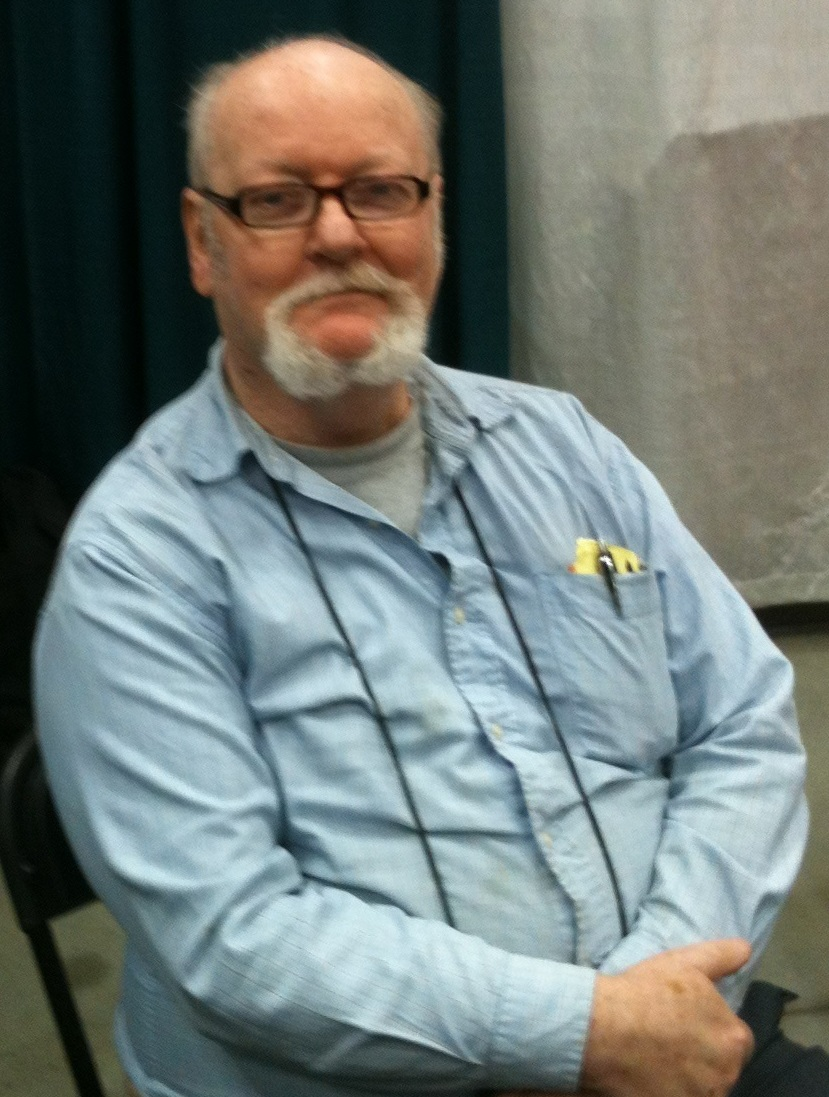
- Loomis at Gen Con Indy 2014
- Born: August 24, 1946; Scottsdale, Arizona
- Died: August 23, 2019 (aged 72)
- Occupation: Game designer

Rick Loomis (August 24, 1946 – August 23, 2019) was an American game designer, most notable as the founder of game publisher Flying Buffalo, which he managed until his death.

== Career ==
=== Early years ===
Richard F. Loomis was born and raised in Scottsdale, Arizona and attended Coronado High School. He served in the United States Army for three years starting in 1969, and was stationed at Fort Shafter in Oahu, Hawaii. He had discovered the wargame Gettysburg by Avalon Hill in a toystore, and in 1970 had invented a game called Nuclear Destruction which—unlike most tabletop games at that time—included hidden movement; in January 1970, Loomis began sending mail to readers who advertised in The General for play-by-mail (PBM) opponents, with an offer to moderate multiplayer games of Nuclear Destruction. Before long Loomis had over 200 players across multiple games, and requested fellow soldier Steve MacGregor to write a computer program to moderate these games; they started renting time on a computer near Fort Shafter, using the name Flying Buffalo devised by Loomis. In 1972, he was discharged from the Army and went to college part time, eventually earning an accounting degree from Arizona State University.

=== Founding Flying Buffalo ===
After leaving the military in 1972, Loomis and MacGregor incorporated their PBM company as Flying Buffalo, Inc., or just FBI. Loomis and MacGregor pooled their savings to purchase a Raytheon 704 minicomputer to run PBM turns. Loomis claims to have been the first person to buy a computer solely to play games on it. According to Shannon Appelcline,

The computer cost $14,000 and came with 4k of memory, a teletype input, and a tape reader and punch for mass storage. For years afterward games were saved as rolls of paper tape hung from nails on a wall.

Loomis acquired Nuclear War and began publishing it in 1972, soon becoming one of Flying Buffalo's best sellers.

Ken St. Andre asked Loomis to sell 40 copies of Tunnels & Trolls at Origins in July 1975, and when those sold out Flying Buffalo acquired the rights to the game and published their own second edition in December 1975. Loomis wrote Buffalo Castle (1976) based on a suggestion from a friend to make a dungeon adventure book that allows the player to choose an answer and turn to another page. Buffalo Castle was an introduction to Tunnels & Trolls, a basic dungeon for a warrior of level 1-2. Loomis came up with the idea for Grimtooth's Traps, which Flying Buffalo published in 1981.

"[Rick Loomis] is generally recognized as the founder of the PBM industry."

— The Editors of Space Gamer Magazine, 1985.

Loomis designed the Origins Award-winning play-by-mail game Starweb (1976). Nuclear Escalation, a card game released in 1983, had been the subject of a potential ban on all war related toys when two MPs of the UK Labour Party called the game "a nasty twist on the toy industry". Loomis was interviewed as part of this discussion saying "the game is intended to be humorous ... the subject is so serious that you have to laugh about it because otherwise you'd cry."

When the company's lease on their headquarters ran out in 1985, Loomis moved the offices of Flying Buffalo to a farmhouse he had inherited in Scottsdale, Arizona. Also in 1985, Loomis tied for first place for "Best PBM Moderator" with Mike Williams (of Rebel Enterprises) in the 1st Annual Paper Mayhem Awards in the November/December 1985 issue of Paper Mayhem.

Loomis was elected on August 19, 1978 to serve as a temporary officer for the President and Treasury of the Association of Game Manufacturers (which was renamed soon after to the Game Manufacturers Association or GAMA). He was one of the founding members of GAMA and served as its President on multiple occasions. He was one of the few remaining Emeritus Directors (alongside Will Niebling and Michael Stackpole) on the board.

In 1988, Loomis received the AAGAD Hall of Fame award at the Origins Game Fair.

=== Later years ===
Flying Buffalo published The Origins Metagame in 2002 for the Origins convention, and Loomis later created Poker decks specifically for the convention. When it was discovered that Outlaw Press, who were publishing supplements for Tunnels & Trolls, had been using art without permission, Loomis revoked their Tunnels & Trolls license.

In 2013, Flying Buffalo announced a new version of Tunnels & Trolls; the Kickstarter raised over $125,000. Loomis also wrote a new section for his solo Buffalo Castle that was added to the deluxe version of that adventure. The game had a wide release in 2015.

In 2015, Flying Buffalo announced the Kickstarter for the 50th Anniversary edition Nuclear War Card Game; the cards were updated to the full color and it included a third new population deck. The Kickstarter raised over $156,000. The edition had a wide release in 2016.

In March 2019 Flying Buffalo announced the Kickstarter for the Combined Edition of Mercenaries, Spies and Private Eyes. It combined the text of the 1983 Flying Buffalo edition with the additional text of the 1986 Sleuth edition, corrected errata, and added 20 new pages of content with new illustrations. It earned $31,904 (over a goal of $10,000) and had 886 backers.

== Health and death ==
In January 2019, Loomis was diagnosed with lymphatic cancer. In an email he said that he was very optimistic as his cancer was "very treatable". On August 17, he was moved to the intensive care unit and could not receive visitors until August 21. A GoFundMe page and a Bundle of Holding offer (Catalyst 2019) were set up to solicit donations for his medical bills. On August 23, 2019, a day before his 73rd birthday, he died of medical complications.

== Bibliography ==
- Loomis, Rick (May 1999). "The History of Play-by-Mail and Flying Buffalo" (PDF). Flying Buffalo Quarterly. No. 79. pp. 2–5. Archived from the original (PDF) on June 10, 2021.Provides details on Loomis's military service and transition founding Flying Buffalo Inc..
