= Crack of Doom (game) =

Play-by-mail role-playing game

- Publishers: Advanced Gaming Enterprises, Phildee Enterprises, Harlequin Games
- Years active: 1986 to 2002 or later
- Genres: Role-playing
- Languages: English
- Players: unlimited
- Playing time: unlimited
- Materials required: Instructions, order sheets, turn results, paper, pencil
- Media type: Play-by-mail or email
- Synonyms: COD I, COD II

Crack of Doom is an open-ended, mixed-moderated, play-by-mail game. It was designed and first published as Crack of Doom (or Crack of Doom I) by Duane Wilcoxson and Debbie Leonard of Advanced Gaming Enterprises in 1986. They published Crack of Doom II in 1997 which ran alongside the first version. By 1997, Crack of Doom II was running under license in the United Kingdom, first under Phildee Enterprises and later under Harlequin Games. These were fantasy role-playing games, comparable in gameplay to Advanced Dungeons & Dragons. The games were reviewed in various gaming magazines in the 1980s, 1990s, and 2000s, receiving generally positive reviews.

== History and development ==
Crack of Doom was an open-ended, mixed-moderated, fantasy role-playing PBM game. (Note: Reviewer Earl Oehm stated that both games were "about 90% human moderated".) It was published by Advanced Gaming Enterprises, run by Duane Wilcoxson and Debbie Leonard—former employees of Schubel & Son. (Note: Wilcoxson and Leonard started Advanced Gaming Enterprises in 1986.)

The company first published Crack of Doom 1 (COD I) in 1986. The September 1997 issue of The Play-By-Mail Report, stated that Advanced Gaming Enterprises was launching Crack of Doom II (COD II) after a seven-month playtest. The publisher developed the second version, in part, from player feedback. COD II was larger and provided more details and options for players. Advanced Gaming Enterprises published a newsletter for Crack of Doom called The Cosmic Balance. By 1997, Phildee Enterprises was running the game under license in the United Kingdom, with adjustments that "increased the role-playing and interaction". By 1999, Phildee closed their game and Harlequin Games began publishing Crack of Doom II.

== Gameplay ==
Crack of Doom is a fantasy PBM game. Reviewer Earl H. Oehm compared it to Advanced Dungeons & Dragons. Both games employ maps with various terrain types, with the COD II map slightly larger.

=== Crack of Doom I ===
COD I occurs in the land of Panagea. Players choose from various races: Dwarves, Elves, Giants, Goblins, Gnolls, Humans, Kobolds, Lizara, Ogres, and Orcs. Characters could be Clerics, Sorcerers, or Warlords.

=== Crack of Doom II ===
COD II occurs in the land of Lorasia. It adds additional races options including Centaurs, Dark Elves, Halflings, Hobgoblins, Leomen, Minotaurs, Satyrs, Titans, Trolls and Vampires. Additional available character classes were Druids, Seers, Squires, and Battle Mages.

== Reception ==
Earl H. Oehm reviewed the games in the September–October 1997 issue of Paper Mayhem, stating that they "are the most intricate and detailed games I have played or even heard of. The possibilities are endless in both games." Malcolm Driskill reviewed the game in the March–April 1998 issue of Paper Mayhem. He stated that, "Whatever your fantasy roleplaying interests, give COD II a try. I think you'll enjoy it." In the January–February 1988 issue of Paper Mayhem, Crack of Doom II ranked No. 9 of 62 games in its PBM Game Ratings, with Crack of Doom I ranking No. 33. (Note: The top eight games were Middle-Earth PBM, Conquest, North Island Campaign (Legends), Adventurers Guild, Victory! The Battle for Europe, Stellar Warlords, Swords of Pelarn (Legends), and Atlantrix.) The editors of Flagship reviewed the game in the November–December 1997 issue of Flagship, stating that it "looks like a challenging game, with plenty of scope for discovery and plenty of decisions to make. If you enjoy long-running campaigns, give Crack of Doom II a try!"

== See also ==
- Advanced Dungeons & Dragons
- List of play-by-mail games

== Bibliography ==
- Ames, David (January–February 1999). "Crack of Doom II". Flagship. No. 77. pp. 6, 8.
- Driskill, Malcolm (March–April 1998). "Crack Of Doom II". Paper Mayhem. No. 89. pp. 28–30.
- Kelly, John (July–August 1987). "Crack of Doom: Strategy for Success". Paper Mayhem. No. 25. p. 37.
- Oehm, Earl H. (September–October 1997). "Crack of Doom I & II – Why Play and Which One!". Paper Mayhem. No. 86. pp. 10–11.
- Editors (September 1997). "AGE Announces Release of Crack of Doom II". The Play-By-Mail Report. No. 1. p. 5.
- Editors (January–February 1998). "PBM Game Ratings as of 4/15/98". Paper Mayhem. No. 88. p. 23.
- Editors (November–December 1997). "The Spokesmen Speak: World Games: Crack of Doom II". Flagship. No. 70. p. 7.
- Editors (April–May 2002). "Harlequin's 'Other' Games: Crack of Doom, Exile, Legends, StarQuest". Flagship. No. 96. pp. 8–10.
