= Stand and Deliver (game) =

Play-by-mail Western role-playing game

- Publishers: Stand and Deliver (US)
- Years active: 1992 to unknown
- Genres: Western, role-playing
- Languages: English
- Systems: computer-moderated
- Playing time: unlimited
- Materials required: Instructions, order sheets, turn results, paper, pencil
- Media type: Play-by-mail or email
- Synonyms: Stand & Deliver

Stand and Deliver (also Stand & Deliver) is a computer-moderated, open-ended, play-by-mail (PBM) western role-playing game. This low to medium complexity game was launched in early 1992 and set in the American West. Players had over sixty orders available for their three characters related to the western genre. Exploration, diplomacy, and combat were aspects of gameplay. It received positive reviews in various gaming magazines in the 1990s.

== History and development ==
Stand and Deliver was an open-ended western PBM game published by Stand and Deliver of New York, NY. It was low to medium complexity. It launched in early 1992 with Frank Pompillo as the gamemaster.

== Gameplay ==
Players had over sixty orders available. The game included many elements of the western genre such as "gunfights, ranches, mines, claim-jumping, bushwhacking, gambling, buffalo, Indians, gatling guns, war wagons, [and] bounty hunters". Players roleplayed three characters, each with attributes such as Charisma, Intelligence, Speed, Endurance, and Health. Available professions were "Gunfighter, Gambler, Mountain Man, Travlin' Salesman, Cattleman, Sheepman, Bandit, and Prospector", each of which influenced gameplay. Although it was "not a combat-oriented game", players could partake in Bar Room Brawls, Bushwhacking, Ambushes, Shootouts, and Gunfights. Exploration and economics were also aspects of gameplay. The opportunity for diplomacy was high.

== Reception ==
In PBM Game Ratings in the September–October 1992 issue of Paper Mayhem, Stand and Deliver tied for 12th place with 7.528 of a possible 9 points. (Note: The games placing above Stand and Deliver were Star Quest, Adventurers Guild, Middle-Earth PBM, Victory! The Battle for Europe, Quest of the Great Jewels, Sovereignty, Fire in the Galaxy, Modern World Conquest, World Conquest, Supernova II, and The Next Empire, with New Order as the other 12th place game.) Mark Macagnone reviewed the game in the January–February 1993 issue of Paper Mayhem, giving the game 4.5 stars (out of 5) for the Rule Book, and 5 stars for the Fun Index, Gamemaster, Price, and for the game overall. Patrick Rodgers reviewed the game in the September 1993 issue of Shadis, stating that it was the "best open-ended game I've ever played".

== See also ==
- List of play-by-mail games

== Bibliography ==
- Rodgers, Patrick M. (September–October 1992). "Review: Does S&D Deliver?". Paper Mayhem. No. 11. pp. 50, 51.
- Editors (September–October 1992). "PBM Game Ratings as of 07-20-92". Paper Mayhem. No. 11. pp. 52–53.
- Macagnone, Mark (January–February 1993). "Stand & Deliver: A Review". Paper Mayhem. No. 58. pp. 4, 6–7.
- Rodgers, Patrick M. (September 1993). "My Name Ain't Pard: A Review of the Old West Play-by-Mail Game Stand and Deliver". Shadis. No. 9. pp. 50–52.
