= 2010 Origins Award winners =

The following are the winners of the 37th annual (2010) Origins Award, presented at Origins 2011:

Category	Winner	Company	Designer(s)
Best Roleplaying Game	The Dresden Files Roleplaying Game, Volume One: Your Story	Evil Hat Productions	Leonard Balsera, Jim Butcher, Genevieve Cogman, Robert Donoghue, Fred Hicks, Kenneth Hite, Ryan Macklin, Chad Underkoffler, Clark Valentine
Best Roleplaying Game Supplement	The Dresden Files RPG, Volume Two: Our World	Evil Hat Productions	Leonard Balsera, Jim Butcher, Genevieve Cogman, Robert Donoghue, Fred Hicks, Kenneth Hite, Ryan Macklin, Chad Underkoffler, Clark Valentine
Best Board Game	Castle Ravenloft	Wizards of the Coast	Bill Slavicsek, Mike Mearls
Best Traditional Card Game	Back to the Future: The Card Game	Looney Labs, Inc.	Andrew Looney
Best Family, Party or Children's Game	Zombie Dice	Steve Jackson Games	Steve Jackson
Best Gaming Accessory	Cthulhu Dice Bag	Steve Jackson Games	Steve Jackson
Best Miniatures Rules	DC HeroClix: Blackest Night Starter Game	WizKids/NECA	Eric Engelhard, Jake Theis, Norman Barth, Drew Nolosco
Best Historical Board Game	Catan Histories - Settlers of America: Trails to Rails	Mayfair Games	Klaus Teuber
Best Game-Related Publication	Shadowrun: Spells and Chrome	Catalyst Game Labs	John Helfers
Best Play-by-Mail/Play-by-Email	The One Ring (A Legends Module)	Harlequin Games	Sam Roads and Klaus Bachler

== Hall of Fame ==
- Alex Randolph
- TwixT
- Erick Wujcik
- Amber Diceless Roleplaying
- Sid Sackson
- Acquire
