= Spiral Arm (game) =

1985 play-by-mail space combat game

- Title image by Graaf Simulations
- Other names: Spiral Arm I, Spiral Arm II
- Designers: Australian Wizard
- Publishers: Australian Wizard (AUS), Graaf Simulations (U.S.), Sloth Enterprises (U.S.), Spellbinder Games (UK), PBM Studio (Germany), The Games Collection (Netherlands)
- Years active: 1984 to 2002 or later
- Genres: science fiction, play-by-mail
- Languages: English
- Systems: computer-moderated
- Players: 12
- Playing time: Fixed
- Materials required: Instructions, order sheets, turn results, paper, pencil
- Media type: Play-by-mail or email

Spiral Arm (also Spiral Arm I or Spiral Arm II) is a closed-end, computer-moderated, space-based play-by-mail (PBM) game. Designed in 1983 and launched afterward by Kevin Flynn of Australian Wizard, the game was also offered for play by Graaf Simulations in the United States and Canada and Spellbinder Games in the United Kingdom. 50 positions, one run by computer, began in a spiral-shaped galaxy with up to 49 players per game vying for control of more than half of the galaxy's industrial wealth. Combat, economics, diplomacy, and technological advancement were elements of gameplay. The game received generally positive reviews in Flagship in the 1980s. Over time, publishers began running an improved Version II which outscored Version I in the 1989 Flagship Ratings.

== History and development ==
Kevin Flynn of Australia designed the game after its conceptual beginnings in 1983. Flynn launched the game about six months later, with the aid of programmer Graham Rawlings—through his new company, Australian Wizard. According to Flynn, Spiral Arm drew from the games Imperium and Reach for the Stars as well as science fiction literature.

The editors of Flagship announced Spiral Arm as a new game in its Winter 1984 issue. Game No. 2 began at the end of 1985. The original game was Version I. By 1986, there were three games running, all Version II. The difference between versions centered around mitigating issues of conquest of populated worlds. Additionally, Sloth Games had modified the game from the original version. The game was also offered by Graaf Simulations. In the United Kingdom, it was run by Spellbinder Games. By 1996, PBM Games of Karlsruhe, Germany and The Game Collection in the Netherlands was offering the game for play. As of 2002, Flagship still included Spiral Arm in its Galactic View list of published games. (Note: The only listed publisher in this issue was the PBM Studio of Germany. The game does not appear in the next few subsequent issues of Flagship.)

== Gameplay ==
Spiral Arm is a closed-end, play-by-mail game. The game was computer-moderated. 50 positions are available at the start, with 49 player positions and the last run by computer. Players start in a homeworld in a spiral-shaped galaxy with 658 numbered stars. A player wins after "controlling over 50% of the industrial wealth of the galaxy". Combat, economics, diplomacy, and technological advancement were elements of gameplay.

== Reception ==
Lee Simpson reviewed the game in the Spring 1986 issue of Flagship. He thought that the game would "be about for a long time and I would recommend to anyone who enjoys a good wargame which will tax their organisational, military and diplomatic skills". Nicky Palmer, editor of Flagship reviewed the game in a 1988 issue. He stated that, "Overall, Spiral Arm remains a neatly packaged, easy-to-play space drama of low-to-moderate complexity. It's one of the only two games which I'm playing more than one of: orders don't take more than an hour to do, and even if Spiral Arm isn't the deepest game in the world it offers cheap, agreeable thrills, with a little more depth than is immediately apparent."

In the August 1988 issue of Flagship, the game scored No. 1 in the Computer-Moderated Science Fiction Games category with 8.1 out of 10 points. (Note: Other games in this category below Spiral Arms were: Ad Astra, Starweb, Empyrean Challenge, The Weapon, Warp Force Empires, Maxi-Challenge, Takamo, Fleet Maneuvers, Capitol, Magic, Return from Sirius, Galactic Conflict, Xenophobe, Starlord, and others.) In the 1989 list of Flagship Ratings, Spiral Arm II was ranked second in the Computer-Moderated Science Fiction category (behind Space Combat) with 8.8 of 9 points, while Spiral Arm I was ranked second to last place at No. 22 with 6 of 10 points.

== See also ==
- List of play-by-mail games

== Bibliography ==
- Editors (Winter 1984). "The Spokesmen Speak". Flagship. No. 5 (U.S. ed.). pp. 40–41.
- Editors (1988). "Flagship Ratings: August 1988 Award Winners". Flagship. No. 19 (U.S. ed.). pp. 42–43.
- Editors (1989). "Flagship Ratings". Flagship. No. 24 (U.S. ed.). pp. 14–15.
- Editors (April 1996). "Galactic View". Flagship. No. 60 (U.S. ed.). p. 44.
- Editors (April–May 2002). "Galactic View". Flagship. No. 96 (U.S. ed.). p. 43.
- Nixon, Wilfred L. (August 1988). "Spiral Arms Diary". Flagship. No. 19 (U.S. ed.). pp. 40–41.
- Palmer, Nicky (August 1988). "A Galaxy of Spiral Arms". Flagship. No. 19 (U.S. ed.). p. 41.
- Simpson, Lee (Spring 1986). "Mobius I". Flagship. No. 10 (U.S. ed.). pp. 12–14.
- Tindall, John (May 1990). "An Australian Legend: Kevin Flynn". Flagship. No. 26 (U.S. ed.). pp. 50–51.
