= Adventurers Guild =

Play-by-mail individual combat game

- Other names: Adventurer's Guild
- Designers: Hugh Bayer
- Publishers: Entertainment Plus More, Inc.
- Years active: 1990 to unknown
- Genres: role-playing
- Languages: English
- Systems: computer-moderated
- Playing time: fixed
- Materials required: Instructions, order sheets, turn results, paper, pencil
- Media type: Play-by-mail

Adventurers Guild was a closed-end, computer-moderated, role-playing play-by-mail (PBM) game. It was available as early as mid-1990 by the publisher, Entertainment Plus More, Inc. Multiple reviewers thought it similar to the PBM game Duelmasters (Duel2 as of 2023), while reviewer Gordon Blair thought it better than similar games. The game received various reviews in gaming magazines in the 1990s, ranging from poor to positive.

== History and development ==
Adventurer's Guild was a fantasy PBM role-playing game. It was published by Entertainment Plus More, Inc. The game was closed-end and computer-moderated. The publisher announced it available for play as early as the March–April 1990 issue of Paper Mayhem. Reviewer Marc Macagnone thought the game nearly identical to Reality Simulation Inc's Duelmasters PBM game. Gordon Blair compared the game to Duelmasters, Legends, and Middle Earth PBM. Reviewer Spike Y Jones felt that a key difference between Adventurer's Guild and Duelmasters was that the former provided the player control over character creation while the latter provided a "prerolled" character, allowing some modifications. Jones also pointed to combat strategy, turn formatting, and other differences between the games.

By 1996 there were more than 450 players throughout the world.

== Gameplay ==
Players trained their characters at the Guild before adventuring. Character traits were chosen for sex, race, and height, as well as considerations for handedness, "original abilities" (strength, dexterity, stamina, and cunning), and weapons training. Available races included elf, goblin, halfling, half-troll, lizardmen, minotaur, and ogre, among others. Players customized their characters with an initial allocation of points for weapons and traits—strength, dexterity, stamina, and cunning—which affect gameplay.

== Reception ==
Reviewer Mark Macagnone in 1990 did not have a positive view of the game, giving it one or two stars. Reviewer Spike Y Jones had a more positive view of the game in 1991, noting it as one potentially worth a try. In 1995, Brian Kellner wrote a positive review in Paper Mayhem, describing the game as "well thought out", with only a "minor complaint" about rulebook organization. Gordon Blair reviewed the game in the July–August 1996 issue of Paper Mayhem, rating it a 9 out of a possible 10 points.

In the November–December 1990 issue of Paper Mayhem, the game placed No. 10 in the Best PBM Games of 1990 list along with Fleet Maneuvers and Starweb. In the January–February 1992 issue of Paper Mayhem, Adventurer's Guild ranked No. 1 of 70 PBM games as rated by players with 8.163 points out of 9. (Note: The remainder of the top ten ranked games were: Victory! The Battle for Europe (No. 2); Adventurer Kings (No. 3); World War IV (No. 4); Sovereignty and Fire in the Galaxy (tied for Nos. 5–6); Supernova II (No. 7), The Next Empire (No. 8), Modern World Conquest (No. 9), and Out Time Days (No. 10).)

== See also ==
- List of play-by-mail games

== Bibliography ==
- "Adventurers Guild". PBM List. Play by Email (PBeM) & Play by Mail (PBM) List Index.
- Editors (November–December 1990). "Best PBM Game of 1990". Paper Mayhem. No. 45. p. 2.
- Editors (January–February 1992). "PBM Game Ratings as of 11-24-91". Paper Mayhem. No. 52. p. 46.
- Entertainment Plus More, Inc. (March–April 1990). "Gameline: Adventurer's Guild". Paper Mayhem. No. 41. pp. 31–32.
- Blair, Gordon (July–August 1996). "Adventurer's Guild". Paper Mayhem. No. 79. pp. 8–12.
- Kellner, Brian (May–June 1995). "Adventurer's Guild From Character Creation to First Adventure". Paper Mayhem. No. 72. pp. 4–7.
- Mark, Macagnone (November–December 1990). "Adventurer's Guild: A Review". Paper Mayhem. No. 45. pp. 9–10.
- Jones, Spike Y. (January–February 1991). "Adventurer's Guild: Another Look". Paper Mayhem. No. 46. p. 13.
