= 2004 Origins Award winners =

The following are the winners of the 31st annual Origins Award, held in 2005:

== Best of Class Awards ==
Category	Winner	Company
Best Play-By-Mail Game	Fall of Rome	Enlightened Age Entertainment
Best Historical Board Game	Sword of Rome	GMT Games
Best Historical Miniatures Line	WWI: Western Front 28 mm	Brigade Games
Best Historical Miniatures Game	Dawn of the Rising Sun: The Russo Japanese War 1904-1905	Clash of Arms Games
Best Board Game	Ticket to Ride	Days of Wonder
Best Miniatures Game	Attack Vector: Tactical	Ad Astra Games
Best Miniatures Line	Elmore Dragons	Dark Sword Miniatures, Inc.
Best Collectible Card Game	Seven Masters Vs. The Underworld	Z-Man Games
Best Traditional Card Game	Cthulhu 500	Atlas Games
Best Role Playing Game	Ars Magica: 5th Edition	Atlas Games
Best Role Playing Game Supplement	Eberron Campaign Setting	Wizards of the Coast
Best Fiction Publication	Path of the Bold	Guardians of Order
Best Non Fiction Publication	Pyramid Magazine	Steve Jackson Games
Best Game Accessory	Cardboard Heroes Castles	Steve Jackson Games

== Vanguard Awards ==
- All Wound Up (Twilight Creations, Inc.)
- Flames of War (Battlefront)
- Fire as She Bears! 2.1 (Starboard Tack Press)
- Pirates of the Spanish Main (WizKids, Inc.)

== Gamers' Choice Awards ==
- Legends (PBM) (Harlequin Games)
- Desert Rats – British in the Desert (Battlefront)
- Axis and Allies D-Day (Avalon Hill)
- Babylon 5: A Call to Arms (game) (Mongoose Publishing)
- VS System, Marvel Origins and X-Men VS The Brotherhood (The Upper Deck Entertainment)
- Cthulhu 500 (Atlas Games)
- The World of Darkness: Storytelling System Rulebook (White Wolf, Inc.)
- Betrayal at House on the Hill (Avalon Hill)

== Hall of Fame inductees ==
- Duke Seifried
- Tom Shaw
