= Ad Astra =

Ad astra is a Latin phrase meaning "to the stars".

Ad astra may refer to:

== General ==
- Ad Astra (journal), undergraduate journal of Roosevelt Academy
- Ad Astra (convention), Toronto literary science fiction convention
- Ad Astra (magazine), official publication of the National Space Society
- Ad Astra (play-by-mail game), science fiction play-by-mail game
- Ad Astra Ice Cap, Nunavut, Canada
- Ad Astra Ice Cap (Greenland), Queen Louise Land, NE Greenland
- "Ad Astra", a videogame released by Gargoyle Games in 1984

== Companies ==
- Ad Astra Rocket Company, a U.S. corporation founded by former NASA astronaut Franklin Chang-Diaz
- Ad Astra Aero, precursor of the now-defunct airline Swissair
- Ad Astra Games, a game publisher

== Literature and art ==
- Ad Astra (sculpture), a large sculpture at the entrance to the National Air and Space Museum
- "Ad Astra", a short story by William Faulkner
- "Ad Astra", a short story by Harry Harrison
- Ad Astra, a painting by Akseli Gallen-Kallela

== Film ==
- Ad Astra (film), a 2019 American science fiction thriller film

== Music ==
- "Ad Astra", a song by the band Deerhunter, from the album Fading Frontier
- "Ad Astra", a song by the band Arcturus, from the album La Masquerade Infernale
- "All the Works of Nature Which Adorn the World - Ad Astra", a song by the band Nightwish, from the album Human. :II: Nature.
- Ad Astra, an album and a song by the band Spiritual Beggars
- Ad Astra (album), an album by Ash, and its title track
- "Ad Astra", a song by the band Starset, from the album Silos

== See also ==
- Adastra (disambiguation)
- Per aspera ad astra, a related Latin phrase
- Per ardua ad astra, another similar Latin phrase
