= The Orion Nebula =

1990s play-by-mail space opera

- Publishers: Orpheus Publishing Corporation
- Years active: January 1990 to April 1991
- Genres: Role-playing, science fiction, space opera
- Languages: English
- Players: unlimited
- Playing time: unlimited
- Materials required: Instructions, order sheets, turn results, paper, pencil
- Media type: Play-by-mail

The Orion Nebula is an open-end, mixed-moderated, play-by-mail (PBM) space opera. It was published by the Orpheus Publishing Corporation in January 1990 after playtesting. The game was playable by postal mail, email, and CompuServe. The game was a space opera on a massive intergalactic scale. Exploration, economics and combat were elements of gameplay. Players could roleplay various positions including: Starships, Cities, Starbases, Ground Parties, and Black Markets. The game tied for 8th place in Paper Mayhem's Best PBM Game of 1989.

== History and development ==
The Orion Nebula was an open-ended, mixed moderated PBM game published by Orpheus Publishing Corporation. The publisher launched the game in January 1990 after playtesting in 1989. Email and postal mail were orders options. Players could also use CompuServe for orders. In its September–October 1991 issue, the editor of Paper Mayhem announced that Orion's Nebula and its publisher were no longer running. The company's president stated in a letter to the editor that the game stopped in April 1991 due to financial issues and offered the game for sale.

== Gameplay ==
The Orion Nebula was a space opera with a massive intergalactic setting. Exploration, economics and combat were elements of gameplay. Although open-ended, the game had due dates for turn orders to enable simultaneous turn processing. Each turn comprised 150 time points of 2.25 hours each.

Players could roleplay various positions including: Starships, Cities, Starbases, Ground Parties, and Black Markets. Additional options of government types affected availability of spaceships and other factors. Groups of ten or more players could also custom-design a government type prior to game start.

== Reception ==
In its January–February 1990 issue of Paper Mayhem, the game tied for 8th place in the Best PBM Game of 1989 listing along with Continental Rails, Duelmaster, and Fleet Maneuvers.

== See also ==
- List of play-by-mail games

== Bibliography ==
- Grubb, Larry (May 1990). "Forming a Government in the 'Neb'". Flagship. No. 25 (U.S. ed.). pp. 17–18.
- Steel, Donal (April 1990). "First Looks: The Orion Nebula". The D2 Report. No. 3. pp. 4–6.
- Editors (January–February 1990). "Best PBM Game of 1989". Paper Mayhem. No. 40. p. 2.
- Webber, David (September–October 1991). "Where We're Heading". Paper Mayhem. No. 50. p. 3.
- McGee, John F. (September–October 1991). "Letters". Paper Mayhem. No. 50. p. 4.
