= Out Time Days =

Play-by-mail space combat game

- Designers: Werner Freitas
- Publishers: Twin Engine Gaming
- Years active: September 1985 to ~1997
- Genres: science fiction, play-by-mail
- Languages: English
- Players: single-player (among other players)
- Playing time: unlimited
- Materials required: Instructions, order sheets, turn results, paper, pencil
- Media type: Play-by-mail or email

Out Time Days (or OTD) is an open-ended, computer moderated, science fiction, play-by-mail (PBM) wargame. It was published by Twin Engine Gaming in September 1985. Players role-played a time-traveller stranded on a planet called Kolob. Exploration, time travel, economics, and combat were part of gameplay. The game received generally positive reviews in various gaming magazines in the 1980s and 1990s, tying for 1st place in Paper Mayhem's Best PBM Game of 1997 list.

== History and development ==
Out Time Days was a science fiction, role-playing, play-by-mail game published by Twin Engine Gaming of San Jose, CA. It was primarily computer moderated, and open-ended. Werner Freitas designed the game, enabling program modification over time.

After more than a year of playtesting, the game was published in September 1985. The gamemasters were Werner and Vicki Freitas.

== Gameplay ==
Gameplay occurs on a planet called Kolob, populated by non-player characters and various races. Reviewer J.W. Akers-Sassaman stated that players roleplay "human time travelers stranded on Kolob, [who] are seen by the native populace as being the great saviors that will fulfill a mysterious 'prophecy' and save the planet". Elements of gameplay included buildings and items, the latter created from sixteen types of building materials. Six factions were available for players to join.

After being taken unwillingly from Earth, players begin the game on Kolob alone with some basic equipment and provisions. Time traveling, combat, and economics were all game activities.

Order sheets were simple lined sheets of paper, enabling narrative, written turn orders.

== Reception ==
A reviewer in the November–December 1986 issue of Paper Mayhem highlighted the game's careful design, stating that it took a "seldom blazed trail to smooth and realistic mechanics, extensive detail, and a high quality game". In a 1990 issue of Paper Mayhem, reviewer J.W. Akers-Sassaman gave the game "four thumbs up". In the same issue, Out Time Days placed No. 3 out of 57 games in Paper Mayhem's PBM Game Ratings list with a 7.694 rating out of a possible 9.

Out Time Days tied for No. 1 in Paper Mayhem's Best PBM Games of 1997 list. (Note: The other No. 1 games were Adventurers Guild, Victory!, and World Conquest.) Tim Sullivan, the editor of the U.S. Edition of Flagship, stated that the game was "superlative" and "consistently deliver[ed] high quality adventure".

== See also ==
- List of play-by-mail games

== Bibliography ==
- Akers-Sassaman, J.W. (July–August 1990). "On Out Time Days". American Gamer. No. 1. pp. 14–17.
- Akers-Sassaman, J.W. (May–June 1990). "Out Time Days Review". Paper Mayhem. No. 42. pp. 40–44.
- Editors (May–June 1990). "PBM Game Ratings as of 3-19-90". Paper Mayhem. No. 42. p. 64.
- Editors (January–February 1998). "Best PBM Games of 1997". Paper Mayhem. No. 88. p. 2.
- Freitas, Werner (November–December 1986). "Designer's Notes". Paper Mayhem. No. 21. p. 9.
- Gissendaner, Scott (November–December 1986). "Out Time Days". Paper Mayhem. No. 21. pp. 7–8.
- Sullivan, Tim (February–March 1998). "From the Helm: Out Time Days". The D2 Report. No. 16. p. 30.
- Twin Engine Gaming (July–August 1986). "Gameline: Twin Engine Gaming". Paper Mayhem. No. 19. p. 26.
