= First World (game) =

Fantasy play-by-mail wargame

- Publishers: White Lion Enterprises, De Boje Games
- Years active: 1985 to unknown
- Genres: play-by-mail, fantasy, wargame
- Languages: English
- Playing time: open-ended
- Materials required: Instructions, order sheets, turn results, paper, pencil
- Media type: Play-by-mail or email

First World is an open-ended, mixed-moderated fantasy play-by-mail wargame.

== History and development ==
First World was an open-ended play-by-mail game. It was mixed-moderated. The game was initially published by John and Mike O'Brien of White Lion Enterprises. It was released in August 1984 after about a year of playtesting. Within several years, "a combination of factors slowed turn processing to a virtual standstill" and De Boje Games acquired the game in July 1988.

== Gameplay ==
The game was set on Earth in 100 million BCE. Players could role-play two types of tribes: a lizard race called Nazgars, and apes or humans. Gems were key to gameplay. According to reviewers John Kelly and Mike Scheid, they were used "to recruit followers, make magic, build robots, or for trade." Players had a wide variety of options during gameplay with no apparent restrictions.

== Reception ==
First World tied for 10th place in Paper Mayhem's Best PBM Game of 1986 list alongside Ad Astra, Atlantrix, Beyond the Stellar Empire, and Empyrean Challenge. Terry Cale reviewed the game in a 1986 issue of Flagship. He stated that "for a pleasant romp in a surprisingly viable and well-run small game, I heartily recommend First World." He warned that the game was not necessarily historically and scientifically accurate (e.g., humans and dinosaurs existing together), but that the game had the qualities that made it enjoyable for players. Reviewers Kelly and Scheid said the game was "probably not for everyone" but thought it would appeal to players who liked open-ended games with great freedom and rapid turnaround times.

== See also ==
- List of play-by-mail games

== Bibliography ==
- Cale, Terry (Summer 1986). "First World". Flagship. No. 11. pp. 18–19.
- Editors (September–October 1986). "Best PBM Game of 1986". Paper Mayhem. No. 20. p. 3.
- Kelly Jr., John W.; Scheid, Mike (May–June 1985). "Prehistoric PBM: First World in Review". Paper Mayhem. No. 12. pp. 26–27.
- Scheid, Mike (July–August 1989). "First World: A Classic PBM Returns from the Brink of Extinction". Paper Mayhem. No. 37. pp. 31–32.
- White Lion Enterprises (January–February 1985). "Gameline – News and Items: White Lion Enterprises". Paper Mayhem. No. 10. p. 14.
