= Star Saga (play-by-mail game) =

Play-by-mail role-playing game

- Publishers: Infinite Odysseys
- Genres: science fiction, space opera, role-playing
- Languages: English
- Players: unlimited
- Playing time: unlimited
- Materials required: Instructions, order sheets, turn results, paper, pencil
- Media type: Play-by-mail
- Synonyms: Star-Saga, Starsaga

Star Saga (also Star-Saga or Starsaga) is an open-ended, mixed-moderated, science fiction, play-by-mail (PBM) game. Infinite Odysseys published the game beginning in 1987, further improving the game over the next year. Star Saga was influenced by Traveller and Advanced Dungeons & Dragons, and was comparable to Starmaster. Players custom designed a home world with alien race. Players then had significant latitude to explore, colonize, wage war, and role-play in various ways in the game's sizable 3-dimensional map. The game received generally positive reviews in various gamer magazines in the 1980s and 1990s.

== History and development ==
Star Saga was an open-ended, space-based PBM game published by Infinite Odysseys of Hickory, North Carolina. The game launched in 1987. The game was mixed-moderated. Reviewer Stephen Marte thought the game generally similar to Starmaster. According to owner Brian Kinkopf, Star Saga drew mainly from Traveller and Advanced Dungeons & Dragons. Over nine months from 1987 to 1988, the publisher updated the game based on player feedback with two new rules editions and numerous other changes. Marte stated that, "Along the way, the game has incorporated enough nifty frills to make SS stand proudly among the premiere science fiction PBM's on the market". By mid-1988, there were 150 active players.

== Gameplay ==
At the outset, players started on a player-designed home world and designed an alien race. For race design, players used Design Points to choose a lifeform base (carbon, silicon or metallic), type such as "mammal, aerial, plant, protplasmic, [and] insectoid", as well as various abilities and attributes such as "forcefield, poison, density control, immunities, mental blast, teleportation ... types of appendages, outer covering, intelligence, and visual and auditory range". Players had great latitude to explore, colonize, wage war, and many other activities. The game setting is large. The 100×80×15-sector map allows 3d movement and comprises "tens of thousands of planets to explore".

== Reception ==
Stephan Wieck reviewed the game in the June–July 1988 issue of White Wolf, stating, the game is "a hell of a lot of fun." He rated it 6 of 10 points for Materials, 7 points for Moderation and Strategy, 10 points for Diplomacy, and an overall rating of 9. Trey Stone provided a positive review in the May–June 1995 issue of Flagship. He noted the need to manage "a bewildering amount of numbers", while stating that "with the wealth of options available, it is a game that all sci-fi fans should check out".

== See also ==
- List of play-by-mail games

== Bibliography ==
- Marte, Stephen (February 1989). "Star Saga: a Winner". Flagship. No. 20 (U.S. ed.). pp. 36–38.
- Stone, Trey (May–June 1995). "Civilization-Building on the Final Frontier". Flagship. No. 55. pp. 6–7.
- Wieck, Stephan (June–July 1988). "The PBM Reviews: Starsaga". White Wolf. No. 10. pp. 59–61.
