= Catacombs of Chaos =

Play-by-mail game

- Advertisement for game, Space Gamer #47
- Publishers: Schubel & Son
- Years active: ~1982 to unknown
- Genres: role-playing, play-by-mail
- Languages: English
- Playing time: unlimited
- Materials required: Instructions, order sheets, turn results, paper, pencil
- Media type: Play-by-mail or email

Catacombs of Chaos is a fantasy play-by-mail game that was published in 1982 and computer-moderated by Schubel & Son.

== Gameplay ==
Catacombs of Chaos is a turn-based dungeon-exploration game where each player controls a party of characters exploring the catacombs of a late wizard, Clanthor the Magnificent.

As a first step, players chose a "quest" for their party: Cleric, Consumers, Hunters, Plunderers, Seekers, Terrors, and Undead, each with different character classes available. The player then created up to ten customizable characters, using 100 points to purchase characters and their abilities. As critic David Macnamara noted, "You can make one superhero with 100 points, or 10 average guys with 10 points each, as long as you don't use more than 100 total." Dungeons ranged from 160 to 600 rooms per game. Each character could take one action per turn, with a maximum of 19 actions per party per turn (Room Search, Rest, Take Item, Move, Defend, and Melee), expressed by coding characters and actions onto a computer card, which was then mailed to the Game Master, who fed the card into an optical card reader.

=== Cost and turn around ===
Set-up cost $5. The turn fee was $1.75, plus 25 cents for each character. (The cost for the party remains the same even if a character is killed.) A special $1 charge was made if the player smudged or mutilated the computer card, or did not use a soft lead pencil.

== Publication history ==
Schubel & Sons, publisher of several science fiction PBM games such as StarMaster, published Catacombs of Chaos in 1982 at the same time as rival Flying Buffalo published the similarly-themed Heroic Fantasy.

== Reception ==
In Issue 57 of The Space Gamer, W. G. Armintrout compared Catacombs of Chaos to its rival, Flying Buffalo's Heroic Fantasy, and concluded, "There's just no doubt that Heroic Fantasy is the better game ... Things move faster — a party can pick up treasure and leave a room in one turn, something that takes two turns in Catacombs." Armintrout also noted "it was my understanding that use of optical-mark sorting equipment and computer cards would reduce the cost of processing a game, but Catacombs costs more than Heroic. Armintrout concluded, "Catacombs of Chaos is an ill-explained and confusing game. The worst problem lies with the lack of information given to the players about such basics as character design, magic, and combat."

In the April 1983 edition of Dragon (Issue 72), Michael Gray found the game to be very similar to Heroic Fantasy by Flying Buffalo.

A reviewer in a 1983 issue of PBM Universal stated that, other than no available special actions, "the game is fine".

In Issue 27 of Abyss, David Macnamara called this "Another loser from Schubel and Son ... This game had promise, but not much. As usual, greed and banality with contempt for the intelligence of gamers as a class, are the foundations for this offering." Macnamara pointed out that despite the fact that the gamemaster only had to run a stack of computer cards through an optical reader, print out the result and mail it back costs for the game were unreasonably high. Macnamara concluded, "Go ahead and play it, it's only money."

John C. Muir reviewed the game in a 1983 issue of Nuts & Bolts of PBM, and characterized gameplay as "dull" due to the slow pace. He recommended playing only if the game was revised and improved.

== See also ==
- List of play-by-mail games

== Bibliography ==
- Armintrout, W. G. (November 1982). "The Great Buffalo Hunt: Heroic Fantasy vs. Catacombs of Chaos Featured Review". The Space Gamer. No. 57. pp. 2–5.
- Editors (November–December 1983). "Gamealog: Catacombs of Chaos". PBM Universal. No. 1. p. 28.
- Gray, Michael (April 1983). "The PBM scene: Facts You Can Use When YOU Choose What Game to Play". Dragon. No. 72. TSR, Inc. p. 31.
- Muir, John C. (1983). "Catacombs of Chaos". Nuts & Bolts of Gaming. Vol. 3, no. 14. pp. 20–21.
- Townsend, Jim (1988). "The PBM Corner". White Wolf Magazine. No. 11. p. 20.
