= Westworld (game) =

Play-by-mail Western role-playing game

- Designers: George Cameron, Jack Harriman
- Publishers: NLT Enterprises (US)
- Years active: 1993 to unknown
- Genres: Western, role-playing
- Languages: English
- Systems: hand-moderation
- Materials required: Instructions, order sheets, turn results, paper, pencil
- Media type: Play-by-mail or email

Westworld is a hand-moderated, western role-playing play-by-mail (PBM) game. Designed by George Cameron and Jack Harriman and launched in 1993, it was moderated from prison. A reviewer compared it to the PBM game Stand and Deliver. Gameplay was simple with a variety of orders possible. Players could choose various character types such as Gunslinger, Bandito, and Indian, and interact with non-player characters within the game. Westworld received some generally positive reviews from gaming magazines in the mid-1990s.

== History and development ==
Westworld was a western, role-playing PBM game that became available for play in 1993. George Cameron and Jack Harriman were the designers. The game was hand-moderated from the William E. Donaldson Correctional Facility. This required payment to the publishing company and correspondence with the gamemaster separately. Reviewer Patrick M. Rodgers compared the game to the PBM game Stand and Deliver, which both game designers played. As of 1994, the publisher stated that there were more than fifty players and one hundred non-player characters in the game.

== Gameplay ==
Gameplay was uncomplicated, and reviewer John C. Muir noted that it was "a beer-and-pretzels game that doesn't get involved in math or coded input sheets". Players could choose from various character types including Gunslinger, Bandito, and Indian.

The approximately 75 general orders available provided great leeway. These allowed players to "join an alliance, catch stray wild horses, catch a train … pan for gold, blow up a building, shoot at targets, start a stampede, see a teacher, or … work in town". 13 "Certain Orders" were available for an extra charge, such as "'Fist Fight,' 'High Noon,' 'Start/Run a Cattle Ranch,'" and adult options such as "Visit Cathouse." (Note: Age verification was required for adult options.) Additional order types were Very Special Orders which related to character type and Einstein Orders for player personality. Non-player characters were available to interact with, as well as other players.

== Reception ==
In the May–June 1996 issue of Paper Mayhem, Trey Stone noted that the game would not appeal to players favoring diplomacy but stated that "I fully recommend this game without reservation, if you like adventure games, interesting settings, lots of things to explore and do, and gunfights, barroom brawls, card games, etc." In the January–February 1994 issue of Shadis, Patrick M. Rodgers stated that those liking westerns and roleplaying may be interested in the game. In the September–October 1994 issue of Paper Mayhem, John C. Muir, who also participated in the Westworld playtest, stated that he enjoyed the game and it provided value for the money while noting that "service has been good, and the gamemaster's printing is very readable".

== See also ==
- List of play-by-mail games

== Bibliography ==
- Muir, John C. (September–October 1994). "Westworld: A Mini Review". Paper Mayhem. No. 68. pp. 4, 6.
- Rodgers, Patrick M. (January–February 1994). "Post Marque: Westworld". Shadis. No. 11. p. 75.
- Stone, Trey (May–June 1996). "Westworld: Ridin' the Range". Paper Mayhem. No. 78. pp. 11–12.
