= Saturnalia (disambiguation) =

Saturnalia is an ancient Roman festival in honor of the god Saturn.

Saturnalia may also refer to:

== Literature ==
- Saturnalia (Callin novel), a 1986 science fiction novel by Grant Callin
- Saturnalia (Davis novel), a 2007 crime novel by Lindsey Davis
- Saturnalia (Macrobius), a work of Ambrosius Theodosius Macrobius
- Saturnalia (webcomic), a science fiction cartoon series by Nina Matsumoto

== Music ==
- Saturnalia (The Gutter Twins album) (2008)
- Saturnalia (The Wedding Present album) (1996)
- "Saturnalia" (song), a song by Marilyn Manson

== Other uses ==
- Saturnalia (dinosaur), a genus of dinosaur
- Saturnalia (horse) (foaled 2016), a Japanese Thoroughbred racehorse
- Saturnalia (play-by-mail game), a swords-and-sorcery play-by-mail game
- Saturnalia Fossae, a network of troughs on the asteroid 4 Vesta
- Saturnalia (video game), a survival horror video game
- "Saturnalia" (Plebs), a 2013 television episode
