= Alien Conflict =

Science fiction play-by-mail game

- Publishers: Schubel & Son
- Years active: 1983 to unknown
- Genres: Role-playing, science fiction
- Languages: English
- Materials required: Instructions, order sheets, turn results, paper, pencil
- Media type: Play-by-mail

Alien Conflict is a play-by-mail game by Schubel & Son begun in 1983.

== Gameplay ==
Alien Conflict was a play-by-mail computer-moderated game in which the players are part of the Kastron Sandpeople who abduct aliens from their worlds for arena combat. Players could use a custom character design or import one from Starmaster.

== Reception ==
W.G. Armintrout reviewed Alien Conflict in Space Gamer No. 65. Armintrout commented that "Designing an alien is challenging, while actual play is beer-and-pretzels fun. Except for the high price, I can recommend Alien Conflict to everyone."

== See also ==
- List of play-by-mail games
