= Strategic Conflict =

Play-by-mail wargame

- Publishers: Schubel & Son
- Years active: 1983 to unknown
- Genres: play-by-mail
- Languages: English
- Systems: computer moderated
- Players: 10
- Playing time: Months
- Materials required: Instructions, order sheets, turn results, paper, pencil
- Media type: Play-by-mail

Strategic Conflict is a play-by-mail game by Schubel & Son begun in 1983.

== Gameplay ==
Strategic Conflict was a computer-moderated play-by-mail game set in modern times, involving nations fighting each other for supremacy in their region of the world. It had ten players and a world with twenty regions. Players could choose from up to eight types of combat units. Players owned and built units worth points, with no more than 250 points in each region. A player reaching 2,000 points of units won the game.

== Reception ==
W.G. Armintrout reviewed Strategic Conflict in Space Gamer No. 68. He stated that it "s the most intricate, subtle game yet produced by the play-by-mail industry. Armintrout further commented that "I have not been impressed like this in some time – Strategic Conflict is a play-by-mail game for players who want a real contest. I only hope there are enough of this type of player out there to keep the game going."

A reviewer in a 1983 issue of PBM Universal stated that "The game has no outstanding flaws, and is playable".

== See also ==
- List of play-by-mail games
