= Company Commander (play-by-mail game) =

Play-by-mail wargame

- Publishers: Schubel & Son, Escape From Reality, Jason Oats Games
- Years active: 1980s to present
- Genres: Military strategy, Wargame, play-by-mail
- Languages: English
- Materials required: Instructions, order sheets, turn results, paper, pencil
- Media type: Play-by-mail or email
- Website: http://www.jason-oates-games.com/Company_Commander.html

Company Commander is a play-by-mail wargame initially published by Schubel & Son in the 1980s. Jason Oates Games is the current publisher.

== Development ==
Schubel & Son published Company Commander in the 1980s. (Note: Schubel & Son was the publisher noted in a 1986 review of Company Commander by Bill Flad.) As of 1991, the company Escape from Reality was at least the third publisher of the game. As of August 2019, Jason Oates Games was the publisher.

The setting for the game has changed over time. In 1986, it was Thailand. In 1991, the setting was Egypt. In 2001, the setting for the game was a fictional country in South America. As of 2022, the current game—version 13—takes place in a country called Malanesia, a combination of the countries of Malaysia and Indonesia.

== Gameplay ==
The game is closed-ended. Players lead a faction in a fictional country. In the 1991 version, players control a squad of ten soldiers battling in Egypt. Gameplay involves management of money, movement, and combat, where players must manage the supporting aspects of forces as well as the combat units.

In the 2002 version, victory was attained by achieving control of five towns in the country, although the game map comprised a few hundred uninhabited villages as well. Towns are divided into sectors and are defended by government forces. According to reviewer Peter Jull, "Your aim in Company Commander is to defeat your rivals in battle, but the logistical and economic aspects of doing so feature heavily in the game." (Note: The words "Company Commander" are bolded in the original.)

== Reception ==
Bill Flad reviewed the game in the November–December 1986 issue of Paper Mayhem magazine. He stated that the game was "of unparalleled anticipation and promise, but inevitable disappointment and frustration". He also pointed to the high cost, noting that Schubel & Son even forewarned players of the high expense, and provided examples in 1986 from gameplay where he was charged $21 for being attacked by another player and a friend who spent $65 on a single complicated turn. Phil Chenevert reviewed the game in the September–October 1991 issue of Paper Mayhem, stating that it, "has been around for a long time now, and will continue to be a popular game into the next century because it is well-designed, fun to play and exciting." He noted issues with the game at the time as cost and "gamemaster errors". He summarized that "Company Commander is a fine game for those who like to buy and maneuver small force and smash them into other forces. ... It feels good. I like it."

== See also ==
- List of play-by-mail games

== Bibliography ==
- Chenevert, Phil (September–October 1991). "Company Commander". Paper Mayhem. No. 50. pp. 14–18.
- "Company Commander 14". Jason Oats Games. 2022.
- Flad, Bill (November–December 1986). "Review of Company Commander". Paper Mayhem. No. 21. pp. 14–16.
- Jull, Peter (April–May 2002). "Company Commander: Building for Battles" (PDF). Flagship Magazine. No. 96. TimePatterns PBM Games. pp. 28–29.
- Mostellar, Charles (6 January 2011). "PBM Boneyard". Archived from the original on 24 October 2021.
- Saunders, Mike (August 2019). "Company Commander: An Encounter with Jason Oates Games" (PDF). Suspense and Decision. No. 18. playbymail.net. pp. 12–18.
- Tempesta, Den (June–July 2002). "Company Commander" (PDF). Flagship Magazine. No. 97. TimePatterns PBM Games. p. 28.
