= Star Venture =

Science fiction play-by-mail game

- Designers: George V. Schubel
- Publishers: Schubel & Son
- Years active: 1982 to Unknown
- Genres: Space fantasy, Grand diplomacy
- Languages: English
- Systems: Computer moderated
- Playing time: Open-ended
- Materials required: Instructions, order sheets, turn results, paper, pencil
- Media type: Play-by-mail

Star Venture is a play-by-mail game begun by Schubel & Son in 1982. The game was open-ended and computer moderated.

== Gameplay ==
"Many players have come into the game from Schubel & Son's Tribes of Crane, and a more competitive and cunning collection of players would be hard to find."

— W.G. Armintrout, 1983.

Star Venture was a play-by-mail computer-moderated game set in a 125-star galaxy, in which each player has one or more starships at their disposal to use in whatever way they need. The game is open-ended and players have no victory conditions to achieve to win the game.

Within certain limits, players begin at their starport (called Imperia) by purchasing from a menu of available starships. Ships are differentiated by space available to carry items (cargo, weapons, personnel, etc.), and their damage rating. Players use ground parties and colonies to explore worlds in the game; according to reviewer W.G. Armintrout, "Colonies are what people fight over", for economic reasons. Combat is part of the game to include combat between ships and between ships and colonies. According to Armintrout, competition in the game was fierce because many players came from Schubel & Son's game The Tribes of Crane. He also noted the importance of alliances in the game.

== Reception ==
In the April 1983 edition of Dragon (Issue 72), Michael Gray stated "This game is thematically quite like Star Master, though it seems to be more closely structured."

W.G. Armintrout reviewed Star Venture in The Space Gamer No. 63. Armintrout commented that "Star Venture is a fascinating game. I recommend it, with a few warnings: (1) This is not a game for novices, and (2) it requires some mathematical ability and a blazing competitive will. I also commend Schubel & Son for their lightning speed in publishing errata and in implementing player suggestions (already adding convoy and special message rules)."

== See also ==
- List of play-by-mail games

== Bibliography ==
- Armintrout, W.G. (May–June 1983). "Star Mail: Three New PBM Space Games". The Space Gamer. No. 63. Steve Jackson Games. pp. 6–8.
- Gray, Michael (April 1983). "The PBM scene: Facts You Can Use When YOU Choose What Game To Play". Dragon. No. 72. TSR, Inc. p. 32.
