= Adastra =

Adastra (from Latin ad astra, "to the stars") may refer to:

- Adastra Films, a French film production company
- Adastra Minerals, a British mining company
- Johnson RHJ-6 Adastra, an American glider design
- Adastra, the ship in "Proxima Centauri", a 1935 short story by Murray Leinster
- Adastra, a typeface designed in 1928 by Herbert Thannhaeuser of D. Stempel AG

== See also ==
- Ad astra (disambiguation)
