= Settlers of America: Trails to Rails =

Settlers of America: Trails to Rails is a 2010 German style board game created by Klaus Teuber and distributed by Mayfair Games. It is the first Settlers of Catan-series game to be distributed exclusively in the English language, and the third game in the Catan Histories line of games, which adapts the Settlers of Catan game mechanics to various historical contexts.

== Gameplay ==
Each player begins with control of three cities in the continental United States east of the Mississippi River. Adjacent to each city are hexes which produce resources. These in turn allow players to expand their territory. At the start of a player's turn, players roll a pair of dice, with any hex matching the number rolled producing one of five resources: brick, cattle, coal, grain, and lumber. Unlike regular Catan, when players do not produce on any of their cities, they draw a gold instead. As players move westward, numbers may be reassigned to hexes, and certain hexes will no longer produce.

Players may spend their resources on settlers, which may move about the board by spending wheat. If a settler ends their movement on a pre-determined city-site (corresponding to various American cities), then the settler is converted into a city, which will produce resources like any other city on the board. Players may also spend resources to build rails to connect cities (not necessarily their own) together, and trains to move along the rails (like settlers, for additional resource cost). Players gain gold for connecting city-sites to the rail network, and gold may be used to purchase resources or move trains along opposing players' rails.

As new cities are built, goods may be delivered to each city. At the start of the game, each player may deliver one good; one additional good may be delivered with the founding of a new city. Each city on the board may accept the delivery of one good, but a player may not deliver goods to their own cities. The first player to deliver all of their goods (10 in a standard game) is declared the winner.

== Reception ==
Settlers of America: Trails to Rails was awarded the Origins Award for "Best Miniatures Rules" of 2010.
