= Atlantrix =

Play-by-mail role-playing game

- Publishers: Battle-Magic Gaming
- Years active: 1984 to unknown
- Genres: play-by-mail, fantasy
- Languages: English
- Playing time: unlimited
- Materials required: Instructions, order sheets, turn results, paper, pencil
- Media type: Play-by-mail or email

Atlantrix is a fantasy roleplaying, play-by-mail game. First published by Atlantrix Studios in 1984, it was later published by Battle-Magic Gaming.

== History and development ==
Atlantrix is a fantasy roleplaying, play-by-mail game. It was hand-moderated, and open-ended. First published in 1984, in 1986, Atlantrix Studios published the game, and as of 1990, the publisher was Battle-Magic Gaming.

== Gameplay ==
The game's setting is a city called Atlantrix situated on an island. Gameplay starts with customizable characters of little experience, skill, money, and energy with some basic equipment. Character traits included Accuracy, Balance and Coordination, Intelligence, Social Appeal, Speed, Strength, and Timing and Reaction.

Dueling is central to advancement. Although everyone starts as a fighter, magic user classes are available as players rise in stature. Besides city exploration, dungeons and caves are available to players.

== Reception ==
In 1986, Atlantrix tied for 10th place in Paper Mayhem's Best PBM Game of 1986 list. (Note: The other games tied for 10th place were Ad Astra, Beyond the Stellar Empire, Empyrean Challenge, and First World. Atlantrix's listed publisher was Atlantrix.) Robert Woodard reviewed the game in a 1996 issue of Paper Mayhem, noting that of the PBM games he played in the previous seven years, "Atlantra is one of the best".

== See also ==
- List of play-by-mail games

== Bibliography ==
- Mills, Craig (July–August 1990). "From the Turtle's Back - Atlantrix". American Gamer. No. 1. pp. 18–22.
- Mills, Craig (July–August 1990). "Passing the Flame - Atlantrix". American Gamer. No. 1. pp. 23–25.
- Battle-Magic Gaming [Ad] (July–August 1990). "Atlantrix". American Gamer. No. 1. p. 22.
- Editors (September–October 1986). "Best PBM Game of 1986". Paper Mayhem. No. 20. p. 4.
- Woodard, Robert R. (November–December 1996). "Atlantrix: 20 Turns in the Life of Magni Thorson". Paper Mayhem. No. 81. pp. 8–10.
