= Takamo =

Space-based play-by-mail game

- Title image
- Designers: Randy Ritnour; Al Edeker; Bill Bunselmeyer; Bill Hayes
- Publishers: Advent Games, Aleator Games, Kgruppe LLC
- Years active: 1982 to present (break in 1996–1997)
- Genres: science fiction, play-by-mail
- Languages: English
- Players: 300 per galaxy
- Playing time: unlimited
- Chance: Medium
- Age range: 18+
- Materials required: Instructions, order sheets, turn results, paper, pencil
- Media type: Play-by-email or email
- Website: http://www.takamouniverse.com/takamo/

Takamo is an open-ended, computer moderated, space-based play-by-email (PBeM) game. Advent Games launched it as a play-by-mail game in 1982 with a subsequent game, Takamo II, in 1990. Takamo saw a break in play in 1996–1997, after which it restarted as a PBEM game in 1998. By 2001, Aleator Games was publishing the game for play online. In 2014, Kgruppe LLC took over publication of the game, which remains available for play online for free as of April 2026.

Takamo is a strategy game of space exploration and combat. Players choose from eight empire types which are further customizable by biology, feeding method, environment, and government type. Gameplay occurs in one of multiple playable galaxies which are massive in size. Players of the PBM versions could submit ten actions per turn with the option to purchase more. The current play-by-email version allows 90 actions per turn and is free to play. Play at the start focuses on "survival and expansion" with combat as a game element. The game received generally positive reviews in various gaming magazines from the 1980s to the 2010s.

== History and development ==
Takamo is a space-based, open-ended, science fiction play-by-email game of medium complexity. The four founders of Advent Games Randy Ritnour, Al Edeker, Bill Bunselmeyer, and Bill Hayes designed the game in 1981. It was initially published by Advent Games in 1982 as a play-by-mail game. According to the Takamo Rules, the name came from "TAI (Universe) and KHA'MO (ebb and flow)".

The first playtest occurred in a single sector with less than 15 players, with the second in a full universe. In 1986, there were ten playable galaxies, which serviced four different player turn frequency times (unlimited or one, two, and four weeks). There was a break in service in 1996–1997. In 1998, it restarted as a play-by-email game (PBEM). By 2001, Aleator Games was the publisher and the game was play-by-email with an online player interface for turn submission. In 2023, Kgruppe LLC is the game publisher.

In 1990, Advent Games launched Takamo II, a closed-ended version of Takamo with 25 players in a smaller universe.

== Gameplay ==
Takamo is a game of space exploration and combat. Players choose empire types which include "Agricultural Corporation, Cybernetic Race, Independent Civilization Builder, Mining Corporation, Nomad, Pirate, Smuggler, and Trade Corporation", which are further customizable by biology, feeding method, environment, and government type.

Galaxies are massive in size. Each comprises 17,576 sectors in a 3D map. (Note: According to Scheid, "Each sector is broken down into a three by three cube of 27 subsectors, and each subsector may hold as many as five star systems.") Players can make ten actions per turn with the option to purchase more. Thirty actions per turn was the maximum in 1986. By 2001 this had increased to forty, and in 2014, the limit was increased to ninety actions per turn.

At game start, players focus on "survival and expansion". Combat is an element of gameplay with success depending primarily on the size of the force and its technology level.

As of 2023, the game is playable online through a web interface for free. Its five galaxies comprise "thousands of player-run empires per galaxy and tens of thousands of computer-operated worlds".

== Reception ==
Bob McLain reviewed the game in a 1984 issue of Gaming Universal. He recommended the game, stating that it was "a fine brew of all the best features evinced by other PBM space simulations". Mike Scheid reviewed the game in a 1986 issue of Paper Mayhem, calling it an "interesting and enjoyable game".

Wilf Nixon reviewed the game in a 1989 issue of Flagship, stating that he "found Takamo enjoyable for the most part, without being swept off my feet. The game genuinely rewards those who gather their data and plan their economy carefully. If that sounds like you, then give Takamo a try. David Callum reviewed the game in a 2001 issue of Flagship, stating that "this game is ideal for the loner or the player who enjoys a leisurely exploration of the galaxy without too many hassles from other players. Alternatively, if you and your friends are budding megalomaniacs, then join up and kick some life into the game!"

== See also ==
- List of play-by-mail games

== Bibliography ==
- Arnold, Jim (November–December 1990). "Takamo II". Paper Mayhem. No. 45. pp. 11–12.
- Callan, David (January–February 2001). "Takamo: Interstellar Empires in a Huge Galaxy". Flagship. No. 89. U.S. Edition. pp. 16–17.
- Editors (2013). "Takamo – The Original Game". Kgruppe.
- McLain, Bob (January–February 1984). "Gamealog: Takamo". Gaming Universal. No. 2. p. 44.
- Nixon, Wilf (1989). "Takamo: Space Strategy". Flagship. No. 20. U.S. Edition. pp. 39–40.
- Ritnour, Randy (December 2013). "Takamo: Yesterday and Today". Suspense & Decision. No. 2. pp. 23–24.
- Scheid, Mike (September–October 1986). "The Ever-Expanding Universe of Takamo". Paper Mayhem. No. 20. pp. 7–9.
- Walla, Thom (March–April 2001). "Takamo: From the Beginning to Now". Flagship. No. 90. U.S. Edition. pp. 16–17.
