= Victory! The Battle for Europe =

Play-by-mail wargame

- Title image
- Publishers: Rolling Thunder Games, Inc.
- Publication: 1991; 35 years ago
- Genres: Military strategy, play-by-mail
- Languages: English
- Players: 40
- Playing time: 3 years (regular game)
- Materials required: Instructions, order sheets, turn results, paper, pencil
- Media type: Play-by-mail or email
- Website: http://www.rollingthunder.com/OurGames.htm#victory

Victory! The Battle for Europe is a closed-end, military strategy, play-by-mail (PBM) wargame. The game was first published by Rolling Thunder Games, Inc. in 1991 after a period of initial growth in the PBM industry. The game centers on Europe while including parts of North Africa, the Middle East, the United States, and Canada. Forty players start each game with equal resources among countries, although geography causes differences between starting positions. Games last for about three years each. The game received positive reviews and rankings in the PBM magazine Paper Mayhem in the 1990s, including tying for second place in its Best PBM Game of 1995 list.

== Play-by-mail genre ==
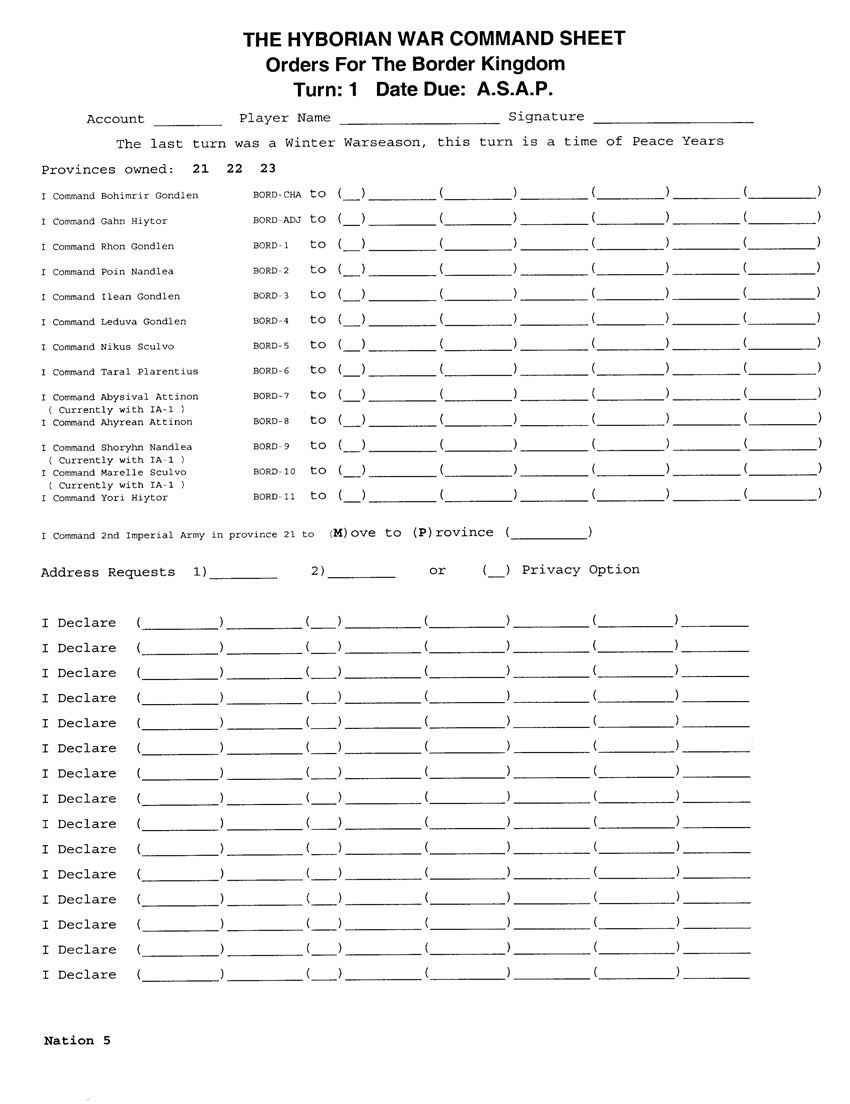
Example turn 1 order sheet for the Border Kingdom

Play-by-mail (PBM) games feature a number of differences from tabletop games. The typical PBM game involves many more players than an average tabletop game can support. (Note: For example, the PBM game It's a Crime can accommodate 110 players per game.) PBM game lengths are usually longer, depending on a number of factors. Turnaround time is how long a player has to prepare and submit "orders" (moves and changes to make in the game) and the company has to process them and send back turn results. The average turnaround time in the 1980s was two weeks, but some modern PBM games are play-by-email (PBEM) with shorter turnaround times of twice per week or faster. (Note: For example, the PBM game Covert Operations allows twice-per-week moves, daily moves, and private games where players can specify turn around times.) Open ended games allow players to strengthen their positions without end, with players continually entering and leaving the game. Examples include Heroic Fantasy and Monster Island. Conversely, closed end games typically have all players starting on equal terms, with rapid, intense, player vs. player gameplay that ends when a player or group achieves some victory condition or is unopposed. Examples include Hyborian War and It's a Crime. The complexity of PBM games can range from the relatively simple to the PBM game Empyrean Challenge, once described as "the most complex game system on Earth". (Note: Vern Holford, owner of Superior Simulations, developed Empyrean Challenge, a PBM game that reviewer Jim Townsend described in 1988 as "the most complex game system on Earth" with some turn results for large positions at 1,000 pages in length. According to Townsend, in those cases there was a significant investment in time to understand what happened on a turn as well as to fill out future turn orders. He said a player without a spreadsheet was "nearly doomed from the outset".)

Once a player has chosen a game and receives an initial game setup, gameplay begins. This generally involves players filling out order sheets for a game (see example image) and sending them to the gaming company. The company processes the turns and returns the results to the player, who completes a subsequent order sheet. Diplomacy is also frequently an important—sometimes indispensable—part of gameplay. The initial choice of a PBM game requires consideration as there is a wide array of possible roles to play, from pirates to space characters to "previously unknown creatures". Close identification with a role typically increases a player's game satisfaction. (Note: This section is taken from the Play-by-mail genre section of the Hyborian War Wikipedia article.)

=== History ===
Some games have long been played by mail between two players, such as chess and Go. PBM play of Diplomacy—a multiplayer game—began in 1963. The emergence of the professional PBM industry occurred less than a decade later. Rick Loomis, "generally recognized as the founder of the PBM industry", accomplished this by launching Flying Buffalo Inc. and his first PBM game, Nuclear Destruction, in 1970. Professional game moderation started in 1971 at Flying Buffalo. (Note: Flying Buffalo later added games such as Battleplan and Heroic Fantasy along with Starweb and others. By the late 1980s these games were all computer moderated.) Chris Harvey started commercial PBM play afterward in the United Kingdom with a company called ICBM through an agreement with Loomis and Flying Buffalo. ICBM, followed by KJC games and Mitregames, led the UK PBM industry. For approximately five years, Flying Buffalo was the single dominant company in the US PBM industry until Schubel & Son entered the field in about 1976 with the human-moderated The Tribes of Crane. Superior Simulations was the next significant PBM company to enter the US market. They did so in 1978 with the game Empyrean Challenge.

The early 1980s saw additional growth for PBM. The player base grew and game moderators were plentiful. The PBM industry in 1980 comprised two large companies and some small ones. The most popular games in 1980 were Starweb and Tribes of Crane. In 1981, some PBM players launched another company, Adventures by Mail, with the "immensely popular" Beyond the Stellar Empire. (Note: This section draws from portions of the History section of the Wikipedia Play-by-mail game article.)

The proliferation of PBM companies in the 1980s supported the publication of a number of newsletters from individual play-by-mail companies as well as independent publications which focused solely on the play-by-mail gaming industry such as the relatively short-lived The Nuts & Bolts of PBM and Gaming Universal. The PBM genre's two preeminent magazines of the period were Flagship and Paper Mayhem.

The 1990s brought additional changes to the PBM world. For example, in the early 1990s, email became an option to transmit turn orders and results. It was in this environment that Victory! The Battle for Europe launched.

== Description and gameplay ==
Final map from Game 87 of Victory!

Rolling Thunder Games, Inc. announced the game's launch in the September–October 1991 issue of Paper Mayhem magazine. (Note: Rolling Thunder Games stated that it had its first three regular speed games underway in the same issue.) It is a closed-end play-by-mail wargame. Game turns are on a 15 or 21-day turnaround schedule.

Forty players begin each game of Victory! with a starting year of 1939. The game centers on Europe while including North Africa, the Middle East, the United States, and Canada. Each player begins with equal resources, money and factories. However, geography creates differences in starting positions to include country size and number of bordering countries, and terrain considerations. Players can choose a technology suite for their air, ground, and naval forces that are preselected (for the American, British, German, and Russian technology) or manually select technology for their forces for other countries.

Players also have Fixed Defense Units available to array including Local Defense Battalions, Light and Heavy Anti-Aircraft Batteries, Security units, and Special Operations Units: (Rangers). Fortifications for provinces and cities are also available for defense. Special Commanders and Training Programs are additional factors players can employ, the former to influence the success of operations, for example, and the latter to increase the effectiveness of units. Players must also manage their economies carefully during gameplay. Diplomacy plays a significant role during gameplay, although there is a privacy option to prevent contact with a player. Aggressive play is rewarded.

"A game of Victory takes a long time to play. You can start in Northern Russia and end the game battling for the city of Gibraltar."

— Ray Andrews. Paper Mayhem, March–April 1998.

Players work toward victory conditions during the game. The player with the most victory points at the end of the game is the winner. According to the publisher, "success in the game is achieved as a result of survival through manifest destiny." Games can last up to 73 turns. Games last for 1,095 days, or three years each. (Note: Although the rules state three years exactly, Rolling Thunder Games notes that a regular-paced game can last for "about three years".)

== Reception ==
Donald J. Lund, the organizer of the PBM Player's Guild of the period, reviewed Victory! in the July–August 1991 issue of Paper Mayhem while playing in Game No. 1. Although he suggested "more glitter" for the maps and more photos in the rulebook, he stated that "this game and company are quality". In the September–October 1991 issue of Paper Mayhem, Victory! placed No. 1 out of 82 games in its PBM Game ratings list. The game tied for No. 2 in Paper Mayhem's Best PBM Games of 1995. (Note: Victory! tied with Legends for the No. 2 spot. with Adventurers Guild placing 1st.) Allen Viduka reviewed the game in the May–June 1996 issue of Paper Mayhem magazine, stating that "this game is one of the finest on the market today". In the same issue, Victory! scored No. 2 out of 42 PBM games as rated by its readers with a rating of 8.267 out of 9.

Dr. Robert J. Bunker reviewed Victory! "The Battle for Europe" in White Wolf #46 (Aug., 1994) and stated that "This company has an excellent reputation for quality service concerning mailing times, for limited programming bugs and for customer relations. The only downside to this game is its complexity."

== See also ==
- List of play-by-mail games

== Bibliography ==
- Andrews, Ray (March–April 1998). "Victory 101: Introduction to Survival". Paper Mayhem. No. 89. pp. 16–20.
- Babcock, Chris (December 2013). "Diplomacy" (PDF). Suspense and Decision. No. 2. p. 16. Archived from the original (PDF) on July 4, 2021.
- DuBois, Steven (January–February 1997). "Monster Island: A Review". Paper Mayhem. No. 82. p. 4.
- Editors (July–August 1985). "Rick Loomis on Play-By-Mail [Editor Intro]". The Space Gamer. No. #75. p. 35.
- Flying Buffalo, Inc. "Covert Operations". Flying Buffalo Inc.
- Greenberg, Andrew (May–June 1993). "PBM Corner: A Beginning in Play-By-Mail; Is it Worth It?". White Wolf Magazine. No. 36. pp. 8–9.
- Harvey, Chris (Spring 1984). "The Future of PBM". Flagship. No. 2. p. 21.
- Harvey, Chris (April–May 2003). "My Life in Games" (PDF). Flagship. No. 102. p. 26.
- KJC Games. "It's a Crime (Rule Page)". KJC Games.
- Lindahl, Greg. "PBM / PBEM List Index: closed-ended". Play by Email (PBeM) & Play by Mail (PBM) List Index.
- Loth III, John Kevin (March–April 1986). "A PBM Primer". Paper Mayhem. No. 17. p. 42.
- Lund, Donald J. (July–August 1991). "Victory! "The Battle For Europe"". Paper Mayhem. No. 49. pp. 22–29.
- McLain, Bob (August 1, 1993). "Play By Mail: The Infancy of Cyberspace". Pyramid. sjgames.com.
- Mouchet, Paul (February 2017). "PBM: Reducing the "Barrier to Entry"" (PDF). Suspense and Decision. No. 15. PlayByMail.net. pp. 10–12. Archived from the original (PDF) on October 30, 2020.
- Paduch, Sally (June 27, 1993). "Email Brings Immediacy to Play-By-Mail Games". New York Times. p. RC21.
- Paper Mayhem editors (January–February 1993). "Front Matter". Paper Mayhem. No. 58. p. 1.
- Palmer, Nicky (January 2003). "Flagship 100: A Founder's Memories" (PDF). Flagship. No. 100. p. 4.
- "PBM Game Ratings as of 7–14–91". Paper Mayhem. No. 50. September–October 1991. pp. 54–55.
- "PBM Game Ratings". Paper Mayhem. No. 78. May–June 1996. p. 29.
- Popolizio, Mike; LeBlanc, Liz; Popolizio, Marti (January–February 1990). "Revamping a Classic! The Redesign of BSE". Paper Mayhem. No. 40. pp. 8–10.
- Rolling Thunder Games (March–April 1992). "Gameline: Victory! The Battle for Europe". Paper Mayhem. No. 53. p. 28.
- "Rolling Thunder Games". Paper Mayhem. No. 50. September–October 1991. p. 31.
- "Rules & Software: Victory! Rules Addendum". Rolling Thunder Games, Inc. May 1995.
- "Rules & Software: Victory! Game Policies & Notes". Rolling Thunder Games, Inc.
- "Rules & Software: Chapter A: Introduction and Getting Started". Rolling Thunder Games, Inc.
- "The Survivors". Rolling Thunder Games, Inc.
- "TSG Surveys: Play-By-Mail Game Companies". The Space Gamer. No. 33. November 1980. p. 13.
- Townsend, Jim (January–February 1987). "How to Win in PBM—An Organizational Viewpoint". Paper Mayhem. No. 22. p. 29.
- Townsend, Jim (March–April 1987). "A Real Look at Heroic Fantasy". Paper Mayhem. No. 23. p. 24.
- Townsend, Jim (1988). "The PBM Corner". White Wolf Magazine. No. 11. p. 20.
- "Victory! The Battle for Europe". Rolling Thunder Games, Inc.
- Viduka, Allen G. (March–April 1997). "War Without a Face – The Privacy Option in Victory!". Paper Mayhem. No. 83. pp. 34–36.
- Viduka, Allen (May–June 1996). "The Contradictions, Fallacies & Drawbacks of the Game of Victory!". Paper Mayhem. No. 78. pp. 4–6.
- Viduka, Allen (September–October 1996). "The Moroccan Turkey Shoot – A Historical Account from Game #22 of Victory!". Paper Mayhem. No. 80. pp. 16–20.
- "Where We're Heading: Best PBM Games of 1995". Paper Mayhem. No. 77. March–April 1996. p. 2.
