= Attack Vector: Tactical =

Tabletop game

- Attack Vector: Tactical Cover Art
- Designers: Ken Burnside, Eric Finley, Tony Valle
- Publishers: Ad Astra Games
- Players: 2 or more
- Setup time: Fast
- Playing time: 1.5 to 4 hours
- Chance: Dice rolling
- Age range: 12+
- Skills: Strategy, Tactics, Mathematics^{1}
- ^{1} All the tricky math is in rule sidebars and hidden in the play aids, keeping the math required at an elementary school level.

Attack Vector: Tactical (AV:T) is a space combat wargame published by Ad Astra Games. The game is consciously designed to model comparatively realistic space combat and eschew common conventions of space warfare. Attack Vector: Tactical is set in the "Ten Worlds," a region of space expanded ten parsecs from Sol.

Some factors, unusual to the genre of space combat games, that AV:T includes:

- Energy inputs, thermodynamic efficiencies, wavelengths and focal array sizes of beam weapons.
- The thermodynamic problems of power generation and heat dissipation for closed-loop coolant reactors on spaceships.
- Specific impulse ($I_{sp}$) and propellant mass fraction of the fusion torches used to power the drive. While the fusion torch in AV:T, with its high Isp (around 100,000 seconds) and thrusts measured in 125 milligee increments are decidedly speculative, they are considerably more conservative than is common in reaction drives in science fiction. (They are probably off by merely an order of magnitude, rather than several orders of magnitude, for example.)
- Thrust is continuous over time, tracking displacement, and even tracking changes in maximum acceleration due to reduction of the ship's mass from spending fuel.
- Stealth is impossible due to the high energy output of the engines, allowing all players to see the location of the space ships of all other players. Speed of light propagation is not modeled since the players are within a few light minutes of each other.

Beyond its physics model, it is notable for being one of the few wargames that attempts true three dimensional movement. While prior attempts (BattleFleet Mars) have been made, most have failed in playability.

AV:T handles three dimensionality with several play aids, such as the Attitude/Vector Information Display (AVID), which is a color-coded polar projection of a sphere fixed relative to the hexmap handling sighting angles and ship orientation for thrust, the Range/Angle Lookup Table (RALT), which is a table of the Pythagorean Theorem that's been color-coded to reflect bearing angles used by the AVID, and tilt blocks, box miniatures and stacking tiles for on-map display of ship orientation.

== Ten Worlds Universe ==
The Ten Worlds universe is designed around a hard science fiction paradigm. There are no alien civilizations. All technology present is at the very least currently feasible, with the singular exception of FTL travel. Though its presence is acknowledged to permit extra-solar settings, it is limited to a degree rare to the genre.

Normal space travel is realistic, meaning travel between planets is a matter of months or even years, not hours. FTL is only possible from a single point in any given star system (within a quarter AU of its sun), making it as much a destination to be reached as it is a means of reaching a destination. Different sets of routes each require a specific variation of the device, limiting the effective range of any given interstellar craft. Each use of the device must be planned well in advance of a pre-decided time, meaning one cannot use it to quickly escape from combat. All these factors combine to eliminate its effect on gameplay, making it similar to the Alderson Drive of Jerry Pournelle's CoDominium Universe.

== Reception ==
The game itself won the Origins Award in 2004 for "Best Miniatures Game".
