= Fall of Rome (play-by-mail game) =

Play-by-mail game

- Publishers: Enlightened Age Entertainment
- Years active: 2004-
- Genres: play-by-mail, wargame
- Languages: English
- Systems: web-based interface
- Players: 12
- Playing time: 24 turns, closed ended
- Materials required: Instructions, order sheets, turn results, paper, pencil
- Media type: Play-by-mail

Fall of Rome is a play-by-mail strategy wargame that was published by Enlightened Age Entertainment. Set in the period after Roman times, it involved covert action and combat. The game won the Origins Award for Best Play-By-Mail Game of 2004.

== Development ==
Fall of Rome is a closed-ended, computer-moderated turn-based game with a web interface (Note: Some PBM game producers are calling PBM games turn-based games.) Rick McDowell, previous publisher of Alamaze, designed the game. After assembling a design team, McDowell led the game's development effort to address the lack of "multi-player, turn-based strategy games". Playtesting was completed in 2004. The game launched in the same year.

The publisher researched aspects of gameplay from various sources, including The History of the Decline and Fall of the Roman Empire, History of the Later Roman Empire, The Goths by Peter Heather, The Barbarian Invasions by Hans Delbrück, and other sources.

== Gameplay ==
The game setting is after the fall of the Roman Empire in the years 410 to 480 CE. Twelve players lead kingdoms during gameplay that involves covert action and combat. Gamers had use of colorful online hex maps of varying scales.

The graphical user interface was user friendly. Players had an opportunity to input orders and the game system calculated results every three days. Games lasted 24 turns. This equated to about two months. Players selected victory conditions related to conquest, development, and other factors.

Economics was a key element of gameplay. Players could advance economically through conquest or position improvement (development). Players could conduct diplomacy by email or by a message board within the game.

== Reception ==
Rick Ghan reviewed the game in the October–November 2004 issue of Flagship magazine. He praised it for its excitement and detail, stating that "Fall of Rome is a thrilling and complex strategy game sure to challenge the most avid gamer." Bob McLain, founding editor of Gaming Universal, reviewed the game in a 2005 issue of Flagship, saying it was one of the rare PBM games that he would play more than once. The Wargamer wrote: "In sum, I give Fall of Rome my heartiest recommendation; it really is Something Special."

Fall of Rome won the Origins Award for Best Play-By-Mail Game of 2004.

== See also ==
- List of play-by-mail games

== Bibliography ==
- Editors (October–November 2004). "Newsdesk PBM: Wargames" (PDF). Flagship. No. 110. p. 5.
- Ghan, Rick (October–November 2004). "Fall of Rome" (PDF). Flagship. No. 110. pp. 26–28.
- McLain, Bob (April–May 2005). "Fall of Rome: Colour in the Dark Ages". Flagship. No. 113. pp. 23–25.
- "Origins Award winners (2004)". Academy of Adventure Gaming Arts & Design. Archived from the original on 2008-06-03.
- Vor, Ry (December 2004 – January 2005). "Opening Strategy in Fall of Rome" (PDF). Flagship. No. 111. pp. 22–23.

== External sources ==
- Mosteller, Charles (27 January 2023). "A Review of Fall of Rome". pbm.net.
