= Harlequin Games =

UK play-by-mail game company

- Company type: Private
- Industry: Play-by-mail game moderator
- Founded: 1994
- Headquarters: Cardiff, UK
- Key people: Sam Roads
- Products: Legends (PBM); Saturnalia (PBM)
- Website: harlequingames.com

Harlequin Games is a business which designs and moderates PBM games by email of which their Legends (PBM) engine is the most recognized. From their "About Us " page - "We fuse wild imagination with good game-play in everything we produce and do so with professionalism and love for the hobby. Established in 1994, Harlequin has quickly grown into one of the largest postal/email gaming firms in the world, and we look forward to maintaining a long and happy relationship with our players."

Harlequin Games was winner of the Gamers' Choice Origins Award in 2004 for the play by email game Legends (PBM).

== List of games ==
- North Island Campaign
- Twilight Crusade
- Immortals Realm
- Swords of Pelarn
- Adventures in Avalon
- Crown of Chaos
- The One Ring
- Blood Tides Rising
