= The Next Empire =

Play-by-mail space combat game

- Publishers: Cyborg Games, Reality Simulations, Inc.
- Years active: 1988–unknown
- Genres: wargame, science fiction, play-by-mail
- Languages: English
- Playing time: Fixed
- Materials required: Instructions, order sheets, turn results, paper, pencil
- Media type: Play-by-mail or email

The Next Empire (or TNE) is a closed-end, computer moderated, space-based play-by-mail (PBM) wargame.

== History and development ==
The Next Empire, or TNE, was a closed-ended, computer-moderated, space-based play-by-mail wargame published by Cyborg Games. It was introduced at the 1988 Origins Awards. By 1998, the publisher had changed to Reality Simulations, Inc., which was using the original ruleset but planning a revision. Turn costs were relatively high at $11.75.

== Gameplay ==
The game's purpose is to control all starbases. Each game comprised 21 players. Gameplay occurs on a 40 × 33 hex map, with each hex comprising multiple parsecs—a total of 25,080.

Beginning with a single starbase, players chose from 21 available races and created fleets of custom-made or captured ships. Games lasted about a year. Ships were customizable in size and equipped systems with sizes from 8 to 24 and 20 available lethal and non-lethal systems.

== Reception ==
Darren Anderson reviewed the game in a 1989 issue of Paper Mayhem, praising its value for money and saying, "I highly recommend TNE for both novice and veteran garners alike". Also in 1989, Stewart Wieck reviewed The Next Empire in White Wolf. He rated the game 3 points out of 5 for Diplomacy, a 4 for Moderation and Strategy, and a 5 in Materials. Overall, he rated it 4 out of 5 points.

Stephen B. Marte reviewed the game in a 1990 issue of American Gamer. He stated that it was a "fun, quick paced, well thought out tactical simulation". The Next Empire took 2nd place in Paper Mayhem's Best PBM Game of 1990 list behind Legends in 1st place. Stacey Maust reviewed the game in 1998, rating it a 3 out of 5 for the company (RSI) and Value, a 3.5 for Politics, a 4 for Playability, a 4/5 for Frustration/Excitement, and a 5 for the Map.

== See also ==
- List of play-by-mail games

== Bibliography ==
- Anderson, Darren (November–December 1989). "The Next Empire: Carving an Empire: Part 1". Paper Mayhem. No. 39. pp. 12–14.
- Editors (November–December 1990). "Best PBM Game of 1990". Paper Mayhem. No. 45. p. 2.
- Marte, Stephen B. (July–August 1990). "Play By Play – The Next Empire". American Gamer. No. 1. pp. 28–35.
- Maust, Stacy (May–June 1998). "The Next Empire II: The Next Generation". Paper Mayhem. No. 53. pp. 6–10.
- Wieck, Stewart (June–July 1989). "PBM Game Reviews: The Next Empire". White Wolf. No. 16. pp. 13–14.
