= Continental Rails =

Play-by-mail game

- Other names: Continental Rails II
- Designers: John Van De Graaf, Laurie Van De Graaf
- Publishers: Graaf Simulations (US), AustWiz (AUS), Sloth Enterprises (UK)
- Publication: 1987; 39 years ago
- Genres: play-by-mail
- Languages: English
- Systems: computer-moderated
- Players: 15
- Playing time: 25 turns
- Materials required: Instructions, order sheets, turn results, paper, pencil
- Media type: Play-by-mail or email
- Website: https://epistoludisme.com/en/cr/index.php

Continental Rails is a closed-end, computer moderated, play-by-mail (PBM) railroad game. Published in 1987 by Graaf Simulations, it was eventually licensed overseas in the United Kingdom and Australia. As of 2023, Epistoludisme & Cie publishes the game as the revised Continental Rails II.

15 players per game vie as rail moguls in the United States between the years 1840 and 1890. The game comprises two periods separated by the American Civil War, with focus on the east coast and then the west coast in respective periods.

== History and development ==
The game was published by Graaf Simulations and designed by John and Laurie Van De Graaf. It is closed-ended and computer moderated. It was launched in 1987. By 1989, Sloth Enterprises was running the game in the United Kingdom, AustWiz in Australia and PeterStevens Postspiele in Germany. By 1998, Graaf Simulations had published Continental Rails II. As of 2023, Epistoludisme & Cie is the publisher.

== Gameplay ==
The setting is the United States in the 19th century during the growth of railroads. 15 players per game assume the role of a railroad executive. Intrigue can be employed. Diplomacy is a key aspect of gameplay.

The period of play is the 1840s to the 1880s. In the first phase of the game, before the American Civil War, players begin on the east coast of the United States and acquire companies to develop railroads and make key connections. The second phase is after the Civil War, when play shifts westward with players attempting to make a coast-to-coast connection. Stock market interaction occurs throughout the game.

The game's purpose was to achieve the most victory points. These could be obtained by a high net worth, leading a railroad, expansion, creating rail connections, and a combination of the other categories. Each game has a winner in each category.

The game takes no more than 25 turns to finish.

== Reception ==
Steve Estvanik reviewed the game in the Winter 1987 issue of Flagship. He called it "a fun game".

Stewart Wieck reviewed Continental Rails in White Wolf #16 (June/July, 1989), rating it a 4 out of 5 and stated that "While a little tricky at first, the rules of this game can be mastered with a little attention, though the game itself will always bring heartache as well as successes."

In the August–September 1990 issue of Challenge, reviewer Julia Martin thought that the game would resonate with Rail Baron or Empire Builder players. She advised that, except for a few drawbacks, she "strongly recommend[ed] Continental Rails as a good game and a lot of fun".

== See also ==
- List of play-by-mail games

== Bibliography ==
- Estvanik, Steve (Winter 1987). "Reviews: Continental Rails". Flagship. No. 17. pp. 32–33.
- Estvanik, Steve (Spring 1989). "Continental Rails". Flagship. No. 21. pp. 7–8.
- Fast, Byron (August 1990). "Continental Rails for Beginners". Flagship. No. 27. pp. 9–10.
- Greenwood, Kyle (May–June 1998). "Continental Rails II". Paper Mayhem. No. 90. pp. 12–14.
- Martin, Julia (August–September 1990). "Reviews: Continental Rails". Challenge (game magazine). No. 45. pp. 91–92.
