= World Conquest (play-by-mail game) =

Play-by-mail wargame

- Publishers: Prime Time Simulations
- Years active: 1988 to post-1993
- Genres: WWII combat
- Languages: English
- Systems: Computer-moderated
- Players: 12
- Playing time: Fixed
- Materials required: Instructions, order sheets, turn results, paper, pencil
- Media type: Play-by-mail

World conquest was a play by mail wargame published for play in 1988 by Prime Time Simulations. It was an "operational level game of land, sea and air warfare".

== Development ==
Prime Time Simulations published the game in 1988. By 1992, the publisher had released its successor, Modern World Conquest, while World Conquest was still active.

== Gameplay ==
World Conquest was a "fast paced simulation of combined arms conflict." Each game comprised 12 players in a World War II setting, with players governing a nation on a 50×60 grid map with 30 types of available combat units. The object of the game was to "be the first player to capture twelve cities and hold them for one full turn". The game allowed players to choose strategies such as: land-based, sea-based, air-based, technology research-focused, and others.

Players began in their capital cities which were at the center of their territories. As these territories were unmapped, exploration was a central part of early play, in order to capture neutral cities. The primary element of gameplay was the unit, of which there were thirty types. Players could produce units with "buildsteps" generated by cities or villages, all of which produced different numbers of buildsteps. (Note: Capital cities produced six buildsteps, neutral cities produced four or five, and villages produced between zero and three.) Unit costs ranged from two at the low end to twenty for battleships at the top end, while most units cost between two and six. Other unit types included: artillery, basic infantry, fighters, mechanized infantry, paratroopers, rocket, special forces, and tanks. Each unit had an experience level from green, trained, veteran, crack, to elite.

Turns were divided into five phases, during which players accounted for a number of variables when moving and conducting combat operations. Combat could be a fairly simple affair between two units or it could be a "highly complex and mind-boggling affair" with multiple players and unit types involved on a single game square.

== Reception ==
In 1991, reviewer Mark Macagnone stated in Paper Mayhem magazine that the game was "good, with a little more effort it can be great!" In the same issue, Randall E. Black also reviewed the game, stating that he "really enjoyed the game, and felt it gave great value for the money." Out of a possible 5, he rated the game a 4 for its rule book and enjoyment, 5 for dollar value and gamemaster response, and 3 for playability, while placing its complexity in the medium to complex range. Reviewer Jack Herriman II said in 1993 that World Conquest was "made for inventive people" in that it allowed many different possibilities for force generation to pursue campaigns. The game was listed as the #9 of 84 play-by-mail games in the Sep/Oct 1992 issue of Paper Mayhem magazine, and was listed in the same issue as the #1 play-by-mail game for games with over 100 voting responses.

== See also ==
- List of play-by-mail games
- Paper Mayhem
- Play-by-mail game

== Bibliography ==
- Black, Randall E. (May–June 1992). "World Conquest Game Review". Paper Mayhem. No. 54. p. 19–20.
- Herriman II, Jack (Jan–Feb 1993). "World Conquest via Combined Arms". Paper Mayhem. No. 58. pp. 20–23.
- Macagnone, Mark (Nov–Dec 1991). "World Conquest". Paper Mayhem. No. 51. pp. 11–17.
- Milliken, Chris; Hart, Steven (Jan 1992). "Beginner's Guide to Modern World Conquest". Flagship. No. 35 (UK ed.). pp. 29–30.
- Palmer, Nicky (January 1992). "World Conquest Diary, Part 4: Bloodbath at Freiburg". Flagship. No. 35 (UK ed.). pp. 32–33.
- Palmer, Nicky (March 1992). "World Conquest Diary: The Jaws of Defeat". Flagship. No. 35 (US ed.). pp. 32–33.
- Paper Mayhem (Sep–Oct 1992). "PBM Game Ratings as of 07-20-92". Paper Mayhem. No. 56. p. 52.
- Prime Time Simulations (May–June 1992). "World Conquest (Advertisement)". Paper Mayhem. No. 54. p. 15.
- Rapp, Bill (May–June 1992). "World Conquest, Comments, and Possibly, a Rebuttal?". Paper Mayhem. No. 54. p. 18.
