= Saturnalia (play-by-mail game) =

Fantasy play-by-mail game

- The Saturnalia graphic used by Sloth Enterprises
- Other names: Sat
- Designers: Neil Packer and Simon Letts
- Publishers: Sloth Enterprises
- Years active: 1983–2002 or later
- Genres: sword and sorcery, play-by-mail
- Languages: English
- Playing time: Fixed
- Materials required: Instructions, order sheets, turn results, paper, pencil
- Media type: Play-by-mail or email

Saturnalia (or Sat) is a play by mail (PBM) game with a fantasy setting that was first played by students at the University of Southampton before becoming a commercial enterprise in the United Kingdom.

== Publication history ==
Saturnalia was one of the first single-character fantasy, sword and sorcery PBM role-playing games. Neil Packer and Simon Letts designed the game. Also known as Sat, Saturnalia was hand moderated. Turn results in 1985 comprised an A4-sized page of small handwriting, with shorter or longer results resulting in adjusted turn fees.

In 1987, Sloth Enterprises was formed to moderate a commercial version of the game. In an advertisement in the October 1986 issue of Adventurer, Sloth Enterprises asserted that Saturnalia currently had a subscriber base of over 700 players, making it the largest single-player PBM game in the U.K. By 1997, the game had been running for twenty years.

Linda Little commented in the inaugural issue of Games International that Saturnalia and other early fantasy PBMs were based on table-top RPGs such as Dungeons & Dragons "in which the norm is to play a single adventurer trying to make his or her way in a pretty harsh world. The worlds in question tended to be low-tech with mythical beasts and various sentient races." A reviewer in 1985 also likened the game to Dungeons & Dragons.

By 1997, the original two gamemasters (the game designers) had expanded to five, running six different "regions" within Saturnalia. (Note: Colin Andrews and Neil Packer were two of the gamemasters.) These included "Neil's Area", run by Neil Packer, "Exile" run by John Davies, "North West" run by Colin Andrews, "Shyrley's Area", and "Simon's Area". Andrews also ran a North East region. In 2002, Dark Wolf Games published the game in the United Kingdom.

== Gameplay ==
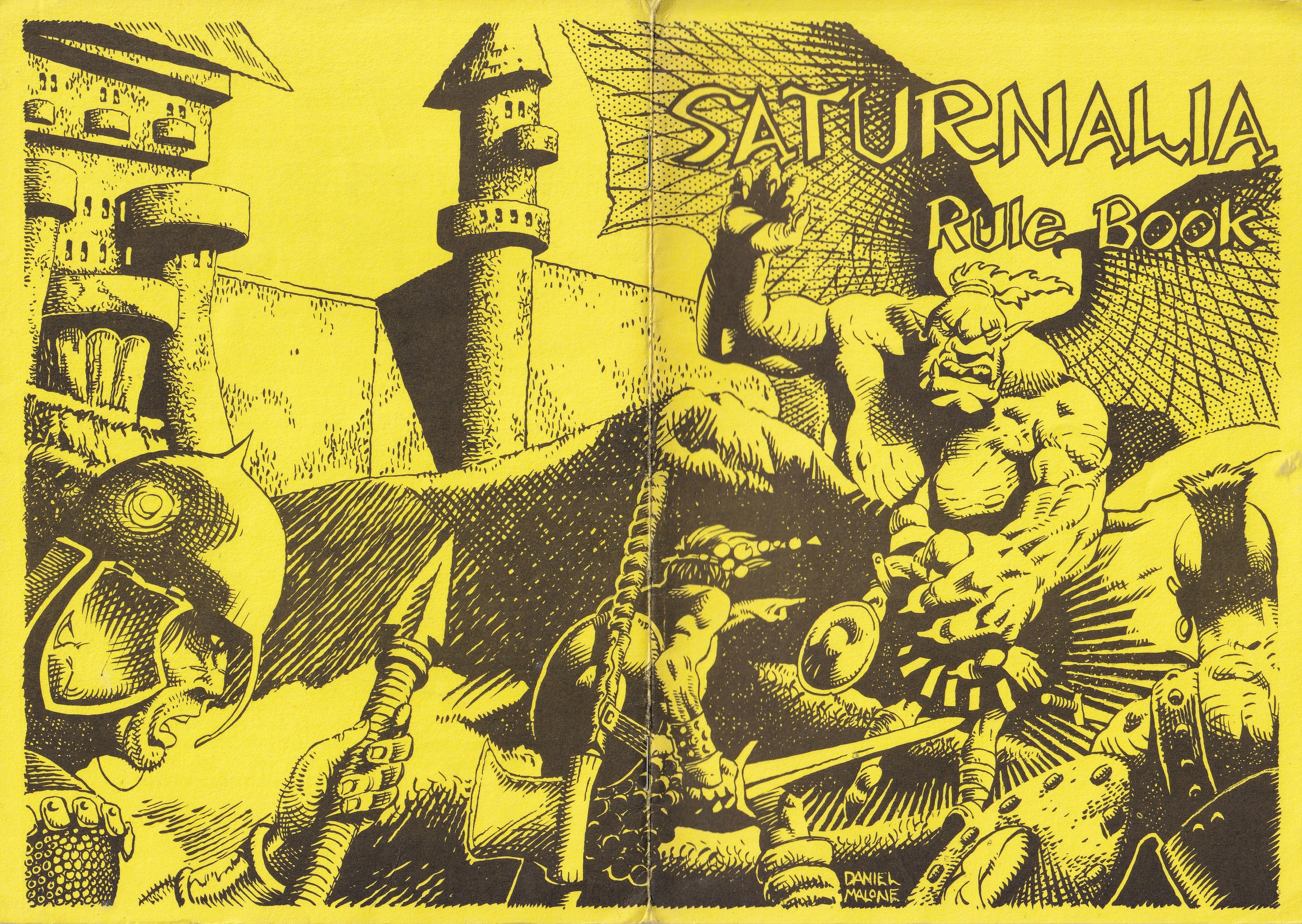
Saturnalia Rulebook 1984

The game is set on the continent of Saturnalia, which has a variety of climates and a large cast of mythical creatures. The rule book recommends that the character should be a follower of one of the fourteen deities — each gives the character some advantages, and allows the character to learn certain types of spells.

The player distributes 250 points amongst combat, magical, vitality, scouting and perception, and then chooses the character's appearance and background. During the game, abilities will rise and fall with use or neglect, and the character's description might also change depending on interaction with others. Each character also starts with a Fame rating of zero, which will rise or fall depending on the character's deeds or crimes.

The gamemaster arbitrates the outcome of combats, using variables such as relevant abilities, magic, and terrain. Players could achieve inclusion in the Top Ten Hall of Fame with a high score in fame or infamy.

== Reception ==
In a 1985 issue of Flagship, Ben Parkinson stated that it was "probably one of the best purely role-playing postal games on the market".

Wayne Elusive reviewed Saturnalia for Adventurer magazine and stated that "I find the GM descriptions, atmosphere and quality of a high standard. There is also a regular monthly newsletter, plenty of "sati-meets" (where players get together, drink lots of beer and swap information), lots of organisations to join and of course, all the entertaining players' messages that you receive."

In the July 1987 edition of Crash, Brendon Kavanagh admitted that "Saturnalia has no really original features — in fact, as fantasy games go, it has little special about it at all." Despite this Kavanagh concluded "Saturnalia is a simple but enjoyable game to play. Sloth Enterprises have run this multi-player game successfully for nearly two years now without any major problems that immediately spring to mind. [...] If you enjoy role-playing games, you may well enjoy Saturnalia."

== Reviews ==
- G.M. The Independent Fantasy Roleplaying Magazine #1

== See also ==
- List of play-by-mail games

== Bibliography ==
- Dark Wolf Games (December 2002 – January 2003). "Saturnalia [Ad]". Flagship. No. 100. p. Back cover.
- Ives, Simon (July–August 1997). "A Saturnalian Diary, Part 1". Flagship. No. 68. pp. 30–31.
- Kavanagh, Brett (July 1987). "Play by Mail". Crash. No. 36.
- Little, Linda (October 1988). "P.B.M.". Games International. No. 1. p. 49.
- Parkinson, Ben (Autumn 1985). "Saturnalia: Role-Playing Towards the Hall of Fame". Flagship. No. 8. pp. 10–11.
- "Saturnalia". Adventurer. No. 4. October 1986. p. 3.
- Wayne (January–February 1997). "The New Look of Saturnalia". Flagship. No. 65. pp. 37–38.
- Wayne (January–February 1997). "Rumours from the Front: Saturnalia". Flagship. No. 65. p. 27.
- Wayne (September 1997). "Talking Shop: Saturnalia (Exile)". Games Without Frontiers. No. 3. p. 42.
