= The Tribes of Crane =

Human-moderated play-by-mail game

- Publishers: Schubel & Son, Northwest Simulations
- Years active: 1978 to unknown
- Genres: science fiction
- Languages: English
- Playing time: unlimited
- Materials required: Instructions, order sheets, turn results, paper, pencil
- Media type: Play-by-mail or email

The Tribes of Crane is a play-by-mail game that was published by Schubel & Son. The game was launched in 1978.

== History and development ==
According to the publisher, Schubel & Son, the game was launched in 1978. By 1982 there were 2,200 players.

== Gameplay ==
The Tribes of Crane was a turn-based game where players took on the role of leader of a tribe on the planet of Crane, and attempted to accumulate warriors, gold, and other resources. It was the first commercial play-by-mail game that was moderated by a human game master instead of a computer, although later the game master was assisted by a computer.

A new player started by picking what type of tribe they wished to lead (herdsmen, warriors, merchants or sea people), and what type of climate and terrain they wanted to start in. The player would then be sent details of how many people and livestock were in the tribe.

The player would mail a monthly turn, which consisted of a movement or stand-in-place order, a combat order, a transaction order, and any special orders. Special orders were unusual for play-by-mail games, which were often moderated by a computer. As reviewer Jeff Neufeld noted, "Properly utilized, this is the best part of the game... What can be done here is virtually unlimited. For instance, you can push development of a better crossbow, or breed faster horses. The big advantage of having a [human] gamesmaster is that he can decide on the feasibility of new ideas."

Knowledge of the world and other tribes was gained through moving from place to place, meeting other tribes and trading knowledge, or asking questions of the game master.

There were up to 1200 players in each game, using a large map with 4600 sectors, 100 cities, and over a thousand non-player characters.

When The Tribes of Crane began, the cost was $1 to join a game, and $1.50 for each monthly turn, with unlimited special orders. After several years, the number of turns increased to two per month, and the cost rose to $2.50 per turn. A charge of $1 per turn for special orders was also initiated, increasing the possible monthly cost for two turns to $7.

== Publication history ==
Shannon Appelcline noted that games like Tribes of Crane were competitive with the PBM games from Flying Buffalo for a period of time, but that Flying Buffalo outlasted its competitors. In 1993, Schubel & Son sold all games and licenses to Northwest Simulations.

== Reception ==
In the June 1979 edition of Dragon (Issue 26), Jeff Neufeld lauded the human gamemaster, the addition of special orders, and the gamemasters' habit of sending a self-addressed stamped envelope when replying to a player's turn. His one disappointment was the lack of interaction with other players, but overall, he believed that "Tribes of Crane is an excellent game and worth every penny it costs to play.

However, in the July 1980 issue of The Space Gamer (Issue 29), Forrest Johnson disagreed that a human gamemaster was necessarily a good thing, noting: "[It] is the largest open-ended correspondence game around. But how open is it when an inexperienced GM appraises your turn, so that a sophisticated special action comes back marked simple 'noted,' or ignored altogether? How open is it when a different GM handles every turn, so the elaborate preparations of a previous turn are forgotten? The more involved a player is in Crane, the more frustrated he becomes."

In the April 1983 edition of Dragon (Issue 72), Michael Gray stated: "This is a long-running, well-established game. If you are very creative, you can enjoy it for a long time."

In the July 1983 edition of White Dwarf (Issue #43), Trevor Graver liked the enjoyment that came from: "discovering things. The amount of information one can acquire about Crane is staggering, information on anything from city life, through to details on an obscure religion all come together to paint a brilliant fantasy." However, Graver did warn about the high cost of play: "Many prospective [Play-by-Mailers] flinch when they compare the cost of playing the game for a year, with say, the cost of the AD&D works." However, Graver concluded: "Tribes of Crane is well worth playing, and could very easily become an obsession."

Brian Creese reviewed The Tribes of Crane for Imagine magazine, and stated that "[the playtester] found that quite a lot of work was necessary to start the game".

In The Space Gamer 1979 Game Survey, readers rated Tribes of Crane 6.4 out of 9.

== See also ==
- List of play-by-mail games
- Star Venture

== Bibliography ==
- Johnson, Forrest (July 1980). "Featured Review: Farewell to Crane". The Space Gamer. No. 29. Steve Jackson Games. p. 17.
- McCarthy, William (Winter 1983). "The Singers of Crane". Flagship. No. 1. p. 21.
- Olson, Gerald D. (Winter 1983). "Tribes of Crane: The Neverending Game". Paper Mayhem. No. 30. p. 39.
- Steadman, Chris (Spring 1984). "Directions for New Crane Operators". Flagship. No. 2. pp. 14–15.
- Townsend, Jim. "The PBM Corner". White Wolf Magazine. No. 11. p. 20.
