= Supernova II =

Play-by-mail space combat game

- Other names: SuperNova II
- Designers: Peter Donnan and Russel Norris
- Publishers: Rolling Thunder Games
- Years active: 1989 to unknown
- Genres: science fiction, play-by-mail
- Languages: English
- Playing time: Fixed
- Materials required: Instructions, order sheets, turn results, paper, pencil
- Media type: Play-by-mail or email

Supernova II (or SuperNova II) is a computer moderated, play-by-mail (PBM) game of space conflict.

== History and development ==
Supernova II was a play-by-mail game of space conflict designed by Peter Donnan and Russel Norris and published by Rolling Thunder Games. Flagship editor Tim Sullivan called it a "sophisticated space opera". It was released in the U.S. and UK in February and August 1989, respectively. It improved on their initial offering of Supernova. Supernova II was computer moderated, an update from Supernova's hand-moderation. By 2004, Rolling Thunder Games released Supernova III.

== Gameplay ==
Players custom designed ships for assignment in fleets which could take offensive or defensive actions. Twelve ship types were available. These included: Colonial Transports, Destroyers, Escort Carriers, Explorers, Fast Freighters, Fleet Scouts, Frigates, Heavy Freighters, Heavy Troop Transports, Light Cruisers, Star Destroyers, and Troop Transports. Players selected a race to play as well, a consequential choice for gameplay.

According to Wayne Mohan, "SuperNova is the Commando unit, a small, elite band of your finest" which can explore or accomplish other tasks. Intrigue and diplomacy were elements of gameplay. Both combat between ships and ground combat were possible.

Gameplay in Supernova II was challenging and careful play in the first eight months was critical to success. The editors of Flagship stated that it was "one of the hardest games to play well from turn 1". Rick McFarland put its complexity just below games like Empyrean Challenge.

== Reception ==
A reviewer in the September–October 1987 issue of Paper Mayhem highly recommended Supernova II, stating it was "an improvement over the original in almost every area". He noted that combat played a greater role and gameplay was challenging. As of November 1989, Supernova II was the highest rated game of 53 listed PBM games in Paper Mayhem. (Note: Games were rated on "playability, design, ease of understanding the rules, and ease of understanding game printouts" with Supernova II scoring 7.732 out of 9 points from 60 registered votes.) In the November–December 1989 issue of Paper Mayhem, Supernova II took 1st place in the Best PBM Game of 1989 list. The game also took 1st place in the magazine's Best PBM Game of 1989 list.

== See also ==
- List of play-by-mail games

== Bibliography ==
- Bunker, Robert J. (January–February 1988). "Empire Management – A Survival Guide for Supernova II". Paper Mayhem. No. 28. pp. 24–27.
- Bunker, Robert J. (March–April 1988). "Death Machine Alliance Formation in Supernova II". Paper Mayhem. No. 29. pp. 27–29.
- Burlingame, Martin (February–March 2004). "Supernova III: A Pirate's Viewpoint". Flagship. No. 106. pp. 10–11.
- Editors (November–December 1989). "Best PBM Game of 1988". Paper Mayhem. No. 40. p. 2.
- Editors (January–February 1990). "Best PBM Game of 1989". Paper Mayhem. No. 40. p. 2.
- Editors (January–February 1990). "Best PBM Game Ratings as of 11-12-89". Paper Mayhem. No. 40. p. 23.
- Mohan, Wayne (September–October 1987). "Supernova II: More Guts, More Glory". Paper Mayhem. No. 26. pp. 8–10.
- Mohan, Wayne (September–October 1989). "Supernova II: (Upgrade), The Early Strategy and Exploits of a Seeker Review Position in the New Star Region of Rigel". Paper Mayhem. No. 38. pp. 6–11.
- Mohan, Wayne (November–December 1989). "Supernova II Continued". Paper Mayhem. No. 39. pp. 16–19.
- Sullivan, Tim (February–March 1988). "From the Helm: Supernova II". The D2 Report. No. 30. p. 30.
