= Schubel & Son =

Play-by-mail company

- Company type: Play-by-mail
- Founded: October 4, 1974
- Headquarters: Sacramento, CA
- Key people: George Valintine Schubel, Sr. George Vernon Schubel, Jr.
- Products: The Tribes of Crane, Starmaster, Global Supremacy

Schubel & Son was a hobby and gaming company that published play-by-mail (PBM) games. The company began in 1974 and expanded to large-scale PBM games in August 1978. It also published the game The Tribes of Crane in 1978, followed by StarMaster in 1980 and Global Supremacy in 1982.

== History ==
Schubel & Son opened for business on October 4, 1974 in Sacramento, California. For the first few years, the company worked in science hobby supply. They began in the PBM field in 1974 and began moderating large-scale PBM games in August 1978 with the game The Tribes of Crane. The company stated that it proved very popular in the initial months of play and enrollment quickly expanded. They later published StarMaster in 1980 and Global Supremacy in 1982. Both of these were human-moderated PBM games. In the September–October 1983 issue of The Space Gamer, the company announced that they had merged with Venture Management Consulting, becoming Schubel & Son Inc.

In 1984, the company had computer equipment of the period. This included a "PCE Systems Voyager II" with 500 kilobytes of RAM, four printers (two of which were dot matrix), as well as two hard discs of 20 and 40 megabytes with two 8-inch floppy disks. The company used Microsoft Basic-80 5.21 and Bascom Compiler 5.24.

George V. Schubel, in a letter to W.G. Armintrout of The Space Gamer magazine, stated that the company had heard of StarMaster positions "selling in the $700.00 range" by September 21, 1983. In 1990, the company stated that Global Supremacy III was their largest and most successful game.

In the May–June 1984 issue of The Space Gamer, the editor, Christopher Frink, addressing a previous controversial letter about Schubel & Son printed in an earlier issue, devoted an entire entry of the "Keeping Posted" PBM column to expanding on the controversy. In the column, he printed additional letters from players who had negative experiences with Schubel & Son, balanced by letters from players who had positive experiences with the company, some provided from George Schubel as a response to the negative letters.

In the March–April 1993 issue of Paper Mayhem magazine, the company announced that they had concluded an agreement with Northwest Simulations for the sale of their games, license contracts and most office equipment. The announcement noted that "George and Patty Schubel of Schubel & Son Inc. are planning to run one game of Global Supremacy in retirement in a license arrangement through Northwest Simulations."

== Fee structure ==
Various observers noted that Schubel & Son had a relatively high fee structure in the industry. Stefan Jones, in the September–October 1983 issue of The Space Gamer, said that many starting Starmaster players, or those who "order the rulebook out of curiosity, are put off by the 'hidden' turn fees". Reviewer Bill Flad, in the November/December 1986 issue of Paper Mayhem magazine, reviewed the game Company Commander, pointing to the high cost, and noting that Schubel & Son even forewarned players of the high expense. He provided examples at the time from gameplay where he was charged $21 for being attacked by another player and a friend who spent $65 on a single complicated turn. (Note: Mark Hill of Wired Magazine, stated in June 2021 that, "gamers have hated pay-to-win mechanics since the 1970s, when serious players of Tribes of Crane dropped hundreds of dollars on turns".)

== Published games ==
- Alien Conflict
- Alien Invasion
- Arena Combat
- Ancient Empires
- Catacombs of Chaos
- Company Commander
- Computer Boxing
- Conquest of the Stars
- Crusade
- Fog of War
- Gallic Wars
- Global Supremacy
- Global Supremacy III
- Horizon's End
- Kings War
- Masters of Magic
- Robot Armies
- Siege America
- Star Venture
- StarMaster
- StarMaster II
- Strategic Conflict
- The Tribes of Crane
- Vietnam
- War 1940
- War of 1812

== See also ==
- Adventures by Mail
- Flagship magazine
- List of play-by-mail games
- Paper Mayhem magazine

== Bibliography ==
- Armintrout, W.G. (November 1982). "The Great Buffalo Hunt: Heroic Fantasy vs. Catacombs of Chaos". The Space Gamer. No. 57. pp. 2–5.
- Armintrout, W.G. (January–February 1984). "A Gentle Art: Human-Moderated PBMs". The Space Gamer. No. 67. pp. 42–43.
- "Gameline News and Updates". Paper Mayhem. No. 6. May–June 1984. pp. 18–20.
- "Gameline". Paper Mayhem. No. 59. March–April 1993. pp. 22–27.
- Flad, Bill (November–December 1986). "Review of Company Commander". Paper Mayhem. No. 21. pp. 14–16.
- Frink, Christopher (May–June 1984). "A Gentle Art: The Controversy Rages". The Space Gamer. No. 69. pp. 31–33.
- Mosteller, Charles (6 January 2011). "PBM Boneyard". Archived from the original on 24 October 2021.
- Hill, Mark (June 20, 2021). "Remember When Multiplayer Gaming Needed Envelopes and Stamps?". Wired.
- Schubel, George V. (November 1980). "Company Report: Schubel & Son". The Space Gamer. No. 33. p. 16.
- "Schubel & Son, Inc". The Journal of the PBM Gamer (4th ed.). Paper Mayhem. 1990.
