= Middle-Earth Play-By-Mail =

Play-by-mail game

Middle-Earth Play-By-Mail (or Middle-earth PBM), is a turn-based, strategy play by email and play-by-mail game set in the world of The Lord of the Rings and The Hobbit, including elements from ICE's Middle-earth Role Playing under licence, now run by GSI.

== History and development ==
Middle Earth Play-By-Mail (or MEPBM) was created by Game Systems Inc. (GSI) and inspired by J.R.R. Tolkien's books The Hobbit and The Lord of the Rings.

In 2001, the game had multiple variants including ones set in the year 1650 or 2950 "War of the Ring, or the Fourth Age". There was also a "mini-module" called "Battle of the Five Armies".

== Gameplay ==
Players cooperate with teammates to control the lands of Middle-earth. Victory is achieved through a combination of military force, magic, and economic strength. Each nation has specific strengths and weaknesses.

Gameplay includes factors such as "character development, nation management, economics, diplomacy, and warfare".

There are several scenarios with smaller maps, including The Battle of Five Armies - based on The Hobbit, The Untold War based on the battles from The Lord of the Rings not focused on in the novels, focusing on Dol Guldur and Lothlórien which are only covered in the appendices, and variations on the main game, including Kin-strife and Gunboat variations.

== Reception ==
Middle-earth PBM has won a number of awards since inception. It won the Origins Award for Best New Play-by-Mail Game of 1991, and won the Origins Award for Best Play-by-Mail Game of 1992, 1995, and 1996. Middle Earth PBM won Paper Mayhem's Best PBM Game of 1993. Middle-earth PBM Fourth Age, circa 1000 won the Origins Award for Best New Play-by-Mail Game of 1997, and the Best Ongoing Play-by-Mail Game of 1998 and 1999, and Middle Earth FA 1000 won for "Best Play By Mail Game" in 2001. In 1998, the game was inducted into the Origins Award Adventure Gaming Hall of Fame.

Sam Chupp reviewed Middle-Earth PBM in White Wolf #38 (1993), rating it a 3 out of 5 and stated that "If you like Tolkien, and you have time (about two or three hours a turn) to play this PBM, I suggest that you sign up immediately, preferably with a group of friends so you can all play one side or another."

The game continued winning awards in the 21st century as well. It won the Origins Award Gamer's Choice: Best Play-by-Mail of 2003.

== See also ==
- List of play-by-mail games

== Bibliography ==
- Dobberpuhl, Jeffery (November–December 2001). "Middle Earth PBM: An in-depth Guide for Beginners" (PDF). Flagship. No. 94. pp. 10–13.
