= Fleet Maneuvers =

Play-by-mail space combat game

- Other names: 3D Fleet Maneuvers
- Publishers: Fantastic Simulations
- Years active: 1983–1993
- Genres: wargame, science fiction, play-by-mail
- Languages: English
- Players: 16
- Playing time: Fixed
- Materials required: Instructions, order sheets, turn results, paper, pencil
- Media type: Play-by-mail or email

Fleet Maneuvers (or 3D Fleet Maneuvers) is a closed-end, space-based play-by-mail (PBM) wargame.

== History and development ==
Fleet Maneuvers was a computer-moderated, closed end, space-based play-by-mail game published by Fantastic Simulations.

== Gameplay ==
The game's purpose was to score the most points from ship-to-ship combat. Games could end at 700 or 900 points, which took 10–20 turns. Players could choose from four races or factions: the Alliance, the Confederacy, the diminutive Donnz, and the warlike Krell.

Fantastic Simulations also introduced a 3D variant called The Next Dimension.

== Reception ==
Reviewer Keith Mercer, in the July–August 1987 issue of Paper Mayhem magazine stated that the game was challenging.

== See also ==
- List of play-by-mail games

== Bibliography ==
- Mercer, Keith (July–August 1987). "Fleet Maneuvers – The Original Game". Paper Mayhem. No. 25. pp. 13–14.
- Wright, B.E. (September–October 1993). "Fleet Maneuvers – A Review Part II: Firepower, Or Stealth: Tactical Simulations & Other Matters". Paper Mayhem. No. 62. pp. 18–20.
- Wright, B.E. (November–December 1993). "Fleet Maneuvers in 3D: A Review of the Next Dimension". Paper Mayhem. No. 63. pp. 6–8.
