= Legends (play-by-mail game) =

Role-playing game with a medieval setting

- Game logo
- Designers: Jim Landes
- Publishers: Midnight Games, Harlequin Games
- Years active: 1989 to current
- Genres: sword and sorcery, heroic fantasy, play-by-mail
- Languages: English
- Playing time: fixed, months to years
- Materials required: instructions, order sheets, turn results
- Media type: play-by-mail/email or web
- Website: https://www.harlequingames.com/

Legends (or Legends PBM) is a turn-based, role-playing game with a medieval setting. It is currently published in English by Harlequin Games. Jim Landes—owner of Midnight Games, the game's first publisher—began developing the game in 1984, eventually publishing it in December 1989 as a play-by-mail (PBM) game after over a year of playtesting. The initial game comprised a module and game system built on the publisher's existing game, Epic, and was run briefly as Swords of Pelarn before publication as Legends. The first of multiple game modules was Crown of Avalon, which allowed up to 200 players per game. Demand by 1991 was "incredible" according to Bruce R. Daniel in White Wolf. Games could be lengthy, initially between three and ten years of play, settling into an average of three years by 2002.

Midnight Games eventually licensed the game to other companies including Epic Games in the United States, Rhann Postal Games in the UK, PBM Associates in Australia, and others. The various publishers launched multiple subsequent modules over time, primarily fantasy-themed, but with some modules containing non-standard elements such as a Starfarer character class. The game today is run by computer.

Basic gameplay is in the sword and sorcery style. Some modules vary from this model, including military force-on-force play. Players design characters with numerous available options. All game elements are interactive, allowing players to explore, roleplay and interact with non-player characters (including monsters) and other player characters, gameplay combat on various scales, and improve their position over time. Modules vary in duration and requirements for victory.

Legends has won various awards. The Swords of Pelarn module won an Origins Award in 1995 for Best New PBM Game and The One Ring—based on the Lord of the Rings—won the Origins Award for Best PBM game in 2010. Legends won a Gamer's Choice award at Origins 2005. The game has also been voted PBM Game of the Year multiple times in the early 1990s by the readers of Paper Mayhem magazine.

== Play-by-mail genre ==
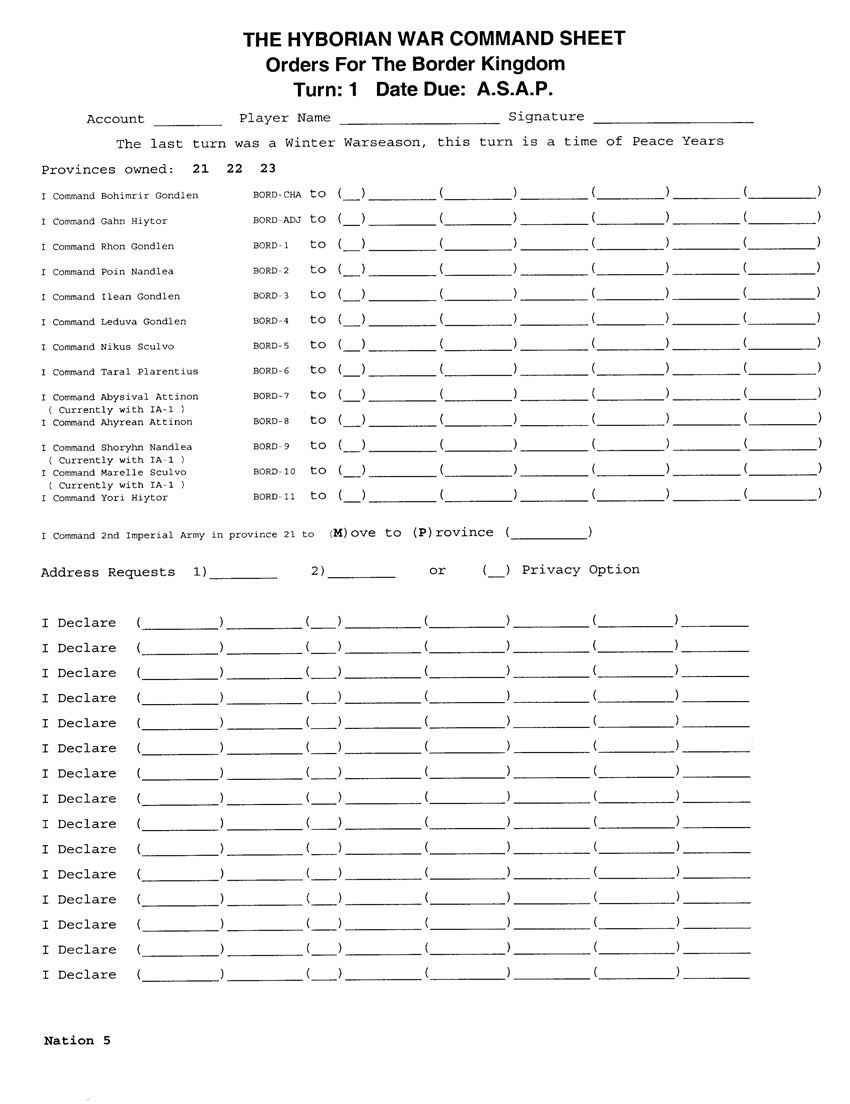
Example turn 1 order sheet for the Border Kingdom

Play-by-mail (PBM) games feature a number of differences from tabletop games. The typical PBM game involves many more players than an average tabletop game can support. (Note: For example, the PBM game It's a Crime can accommodate 110 players per game.) PBM game lengths are usually longer, depending on a number of factors. Turnaround time is how long a player has to prepare and submit "orders" (moves and changes to make in the game) and the company has to process them and send back turn results. The average turnaround time in the 1980s was two weeks, but some modern PBM games are play-by-email (PBEM) with shorter turnaround times of twice per week or faster. (Note: For example, the PBM game Covert Operations allows twice-per-week moves, daily moves, and private games where players can specify turn around times.) Open ended games allow players to strengthen their positions without end, with players continually entering and leaving the game. Examples include Heroic Fantasy and Monster Island. Conversely, closed end games typically have all players starting on equal terms, with rapid, intense, player vs. player gameplay that ends when a player or group achieves some victory condition or is unopposed. Examples include Hyborian War and It's a Crime. The complexity of PBM games can range from the relatively simple to the PBM game Empyrean Challenge, once described as "the most complex game system on Earth". (Note: Vern Holford, owner of Superior Simulations, developed Empyrean Challenge, a PBM game that reviewer Jim Townsend described in 1988 as "the most complex game system on Earth" with some turn results for large positions at 1,000 pages in length. According to Townsend, in those cases there was a significant investment in time to understand what happened on a turn as well as to fill out future turn orders. He said a player without a spreadsheet was "nearly doomed from the outset".)

Once a player has chosen a game and receives an initial game setup, gameplay begins. This generally involves players filling out order sheets for a game (see example image) and sending them to the gaming company. The company processes the turns and returns the results to the player, who completes a subsequent order sheet. Diplomacy is also frequently an important—sometimes indispensable—part of gameplay. The initial choice of a PBM game requires consideration as there is a wide array of possible roles to play, from pirates to space characters to "previously unknown creatures". Close identification with a role typically increases a player's game satisfaction. (Note: This section is taken from the Hyborian War article.)

=== History ===
Some games have long been played by mail between two players, such as chess and Go. PBM play of Diplomacy—a multiplayer game—began in 1963. The emergence of the professional PBM industry occurred less than a decade later. Rick Loomis, "generally recognized as the founder of the PBM industry", accomplished this by launching Flying Buffalo Inc. and his first PBM game, Nuclear Destruction, in 1970. Professional game moderation started in 1971 at Flying Buffalo. (Note: Flying Buffalo later added games such as Battleplan and Heroic Fantasy along with Starweb and others. By the late 1980s these games were all computer moderated.) Chris Harvey started commercial PBM play afterward in the United Kingdom with a company called ICBM through an agreement with Loomis and Flying Buffalo. ICBM, followed by KJC games and Mitregames, led the UK PBM industry. For approximately five years, Flying Buffalo was the single dominant company in the US PBM industry until Schubel & Son entered the field in about 1976 with the human-moderated The Tribes of Crane. Superior Simulations was the next significant PBM company to enter the US market. They did so in 1978 with the game Empyrean Challenge.

The early 1980s saw additional growth for PBM. The player base grew and game moderators were plentiful. The PBM industry in 1980 comprised two large companies and some small ones. The most popular games in 1980 were Starweb and Tribes of Crane. In 1981, some PBM players launched another company, Adventures by Mail, with the "immensely popular" Beyond the Stellar Empire. (Note: This section draws from portions of the History section of the Wikipedia Play-by-mail game article.)

The proliferation of PBM companies in the 1980s supported the publication of a number of newsletters from individual play-by-mail companies as well as independent publications which focused solely on the play-by-mail gaming industry such as the relatively short-lived The Nuts & Bolts of PBM and Gaming Universal. The PBM genre's two preeminent magazines of the period were Flagship and Paper Mayhem. (Note: The preceding portion of this section is taken from the Victory! The Battle for Europe article.) It was in this environment that Legends was developed and launched.

== Development ==
Legends is a turn-based, fantasy role-playing game. It was created by Jim Landes, owner of Midnight Games. The game was previously run as Swords of Pelarn. It built on Midnight Game's existing Epic game system, leveraging its rulesets and previous playtesting.

Landes began game development in 1984. The initial playtest began in March 1987 with a group of 46 players, expanded two months later to 53. Landes made significant changes from the playtest, and designed most of the game between March 1988 and May 1989, to include creating the first module Crown of Avalon. The original game system, Legends I (LI), operated by paper copy and postal mail. (Note: Turn around time ranges for modern PBM games are wide enough that PBM magazine editors now use the term "turn-based games". In 2005, Flagship noted this shift in naming because most of the games are played online.) It comprised a game system framework and the accompanying initial module. The game system had a sword and sorcery theme.

The early years saw expansion and popularity. In 1990, Midnight Games licensed Legends for play in Europe through Rhann Postal Games and Australia through PBM Associates. Demand by 1991 was "incredible" according to Bruce R. Daniel in White Wolf.

Games could be lengthy. In 1990, games were estimated to take 3–10 years to complete. The first Crown of Avalon game lasted more than five years. In 2002, the average game lasted three years, although they could go longer. By 2003, game duration averaged two to three years, and by 2007 it was between one and three years.

In 1993, Edi Birsan acquired Midnight Games. Two years later, the game was updated to the Legends II (LII) game system which included new game aspects and rules. Legends II was eventually playable by email through multiple online systems including the current Legends Position Editor (LPE). (Note: The Legends Turn Editor was the first DOS-based online turn system. The Legends Position Editor was introduced in 1998.)

In 2003, Sam Roads of the UK-based Harlequin Games acquired Legends. (Note: Legends is distributed in German by SSV Klapf-Bachler OEG, PBM Games.) The company updated the online turn editor and rules in 2005. As of 2013, players interact through an application which provides "graphical displays, data-driven dashboards, and order-writing tools" to enhance the game. Game turns are serial processed, versus simultaneous. (Note: Simultaneously processed games have turns from all players processed together according to an established sequence. In serial-processed games, turns are processed when received within the determined turn processing window.)

=== Game module overview ===
A second playtest of Crown of Avalon began in November 1989. Due to pressure on the publisher, it was published in December 1989 with games No. 1 and 2 made available for play. (Note: Games three and four were made available in January 1990.) Due to the release date, the first game was a mixture of playtesters and paid players. Midnight Games adjusted the programming and turnsheets during initial game turns.

Crown of Avalon was Sword and Sorcery themed, with plans for different themes in future modules. This module was set in the world of Avalon. The timeframe was around the 13th or 14th century. No combat was allowed in the first turns to help confirm smooth game operation and prevent early player knockouts. Players in each game were augmented by over 1,000 non-player characters. The publisher randomized characters and locations to prevent players in multiple games from gaining an advantage. Game costs depended on kingdom size, ranging from $3.50 to $13.00, the latter for a large kingdom. Turn results were 6–20 pages. However, turn results over 60 pages were not uncommon by 1991. The rules and playing materials for Crown of Avalon comprised about 230 pages. (Note: The rules comprised four books with the largest as the 120-page "General Rules of Play". There was also a 20-page game system introduction book, an 80-page game order reference, and a 12-page Crown of Avalon module.)

The second game module was Realm of the Immortals. This game took place in the world of Verana. It was a deeper and "vastly more complicated scenario" according to Dave Chappell in a 1995 issue of Flagship. The Overlord and Mercenary positions were balanced and players had a choice of 185 order types. In 1994, the editors of Flagship magazine stated that this module was "an almost pure power game". Additionally, play could continue even after interim and final victory conditions were met.

The third game module was North Island Campaign. In this module, players could continue play after achieving faction goals. In the summer of 1994, the publisher introduced Dark Domain in the United States. The Dark Domain module offered "a good mix of role-playing and wargaming, where teamwork and communication [were] necessary for success". The designers noted this game would suit all types of players, including those with "lone wolf and small positions".

In 1995, at the Andcon '95 conference, Midnight Games published the Swords of Pelarn module. It had no turn deadlines although turns were processed every 14 days. Swords of Pelarn was a fantasy role-playing game available for up to 200 players each iteration. This module was available for play by postal mail or email. Story line, roleplaying, and questing were elevated in importance, allowing easier advancement. Victory paths were available through adventuring as well as conquest through battle. Expected game length was several years.

By 2002, multiple modules were running simultaneously, with North Island Campaign games 24 and 26 active as well as Swords of Pelarn game 22. (Note: North Island Campaign 25 concluded in 2002. It was "designed to be played by two teams of six on a small island with massively accelerated setups".) By this time, Harlequin Games was publishing Legends under a license. In the same year, a US company, EpicMail, also licensed the game from Midnight Games, launching a module called The Ruins of Rome. This game eschewed competition while enabling rapid gameplay—allowing daily turn orders.

In 2009, The One Ring was released, based on Tolkien's The Lord of the Rings. It went on to win Best PBM Game at the 2010 Origins Awards.

As of 2022, Harlequin Games offered multiple game modules: Adventures in Avalon, Blood Tides Rising, Crown of Chaos, Immortal's Realm, Jade Eye, North Island Campaign, Swords of Pelarn, The One Ring, and Twilight Crusade.

=== Game modules ===
Release Year	Module Name	Publisher	Game System	Notes	Ref
1988	Crown of Avalon	Midnight Games	LI	Original module. Sword and Sorcery themed.	
1990	Realm of the Immortals	Midnight Games	LI	Setting in the world of Verana	
1992	North Island Campaign	Midnight Games	LI		
1994	Dark Domain	Midnight Games	LI		
1995	Swords of Pelarn	Midnight Games	LI	Winner of the Origins Award for Best New Play-by-Mail Game of 1995	
1997	Crown of Chaos	Midnight Games	LII	Based in the world of Elacrai	
1999	Adventures in Avalon	Midnight Games	LII	Remake of Crowns of Avalon	
2001	North Island Campaign II	Midnight Games	LII	Remake of North Island Campaign	
2001	Spirit of Pelarn	SSV Graz	LII	Released in Austria only	
2002	Dark Domain II	Midnight Games, Harlequin Games	LII	Made for an International Champions Game	
2002	Immortals Realm	SSV Graz	LII	Remake of Realm of the Immortals	
2002	The Ruins of Rome		LII		
2002/2003	Dark Realm	Midnight Games, Harlequin Games	LII		
2003	Hannibal's War	Epic Mail	LII	Earth setting with backdrop of war between the Carthaginians and Romans	
2003	Mystic Sea	SSV Graz	LII		
2003	Twilight Crusade	Midnight Games, Harlequin Games	LII		
2005	Avalon Revisited		LII		
2005	The Final Battle	SSV Graz	LII	Remade as Avalon Revisited in 2007	
2009	The One Ring		LII	Based on The Lord of the Rings; Won best PBM at the 2010 Origins Award.	
2014	Blood Tides Rising	Harlequin Games, SSV Graz	LII	Sword and sorcery module set in the land of Yohan.	
	Twilight Crusade	Harlequin Games	LII	Includes Starfarer character class.	
	Jade Eye	Harlequin Games, SSV Graz	LII	Latest module as of 2022.	

== Gameplay ==
Gameplay occurs on a large scale. The 2002 version comprised a world measuring 130 × 80 multifaceted provinces. (Note: Each province was ten square miles, or 64,000 acres.) At the time, the first and second years of play in a game focused on "exploration and consolidation" and conquest, respectively, while players pursued victory conditions in the third year. Multiple observers characterized it as a power game. Gameplay is closed-ended—each game has a conclusion. Turns are processed by computer, although in early versions certain special actions could be hand moderated. (Note: By 2007, the game had become fully computer moderated.)

Legends has a medieval setting. At the outset, players design characters using numerous available variables. Besides the basic name and sex, these include an insignia, race, culture, characteristics and attributes, spells (over 400 available), equipment, and others. Each module can encompass 200 players. Over 5,000 non-player characters (NPCs) are in the Legends world, some of which players can enlist to service.

The elements of gameplay are Characters, Forces, Guilds and Markets. Forces comprise groups of characters such as Legions or Fleets, but also physical locations such as Castles and Towns as well as Lairs and Ruins. Thematic options in the modern game range from "a warlord ruling a great empire, to a heroic adventurer, to a wandering bard and dreamer". Players can focus on combat during gameplay, but can also choose more limited goals and minimal player interaction. Players have significant freedom in choosing their playing style. Diplomacy is a key aspect of gameplay. Simply playing and exploring can be enjoyable, but a win requires player diplomacy.

The other aspects of gameplay are interactive, such as towns and markets, providing players with the opportunity to explore, discover items and treasure, and interact with NPC populations, monsters, and other player characters. Combat is available, to include battles with large armies. The martial aspects of play are customizable, including design of forces and method of employment.

Various online forums are available for players to discuss the game and ask for assistance, if needed.

== Reception ==
A Legends playtester presented a positive view of the early game with his statement that it "stuns the imagination!" David Dyche reviewed Legends in a 1990 issue of Paper Mayhem magazine noting, "The program is enormous, the routines powerful, and the depth of the game amazing." Reviewers Robert J. Bunker and Ronald C. Hanson stated in 1990 that the game "undoubtedly ushered in the 1990s as a new decade of PBM gaming noted for its ever increasing depth and sophistication", predicting it would win an Origins Award and attain high rankings as a PBM game. Bruce R. Daniel reviewed the game in a 1991 issue of White Wolf. He noted drawbacks as "daunting" turnsheets and mistakes in the rulebooks at the time. He stated that the "scope of the game is incredible" and its "playability and results are superb". He summarized, "If I could only play in one PBM game, my game of choice would be Legends. I can't recommend it highly enough." Dave Chappell reviewed Legends in the May–June 1995 issue of Flagship stating "After five years of play I am still not tired." In a 2002 issue of Flagship magazine, the editors stated that Legends had "breath-taking materials, varied modules, and a huge range of opportunities for different kinds of play".

Legends ranked high in player reviews in the early 1990s. In its first year, the game won Best PBM Game of 1990 in Paper Mayhem, with Jim Landes placing fourth in the Best GM of 1990 rankings, and Midnight Games winning Best PBM Company of 1990—displacing the well-known Flying Buffalo Inc. The game ranked similarly in 1991 in Paper Mayhem, with the game and publisher both taking first place in the same categories, while Jim Landes placed third as gamemaster. It also took second place for Most Popular Game in the 1991 Flagship PBM Awards in Canberra, Australia (behind El Mythico). Legends took 3rd of 10 in Paper Mayhem's Best PBM Game of 1992 list. By 1993, the game had risen one spot to 2nd place in the Paper Mayhem annual rankings. In 1994, it dropped to 5th place. In the March–April 1996 issue of Paper Mayhem, Midnight Games had three Legends game modules listed in its PBM Game Ratings. Swords of Pelarn was ranked No. 1 of 40 entries with a rating of 8.714 out of 9. North Island Campaign was No. 8 with a 7.706, and Dark Domain was No 17 with a 7.249.

The North Island Campaign was reviewed in White Wolf #48 (Oct., 1994) and stated that "While PBM power gaming proves itself to be one of the most expensive forms of adventuring, it delivers some of the most intense gaming that you'll find. For PBM power gaming aficionados, this Legends module is a 'must play.'"

Legends has continued to win awards into the 21st century. The game won one of the 2004 Gamers' Choice Awards at the Origins Awards. It also won best Play-By-Mail game at the 2010 Origins Awards.

== See also ==
- List of play-by-mail games

== Bibliography ==
- "1995 list of winners". Academy of Adventure Gaming Arts and Design. 1995. Archived from the original on 2009-05-04.
- "37th Origins Awards". 2010. Archived from the original on 2012-12-16.
- "The 2004 Origins Awards". 2004. Archived from the original on 9 September 2013.
- Austin, Phill (April–May 2002). "Harlequin's 'Other' Games: Legends – a Player's Voice". Flagship. No. 96. p. 9.
- Babcock, Chris (December 2013). "Diplomacy" (PDF). Suspense and Decision. No. 2. p. 16. Archived from the original (PDF) on July 4, 2021.
- Bock, Bill (May–June 1991). "Tips on Legends". Paper Mayhem. No. 48. The Paper Mayhem Association. p. 20.
- Bunker, Robert J.; Hanson, Ronald C. (September–October 1990). "Legends Playtest Notes". Paper Mayhem. No. 44. The Paper Mayhem Association. pp. 16–18.
- Chappell, Dave (May–June 1995). "Legends – Six Years On". Flagship Magazine. No. 55. U.S. Edition. pp. 18–20.
- Daniel, Bruce R. (June–July 1991). "Legends in our Time". White Wolf Magazine. No. 27. pp. 12–18.
- Davis, John (September–October 2022). "The Spokesmen Speak: Legends". Suspense & Decision: Turn Based Distant Gaming. No. 21. Talisman Consulting. pp. 5–6.
- DuBois, Steven (January–February 1997). "Monster Island: A Review". Paper Mayhem. No. 82. p. 4.
- Dyche, David W. (May–June 1990). "Legends: A Review". Paper Mayhem. No. 42. pp. 27–32.
- Dyche, David W. (July–August 1990). "Legends: A Review Part II". Paper Mayhem. No. 43. pp. 40–46.
- Editors (July–August 1985). "Rick Loomis on Play-By-Mail [Editor Intro]". The Space Gamer. No. #75. p. 35.
- Editors (May 1989). "PBM Update [Legends]". GM Magazine. Vol. 1, no. 9. p. 73.
- Editors (November–December 1990). "Where We're Heading". Paper Mayhem. No. 45. p. 2.
- Editors (November–December 1991). "Where We're Heading". Paper Mayhem. No. 51. pp. 2–3.
- Editors (September–October 1991). "PBM Game Ratings as of 7-14-91". Paper Mayhem. No. 50. p. 54.
- Editors (November–December 1992). "Where We're Heading". Paper Mayhem. No. 57. pp. 2–3.
- Editors (November–December 1994). "The Spokesmen Speak: Fantasy Wargames". Flagship. No. 52 (US ed.). pp. 5–6.
- Editors (January–February 1994). "Where We're Heading". Paper Mayhem. No. 64. p. 2.
- Editors (January–February 1995). "Where We're Heading". Paper Mayhem. No. 70. p. 2.
- Editors (January–February 1995). "The Spokesmen Speak: Fantasy Wargames". Flagship. No. 53 (US ed.). pp. 7–9.
- Editors (March–April 1996). "PBM Game Ratings as of 3/16/96". Paper Mayhem. No. 77. p. 36.
- Editors (August–September 2002). "Newsdesk". Flagship. No. 98. p. 4.
- Editors (August–September 2002). "Hall of Fame". Flagship. No. 98. p. 29.
- Eyma, Aayko (2003). "Legends: Fantastic Flexibility" (PDF). Archived from the original (PDF) on March 28, 2007.
- Eyma, Aayko (2005). "The Legends Corner". Archived from the original on July 20, 2011.
- Eyma, Aayko. "Legends Victory Page". Archived from the original on March 17, 2007.
- Flagship Editors (February–March 2005). "Turn-Based Gaming" (PDF). Flagship. No. 112. p. 5.
- Flying Buffalo, Inc. "Covert Operations". Flying Buffalo Inc.
- Flying Buffalo, Inc. "Nuclear Destruction". Flying Buffalo Inc..
- Greenberg, Andrew (May–June 1993). "PBM Corner: A Beginning in Play-By-Mail; Is it Worth It?". White Wolf Magazine. No. 36. pp. 8–9.
- Haberkern, Larry (March–April 1996). "Legends: Swords of Pelarn Module Review". Paper Mayhem. No. 77. p. 12.
- "Legends II: Harlequin Rulebook" (PDF). Harlequin Games. 2007. Archived from the original (PDF) on October 4, 2022.
- "Modules". Harlequin Games.
- "PBM Activity Corner: Harlequin Games". Suspense & Decision. No. 9. July 2014. pp. 71–72.
- Harvey, Chris (Spring 1984). "The Future of PBM". Flagship. No. 2. p. 21.
- Harvey, Chris (April–May 2003). "My Life in Games" (PDF). Flagship. No. 102. p. 26.
- Ixnay (November 2013). "PBM is Dead: Long Live PBM". Suspense & Decision. No. 1. pp. 26–29.
- Loth III, John Kevin (March–April 1986). "A PBM Primer". Paper Mayhem. No. 17. p. 42.
- "It's a Crime (Rule Page)". KJC Games.
- Lindahl, Greg. "PBM / PBEM List Index: closed-ended". Play by Email (PBeM) & Play by Mail (PBM) List Index.
- Leonard, Daniel (November–December 1991). "Legends: The Realm of the Immortals". Paper Mayhem. No. 51. p. 34.
- McDowell, Rick (May 2014). "What's Your Game? Top Tier Episodic Strategy Game (PBEM) Design Considerations". Suspense & Decision. No. 7. pp. 4–6.
- McLain, Bob (August 1, 1993). "Play By Mail: The Infancy of Cyberspace". Pyramid. sjgames.com.
- Mosteller, Charles (June 2014). "An Open Invitation To the Player Base of Turn-Based Games" (PDF). Suspense and Decision. No. 8. p. 76.
- Paduch, Sally (June 27, 1993). "Email Brings Immediacy to Play-By-Mail Games". New York Times. p. RC21.
- Palmer, Nicky (January 2003). "Flagship 100: A Founder's Memories" (PDF). Flagship. No. 100. p. 4.
- Mouchet, Paul (February 2017). "PBM: Reducing the "Barrier to Entry"" (PDF). Suspense and Decision. No. 15. PlayByMail.net. pp. 10–12. Archived from the original (PDF) on October 30, 2020.
- Mulholland, Carol (2010). "Carol's Logbook" (PDF). Flagship. No. 130. p. 43.
- Paper Mayhem editors (January–February 1993). "Front Matter". Paper Mayhem. No. 58. p. 1.
- Popolizio, Mike; LeBlanc, Liz; Popolizio, Marti (January–February 1990). "Revamping a Classic! The Redesign of BSE". Paper Mayhem. No. 40. pp. 8–10.
- Simmons, Steve (July–August 1990). "Legends – The Crown of Avalon: A First Impression". Paper Mayhem. No. 43. pp. 47–48.
- Tindall, John (March 1992). "The 1991 Flagship Australia PBM Awards". Flagship. No. 36 (US ed.). pp. 11–12.
- "TSG Surveys: Play-By-Mail Game Companies". The Space Gamer. No. 33. November 1980. p. 13.
- Townsend, Jim (January–February 1987). "How to Win in PBM—An Organizational Viewpoint". Paper Mayhem. No. 22. p. 29.
- Townsend, Jim (March–April 1987). "A Real Look at Heroic Fantasy". Paper Mayhem. No. 23. p. 24.
- Townsend, Jim (1988). "The PBM Corner". White Wolf Magazine. No. 11. p. 20.
