= Starmaster (play-by-mail game) =

Science fiction play-by-mail game

- Ad for StarMaster in Space Gamer #42
- Other names: StarMaster
- Designers: Richard Lloyd
- Publishers: Schubel & Son
- Years active: 1979 to 1992
- Genres: science fiction, space opera
- Languages: English
- Players: unlimited
- Playing time: unlimited
- Materials required: Instructions, order sheets, turn results, paper, pencil
- Media type: Play-by-mail or email

StarMaster is an open-ended, computer-moderated play-by-mail game that was published and administered by Schubel & Son from 1979 to 1992.

== Gameplay ==
Starmaster was a strategic science fiction play-by-mail game that included space exploration, colonization of worlds, and options for diplomacy or combat with other races encountered. The premise of the game was that new races that achieve "faster-than-light" space travel would naturally explore and colonize neighboring star systems, and eventually encounter other developing races.

On a beginning player's first turn, the player was given 300 points to design a new race, with each physical advantage costing a certain number of points. (Fangs cost more than mandibles, which in turn cost more than teeth.) Players not wanting to try insectoid, reptile, avian or other exotic races could choose to start with a basic human costing 300 points; they could then customize the race by adding advanced abilities (telepathy for 90 points, for example), while removing ordinary human abilities in order to keep the racial score under 300 points. Other options included whether the race was hive mind, or organized into a caste system that included several very different life forms. The player would also make basic decisions about the size and climate of their home planet.

Having established their race, the player's new home world was then placed near the edge of the galactic map, with other "new" races, so they would have a chance to explore nearby star systems in their "neighborhood" before encountering some of the more experienced players closer to the galactic center.

Turns were moderated by a computer. The cost in 1980 was $10 for the rulebook and the first three turns. The cost of each subsequent turn was $2.50. However, since space battles, trade activities, colonies' actions and any special activities each counted as a turn, reviewer Bill Fawcett noted that "someone playing Starmaster actively for a year could shell out a small fortune."

In 1980, Starmaster had more than 2000 active players.

== Publication history ==
Richard Lloyd designed the game of StarMaster beginning in late 1979, and was involved as Game Designer for the next twelve years. In May 1992, Lloyd felt the game was taking up too much of his time and decided to end the game for at least a year, without licensing the game to another company. In a note to StarMaster players in Paper Mayhem, a magazine for play-by-mail gamers, Lloyd left open the possibility of restarting the game as a fully computerized version in the future. However, this never occurred.

== Reception ==
In the May–June 1980 edition of The Space Gamer (Issue No. 28), Stefan Jones found the ongoing cost of the game to be high, but thought that "the game is worth the money; it is entertaining and well run. For many, however, money is better spent elsewhere. I recommend Starmaster to anyone who enjoys SF gaming and play-by-mail games.".

In the October 1980 edition of Dragon (Issue 42), Bill Fawcett also found the cost per turn to be very high, and suggested that players with a tight budget should look elsewhere for a less expensive PBM game. But Fawcett found the game, and especially the race creation, "detailed, entertaining, and well-run... If the cost doesn’t deter you, the scope and potential variety promise hours of enjoyment.

In the April 1983 edition of Dragon (Issue 72), Michael Gray stated "Hundreds of people play this game, all in the same galaxy. As with almost all “infinite” PBM role-playing games, there is no turn deadline. Schubel & Son puts out a Star Master newsletter with all sorts of information about the game, such as strategy tips, news of great alliances, and reports of warfare."

In Issue 27 of Abyss, David Macnamara called this "pointless, unbalanced, overpriced hodgepodge [that] has been on the market far too long." Macnamara complained that the Game Masters acceded to requests from free-spending players to set them up near new players, allowing them to quickly start a new alien race to overwhelm the newcomers. Macnamara concluded, "With competent management and a little less greed this could have been a good game; as it is I'd only recommend it to my worst enemy unless he were filthy rich."

In Issue 14 of the British RPG magazine Imagine, Brian Creese commented "Generally speaking, this game seems to require quite a lot of effort to get going, but this is inevitable given its design."

== See also ==
- List of play-by-mail games
- Star Venture
