= Ad Astra (play-by-mail game) =

Science fiction role-playing game

- Designers: John M. Ess
- Publishers: Superior Simulations
- Years active: ~1987
- Genres: Space fantasy
- Languages: English
- Systems: Computer-moderated
- Playing time: Fixed
- Materials required: Instructions, order sheets, turn results, paper, pencil
- Media type: Play-by-mail

Ad Astra is a closed-end, computer-moderated play-by-mail (PBM) game that was published by Superior Simulations. It was a turn-based space fantasy game designed by John M. Ess.

== Gameplay ==
Ad Astra was a computer-moderated science fiction play-by-mail game, with a fixed deadline and a strategic focus.

New players received a 30-page rulebook which, in 1987, cost $2. Players operated on a hex grid of 225 stars, manipulating various elements of gameplay to include various types of starships, ground defense units, and starbases. Conquest and expansion as well as diplomacy among players played key roles in Ad Astra. Players also had to manage the costs of new elements of gameplay, as overspending affected remaining points at the end of the game, with the player with the highest number of points being victorious.

== Reception ==
Ad Astra was reviewed in The February–March 1987 issue of Space Gamer/Fantasy Gamer. The reviewer commented, "For those people who like this type of game, I don't think that there is a better one of its type on the PBM market today. It is a well-oiled machine. But then so is a fork lift. I can respect the efficient design of a fort lift, but I sure can't get excited about one. So, if you are the type of player who revels in objective and detached exercised of logic, look no farther. Ad Astra is well worth your money and time." Jim Townsend gave Ad Astra a positive review in the May–June 1987 issue of Paper Mayhem, stating, "I highly recommend Ad Astra to anyone who likes good, active space games at a very reasonable price", (Note: The price at the time was $3.50 per turn with no limit on orders per turn.) while also noting that "the service is some of the best in the industry".

In the September–October 1992 issue of Paper Mayhem magazine, Ad Astra was ranked No. 68 of 84 play-by-mail games by its readers.

== See also ==
- List of play-by-mail games

== Bibliography ==
- "Ad Astra or Darth Vadar and the IRS". Space Gamer/Fantasy Gamer. No. 77. Diverse Talents, Incorporated. February–March 1987. pp. 46–47.
- "PBM Game Ratings as of 07-20-92". Paper Mayhem. No. 56. September–October 1992. p. 52.
- Townsend, Jim (January–February 1987). "Winning in Ad Astra". Paper Mayhem. No. 22. pp. 6–7.
- Townsend, Jim (May–June 1987). "Winning in Ad Astra – Part Two". Paper Mayhem. No. 24. pp. 29–33.
