= Jay Allen Sanford =

American author and cartoonist (born 1960)

- Born: February 18, 1960 (age 66) Middleborough, Massachusetts
- Areas: Cartoonist, Editor, Publisher
- Pseudonyms: Tiki, Sgt. Tiki, Sarge
- Notable works: Carnal Comics

Jay Allen Sanford (born February 18, 1960) is an American author and cartoonist best known for his work with Revolutionary Comics, Carnal Comics, and Pacific Comics. He began writing the comic book Rock 'N' Roll Comics (created by Todd Loren) in 1989 as of the title's second issue, and still oversees the rock comic reprints published by Bluewater Productions and others. The publishing company he co-founded, Carnal Comics, is best known for launching the movie and cartoon character Demi the Demoness. Sanford ran Carnal Comics from 1994 through 2000, before handing over the publishing reins to SS Crompton.

Sanford has been a columnist and cartoonist for the San Diego Reader since 1994, writing articles and drawing two weekly comic strips: "Overheard in San Diego" and "Famous Former Neighbors".

== Career ==
=== Comic books ===
Sanford, who grew up in Wallingford, Connecticut and East Lyme, Connecticut, has specialized in creating comic books and strips based on true life incidents and people. Most of the 200 or so reality-based comic books he has created were done for Revolutionary Comics, as well as for Comic Zone (UFO/Alien Encounters, Cult TV), Personality Comics (The Beatles, the Rolling Stones, Star Trek: The Original Crew), Re-Visionary Press (Sexploitation Cinema: A Cartoon History, Triple-X Cinema: A Cartoon History), Celebrity Comics (Elvis Scrapbook), Tower Records (Pulse!), Bluewater Productions (Orbit: the Stan Lee Story, Hard Rock Heroes), and others.

Among the co-creators to work on reality comics with Sanford are Tom Luth, Stuart Immonen, Scott Jackson, Leonard Kirk, Michael Avon Oeming, Aaron Sowd, Todd Loren, Holly Golightly, Pat Broderick, Robert Schnakenberg, Terry Dodson, Greg Fox, Brad W. Foster, Bart Mendoza, Gene Simmons, Jamie Murray, Jim Holliday, William Margold, Jenna Jameson, Marilyn Chambers, Ginger Lynn, Hyapatia Lee, Annie Sprinkle, Robert Williams, and Dick Ayers.

One of his few comic book projects not reality-based is Deepest Dimension Terror Anthology, co-created with Star Trek, Twilight Zone, and Logan's Run writer George Clayton Johnson. Creators whose work appears in the series include Robert Bloch, Larry Niven, Dærick Gröss Sr., Rick Geary, Spain Rodriguez, Dennis Etchison, and others.

After retiring from comic book publishing in 2000, Sanford began freelancing for other publishers and concentrating on multiple comic strips (see below) and writing projects (below). He also teaches specialized courses in comic book marketing, of both properties and creators, as a professor of sequential art at the Savannah College of Art and Design.

=== Comic strips ===
In 1993, Sanford launched a multi-page color comic section called Rock Tales, published monthly in Larry Flynt's music periodical RIP magazine and featuring short bios, illustrated interviews, and slice-of-life vignettes starring various rock performers. After RIP ceased publication, Rock Tales began running as a one-page true-stories comic strip on the inside back cover of each issue of Spin (magazine), founded by Flynt rival Bob Guccione Jr., publisher of Penthouse Magazine. Rock Tales appears to have ceased as of the December 2012 issue of Spin (magazine), its final newsstand edition before the print publication was cancelled and the periodical moved to website-only status.

From 1996 to 1997, Sanford headed up another multi-page color comic section called Oui's Carnal Comics, published monthly in Oui magazine, launched in the U.S. by Playboy Enterprises and at the time one of the top selling men's periodicals. The comics frequently included the adventures of Carnal Comics character Demi the Demoness, who later became the first adult comic book character to be featured in a live action film adaptation. After 1997, the Carnal Comics cartoon pullouts occasionally ran in other publications like Hustler Humor, New Rave Magazine, AVN Adult Video News, Adult Cinema Review, Penthouse Magazine, Penthouse Comixxx, and elsewhere.

Since 1994, Sanford has been a columnist and cartoonist for the San Diego Reader. His weekly Reader comic strip "Overheard in San Diego" was launched in late 1995, while a second weekly strip, "Famous Former Neighbors" debuted in 2002. Both reality-based strips are still running.

In September 2010, Sanford launched a new political comic strip for a bi-weekly periodical published by San Diego Uptown News, co-created by editorial writer Pat Sherman. Usually consisting of two large panels spoofing local politicians, the strip appears to have ceased once Sherman left the paper in early 2011. Since 2015, he has been illustrating a weekly strip called Overheard in Ellijay for the Ellijay Times Courier weekly newspaper, offering a more rural version of the Overheard in San Diego strip.

=== Writing ===
In addition to writing cover features for the weekly San Diego Reader newspaper, he has headed up various columns for the paper like Blurt, Lists, URLwatching, Record Release Roundup, Most Downloaded, the magazine's online Local Music Database, and the daily blogs Rock Around the Town, Jam Session, Out and About, and Big Screen.

Among his Reader features are several in-depth overviews chronicling San Diego history and pop culture, such as Before It Was the Gaslamp: Downtown's Grindhouse Theater Row in the '70s, The Rise and Fall of San Diego's Pacific Comics, Pussycat Theaters – a Comprehensive History of a California Dynasty, and Field of Screens: San Diego Drive-In Theater History 1947–2008.

As a writer for other publications, his articles about pop culture, social issues, and historical research have been published in magazines like Gauntlet, Midnight Marquee, Revolt in Style, Axcess Magazine, TV Teens, In the Midnight Hour, FilmFax, Cult Movies, Sports Superstars, Soundwaves (Connecticut), Mojo (magazine) (U.K.), Starlog, Hit Parader, Pulse!, and various Twilight Zone literature.

Among the books he wrote or co-authored are Triple-X Cinema: A Cartoon History, The Beatles Experience, The Pink Floyd Experience, The Led Zeppelin Experience, Rock 'N' Roll Cartoon History: The Sixties, Rock 'N' Roll Cartoon History: The Seventies, Hard Rock Heroes, Pussycat Theaters: a Comprehensive History of a California Dynasty, Overheard in San Diego Omnibus, and Field of Screens: San Diego Drive-In Theater History 1947 - 2008.

The 2012 fiction book City of the Gods: Forgotten- Mythic Tales includes his short story "Wanted: Mordecai," and other books featuring his stories and artwork include Mythic Tales Volume 2 ("Kaman's Crusade"), Can Rock 'N' Roll Save the World, Aerosmith: The Ultimate Illustrated History of the Boston Bad Boys, AC/DC: The Ultimate Illustrated History, Rush: The Illustrated History, Queen: The Ultimate Illustrated History of the Crown Kings of Rock, and Fogel's Underground Price and Grading Guide (2015 edition).

=== Film and television ===
Sanford's earliest television work appears to be scripting and co-producing a 1984 Twilight Zone-inspired sci-fi/fantasy anthology called Possible Dreams. His work for MTV and VH1 includes research and copy writing for TV specials like 100 Shocking Music Moments, 100 Greatest One Hit Wonders, 40 Dumbest Celebrity Quotes, 200 Greatest Pop Culture Icons, Behind the Music; Ratt, Behind the Music; Anthrax, I Love the '70s, Most Metal Moments, I Love the '80s, and writing info nuggets for the 2011 revival of the Pop-Up Video series.

Onscreen, he appears in the 2005 documentary film Unauthorized and Proud Of It, alongside Alice Cooper, Mojo Nixon, Gene Simmons, painter Robert Williams, publishers Denis Kitchen and Gary Groth, cartoonists Mary Fleener and Dennis Worden, Cynthia Plaster Caster, and others. The film, featuring a soundtrack by Elvis Costello (among others), was released on DVD in 2012 as The Story of Rock 'N' Roll Comics.

Film scripts and storyboards include Annabel Chong's Sordid Stories, Jenna Jameson's Wicked Weapon, Marilyn Chambers Still Insatiable, and Ginger Lynn: Torn. He's also interviewed on camera in the documentary film Drive-In Americana, concerning the history of drive-in theaters.

=== Illustration ===
Sanford's illustrations grace event posters, record sleeves, and tour posters for acts like Cheap Trick, the Tubes, the Bugs, Southtown Generals (with members of P.O.D. and Psydecar), Colin Clyne, Helen Bach, Bees She Sees, Liquid Blue, Wise Monkey Orchestra, Superunloader, Scott West, Dateless Losers, Gary Heffern (of The Penetrators), 40 Oz. to Freedom, the Cardiac Kidz, Chula Vista Soldier Club, Todo Mundo, the Styletones, Concrete Project, Lady Dottie and the Diamonds, Heavy Guilt, Psydecar, Rad Fish, Zig Zag Jones, and others. His CD booklet designs include the Mötley Crüe box set Music To Crash Your Car To Vol. 2, as well as similar comic-themed album inserts for compilations featuring the Ramones, Jerry Lee Lewis, the Dead Kennedys, and more. Among his fully painted album covers are Water Is Magic by Klaatu (band) member Dee Long. Sanford's concert poster series for RT's Longboard Grill in San Diego began in January 2011, with a new comic-themed numbered poster appearing approximately weekly. Other concert series posters have been created for San Diego venues such as the Belly Up Tavern, Soda Bar, Waterfront Park, and Humphreys By the Bay.
