= Catalyst (role-playing game supplements) =

Tabletop role-playing game supplements

Catalyst is a series of fantasy role-playing game supplements created by Flying Buffalo as a series of game aides that could be used with any medieval fantasy-themed role-playing game system. The first supplement, Grimtooth's Traps, was released in 1981. Numerous other Catalyst books were produced, including the Citybook series, seven Traps books, Treasure Vault, and the Lejentia campaign setting. The latest, City of the Gods Map Pack was produced in 2011.

Citybook I was the winner of the HG Wells Best Role Playing Adventure in 1982. Other Catalyst books have been nominees for the same award in later years.

Major contributors to the Catalyst books include Michael A. Stackpole, Liz Danforth, Steve Crompton, Ken St. Andre, Jennell Jaquays, Deb Wykle (a.k.a. Debora Kerr and Wynn Mercere), Rick Loomis, Larry DiTillio, and Bear Peters, along with many others.

== Titles ==
- Grimtooth's Traps
- Grimtooth's Traps Too
- Grimtooth's Traps Fore
- Grimtooth's Traps Ate
- Grimtooth's Traps Lite
- Grimtooth's Traps Bazarr
- Grimtooth's Dungeon of Doom
- The Wurst of Grimtooth's Traps (Published by Necromancer Games)
- Grimtooth's Ultimate Traps Collection (Published by Goodman Games)
- Citybook I: Butcher, Baker, Candlestick Maker
- Citybook II: Port O' Call
- Citybook III: Deadly Nightside
- Citybook IV: On the Road
- Citybook V: Sideshow
- Citybook VI: Up Town
- Citybook VII: King's River Bridge
- MAPS 1: Cities
- MAPS 2: Places of Legend
- City of the Gods: Forgotten Map Pack
- Lejentia Campaigns Book 1: Skully's Harbor
- Lejentia Campaigns Book 2: Fort Bevits
- Lejentia Adventure Pack
- Treasure Vault
- Wilderness Encounters
