= Kiss (comics) =

Appearance of the American rock band in comics

Comic books have been an integral and popular part of the American rock group Kiss' merchandising since 1977, beginning with their appearance in Marvel Comics' Howard the Duck #12. Over their career of nearly four decades, Kiss has licensed their name to "more than 3,000 product(s) . . . to become nearly a one-billion-dollar brand."

Licensed Kiss stories and adventures have been published by Marvel Comics, Image Comics, Dark Horse Comics, Platinum Studios, Archie Comics, and IDW Publishing; unlicensed stories have been published by Revolutionary Comics, among others. Ironically, according to frontman Gene Simmons, all the band members except himself "hate comic books."

== Publishers ==
=== Marvel Comics ===
Kiss's first comic book appearance was in issue #12 of Marvel's Howard the Duck in May 1977, titled "Mind Mush!". The group also appeared in issue #13 of the series, titled "Rock, Roll Over and Writhe!".

In 1977 Marvel Comics published a magazine-format full-color comic book, titled A Marvel Comics Super Special!: Kiss presenting the band Kiss as superheroes. It was the first in the Marvel Comics Super Special series which featured other musicians such as The Beatles. Blood from each band member was drawn by a registered nurse, witnessed by a notary public, and poured into the vats of red ink used for printing the comic at Marvel's Borden Ink plant in Depew, New York. Marvel also published a second Kiss comic magazine, issue #5 in the Super Special series, in 1978, with much less fanfare.

In 1995 Marvel printed a trade paperback issue compiling issue #1 and #5 of the Super Special series, titled KISS Klassics. A year later Marvel released the magazine KISSnation, which featured interviews and photographs concerning the band's reunion and subsequent Alive/Worldwide Tour. KISSnation also came with the KISS Meets the X-Men comic.

==== Title list ====
- Howard the Duck #12: "Mind-Mush!" (May 1977)
- Howard the Duck #13: "Rock, Roll Over and Writhe!" (June 1977)
- A Marvel Comics Super Special #1: A Marvel Comics Super Special!: Kiss (1977)
- A Marvel Comics Super Special #5: A Marvel Comics Super Special!: Kiss (1978)
- Kiss Classics (1995)
- Kissnation (1996)

=== Revolutionary Comics ===
Ever since the phenomenon created around the first Kiss comic in 1977, many unlicensed comics featuring the Kiss characters have been published. The most notable of these were published by Revolutionary Comics, known for their titles Rock N' Roll Comics and Hard Rock Comics. Although Revolutionary's comics were not sanctioned by Kiss or the group's lawyers, Gene Simmons was especially vocal in his support of the company, seen wearing a Hard Rock Comics T-shirt in videos for Alive III and on the back cover of the album itself. Both Simmons and Stanley granted interviews for the Revolutionary Kiss comics, and the same Hard Rock Comics creative team also did the comic bio section of Kiss' own KISStory hardcover book, as well as a comic adaptation of The Elder which has so far only been published in Metal Edge Magazine.

==== Title list ====
- Rock 'N' Roll Comics #9 (March 1990) — by Robert Conte and Greg Fox
- Hard Rock Comics #5: "Kiss: Tales from the Tours" (June 1992) — by Spike Steffenhagen and Scott Pentzer
- Kiss Pre-History #1–3 (Spring 1993) — by Spike Steffenhagen, Jay Allen Sanford, and Scott Pentzer

=== Image Comics ===
==== Psycho Circus ====
In 1997 Image began printing the first officially licensed non-Marvel Kiss comic, Todd McFarlane's Kiss: Psycho Circus. It lasted for 31 issues and was compiled into four trade paperback issues. The series was based on a tour theme that Kiss were working on at the time, and spawned five magazines that focused on the comic series. Wizard also printed a special edition magazine detailing the characters that appeared throughout the comic series. The series was completed in the year 2000.

==== Kiss Special Wizard Edition ====
- 1 promo Issue (Wizard, 1998)

==== Kiss: Psycho Circus Comic Magazine ====
- 5 issues (published by McFarlane/Medina/Image, 1999)

==== Trade paperbacks ====
1. Psycho Circus
2. Destroyer
3. Whispered Scream
4. Legends & Night

=== Dark Horse Comics ===
Dark Horse Comics began the next Kiss comic series, simply titled Kiss, in 2002, with X-Men writer Joe Casey. The series lasted for unnamed 13 issues, with each issue having a variant photograph cover (with the exception of issues #1 and #7 which each had a third variant cover) and was compiled into four trade paperback issues. Dark Horse completed the Kiss series in 2004.

==== Trade paperbacks ====
- volume #1: Rediscovery
- volume #2: Return of the Phantom
- volume #3: Men and Monsters
- volume #4: Unholy War

=== Platinum Studios ===
In 2007 the KISS Comics Group launched a joint venture with Platinum Studios to publish a new Kiss comic, Kiss 4K. The series was launched at the Los Angeles Wizard World Convention in March 2007 with the unveiling of the oversized Destroyer Edition, which measured 20 "x 30" and was released in five variant editions. The series was written by Ricky Sprague and the art was by Daniel Campos, Kevin Crossley & Thomas Ruppert. Kiss Comics Group logo and Kiss 4K logo by Spiro Papadatos.

==== Kiss 4K ====
Kiss 4K released six print issues and four digital issues, in addition to the over-sized Destroyer Edition of Issue #1, a limited edition preview issue, and the Kissmas special issue. A webcomic series was also produced in conjunction with the print issues, telling stories about previous holders of the Kiss powers. In 2009, a lithograph boxed set of exclusive art from the Kiss 4K series was released.

- 4K Preview Issue (Limited Edition)
- Legends Never Die Story Arc:
  - Issue #1
    - Over-sized Destroyer Edition variants: black & white, yellow bar, white bar, black bar, "Scott's Vault" yellow bar
    - Standard-sized variants: "Scott's Vault" silver foil edition, red foil, gold foil, sketch cover, untrimmed version
  - Issues #2–6 — Standard-sized retail issues
  - Issues #7–10 — "Online Edition" digital-only issues
- Kissmas Special (Christmas 2007) — Available in a "Scott's Vault" silver foil variant
- Webcomics:
  - Casanova/Starchild: "Tonight You Belong To Me", "Love's A Deadly Weapon" & "Partners In Crime"
  - Yoshiee/Chikara: "Almost Human" & "Lonely Is The Hunter"
  - Constantine/Celestial: "War Machine" & "Strange Ways"
  - Shaka/The Demon: "Childhood's End" & "I Walk Alone"
  - Christmas Special: "Let It Snow, Rock & Roll!"
- The Art of Kiss 4K — lithograph box set

=== Archie Comics ===
In 2011 Kiss announced the release of Archie Meets Kiss, a new four-issue comic book series in conjunction with Archie Comics. Each issue was released with two variant covers and all four issues were compiled into both a trade paperback and trade hardcover book.

=== IDW Publishing ===
==== Kiss ====
Kiss was a comic series being printed by IDW Publishing, written by Chris Ryall and illustrated by Jamal Igle. The first issue was released in June 2012 and so far eight issues have been published. The first issue is titled "Dressed to Kill" and has six variant covers. Part 2 of "Dressed to Kill" was released in July and has five variant covers.

==== Greatest Hits ====
IDW has published a series of trade paperbacks, titled Kiss Greatest Hits, which compiled every series of Kiss comics, starting with Kiss' Marvel comics. The first issue was titled Kiss Greatest Hits, Vol. 1: The Marvel Years and compiled issue #1 and #5 of the Marvel Comics Super Special series featuring the Kiss characters. The second edition collected issue 1-6 of the Todd McFarlane Psycho Circus series.

==== Mars Attacks: Flaming Youths ====
On January 9, 2013, IDW released a special one-shot issue of their Mars Attacks series. The series was written by Chris Ryall, with art by Alan Robinson.

- Mars Attacks: Flaming Youths — 2 variant covers

==== Kiss Solo ====
Beginning in March 2013, IDW released a four-issue series starring the Demon, the Starchild, the Catman and the Spaceman, starting with Demon. The series was illustrated by Angel Medina and was once again written by Chris Ryall.

==== Kiss Kids ====
This series saw Kiss re-imagined as children. The four-issue series was released monthly from August 2013 through November 2013. The series was illustrated by José Holder.

=== Dynamite Entertainment ===
Dynamite Entertainment obtained the rights to create Kiss comics in July 2016. Written by Amy Chu and illustrated by Kewber Baal, the first issue of their flagship series was released in October 2016.

==== Kiss ====
The flagship monthly Kiss comic published by Dynamite revolves around four teenagers who begin to question the nature of the isolated post-apocalyptic city they are forced to live in and are determined to unlock the secrets of their society. It debuted in October 2016 and ended in August 2017 with ten issues.

==== Kiss: The Demon ====
Gene Simmons' character "The Demon" was given a 4-issue spin-off title by Dynamite, with the series being published from January 2017 through April 2017.

==== Kiss/Vampirella ====
Dynamite's 5-issue crossover series with Vampirella is set to be published monthly from June 2017 through October 2017.

==== Phantom Obsession ====
Dynamite's 5-issue series called Phantom Obsession was published monthly from August 2021 through December 2021.

== Collections ==
=== Kiss Kompendium ===
The Kiss Kompendium is a hardcover collection of Kiss comics released on December 8, 2009, by Harper Design. It compiles both issues of the Marvel Comics Super Special, issues #1 & #5, the Marvel Kissnation comic, the comic printed especially for 1995 book, KISStory, along with the Psycho Circus and the Dark Horse comic series. The book also features exclusive Kiss photos taken backstage during the band's Sonic Boom tour, as well as commentary by band members Gene Simmons and Paul Stanley.

== See also ==
- Kiss books
