= Citybook I: Butcher, Baker, Candlestick Maker =

1982 role-playing game supplement

Citybook I: Butcher, Baker, Candlestick Maker is a role-playing game supplement published by Flying Buffalo in 1982 as part of their Catalyst series of game aids for any role-playing game system. It was written by Steve Crompton, and includes information on how to use typical medieval urban businesses in role-playing encounters. It won an Origins Award and received positive reviews in game periodicals including The Space Gamer, Different Worlds, Dragon, and White Dwarf.

== Description ==
In 1981, Flying Buffalo conceived of the Catalyst series of universal role-playing games aid that could be adapted to any role-playing game system; Grimtooth's Traps was the first such publication. The following year, Flying Buffalo published Citybook I: Butcher, Baker, Candlestick Maker, a 125-page 8.5" x 11" softcover book about typical medieval urban businesses, written by Steve Crompton, with illustrations by Stephan Peregrine and Liz Danforth.

Since the contents are not keyed to any specific role-playing system, the introductory section explains how the contents can be adapted to the game system of the referee's choice.

The next chapter gives general information about role-playing for new players.

The rest of the book gives detailed descriptions of 25 businesses, including:

- keyed floor plans of the establishment
- character outlines and portraits of notable personalities associated with each business
- several suggestions on how the business and personalities could be adapted into an adventure

The 25 business are subdivided into several categories:

- Lodging and entertainment (tavern and inn)
- Public services (stables, public baths, candlemaker, a surgeon, magic shop, taxidermist, museum, an oracle, tattoo parlor)
- Hardware (armory, blacksmith, bowyer, tanner)
- Community services (clocktower, news guild)
- Spiritual (temple, undertaker, cemetery)
- Security (police, jail)

== Publication history ==
Citybook I: Butcher, Baker, Candlestick Maker was edited by Larry DiTillio, with a cover by Stephan Peregrine, and art by Liz Danforth and Steve Crompton, and was published by Blade/Flying Buffalo in 1982 as a 128-page book. The book was republished by Blade/Task Force Games in 1986.

Several more volumes in this series were subsequently published, including Citybook II: Port o' Call, and Citybook III: Deadly Nightside.

== Reception ==
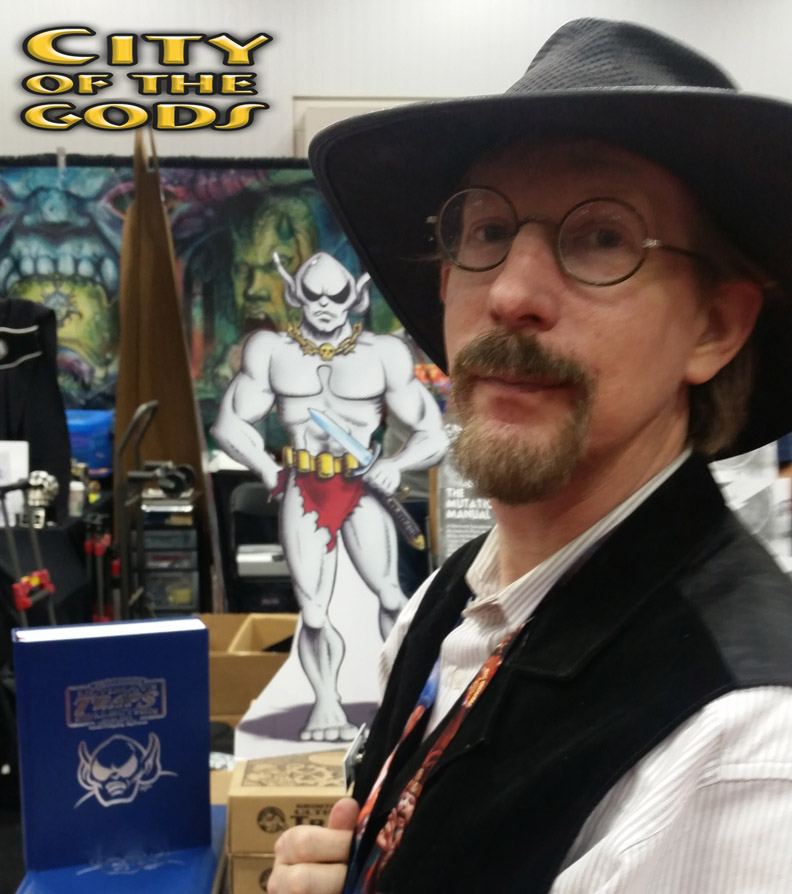
The book was designed by Steve Crompton (pictured in 2017).

In the August 1982 edition of The Space Gamer (No. 54), Stefan Jones gave the book a thumbs up, saying, "This aid is a perfect example of how any game product should be done: clear descriptions, a wide variety of places and people, and possibilities for adventure easily playable. If you think the only place to have adventures is in a dungeon or the deep wilderness, pick up a copy of City Book and be amazed. If you want to see how descriptive and imaginative your game settings can be, get it. An excellent product that is worth every cent of its cover price."

Patrick Amory reviewed Citybook 1 for Different Worlds magazine and stated that "In the end, however, it is the style of the GM that will determine a campaign's flavor, not the contents of his gaming supplements. City Book I represents a stride forwards in FRP supplements, and there are more to come. Despite the rather steep price, this work is fairly useful and well-done. I recommend it."

In the February 1983 edition of Dragon (Issue 70), Ken Rolston called this book "attractively designed, written well, imaginative, and conveniently applicable to any FRP rules system." Although he thought the $14.95 price tag was expensive, he still thought the book was a "worthwhile labor-saving device for the fantasy gamemaster running city adventures." Rolston believed the book compared favorably to other similar supplements, saying, "The descriptions of the establishments and personalities of this package are far more completely developed than those of other recent city materials... Citybook is entertaining and readable, moreso than most other fantasy gaming supplements. The presentation is well-organized and coherent. The tone is light-hearted and amusing, unlike the grim flavor of many game materials." He concluded with a strong recommendation, saying, "For the FRP gamemaster who runs city adventures, Citybook I is an excellent resource. The settings, characters, and narrative potentials of the materials are imaginative and appealing. The detail is complete and visual, but not overwhelming. It can be used to supplement any campaign, and requires relatively little work from the GM to adapt to his own system. It is a pleasure to read and a pleasure to the eye — material that will be read and used, rather than filed away."

Nicholas J R Dougan reviewed Citybook I for White Dwarf #39, giving it an overall rating of 7 out of 10, and stated that "What is special about this book is that is concentrates on the details of 'ordinary life' in a fantasy city - where the adventurers can buy lunch, who can repair their weapons best, what funeral arrangements are available for their fallen comrades - rather than the city itself, or its political, religious or social hierarchies. I would recommend it to those who are designing their own cities, and think they could use a little extra imagination to get things going, or to those with established city campaigns who want something new to spice it up."

In the October 1988 edition of Games International, Steve G. Jones reviewed the first three volumes of the Citybook series, and found this book "covers the widest range of the three. It ranges from inns to undertakers, but mostly contains shops that adventurers might find of interest, such as armourers and doctors." Although Jones found the material fairly dry, "The blandness of the setting makes it easy to slip into any existing campaign, while most of the characters and scenario ideas are original in spite of this." Jones didn't like that "each and every organisation has a Dark Secret. If the players find that every time they try to buy a loaf of bread the bakers are summoning the Elder Gods in the basement, the game could be getting out of hand. I would suggest downplaying this aspect for most of the places the adventurers visit, so it remains a rare surprise when it does happen."

== Awards ==
Citybook I was awarded the Origins Award for "Best Roleplaying Adventure of 1982".
