= Todd Loren =

American comic book publisher (1960-1992)

- Born: Stuart Loren Shapiro; January 14, 1960 Detroit, Michigan, U.S.
- Died: June 18, 1992 (aged 32) San Diego, California, U.S.
- Areas: Writer, Editor, Publisher
- Notable works: Musicade; Revolutionary Comics

Todd Loren (born Stuart Loren Shapiro, January 14, 1960 – June 18, 1992) was an American comic book publisher, owner of Revolutionary Comics and its title Rock 'N' Roll Comics.

== Biography ==
As a teenager, Loren promoted comic conventions and record collector shows in the Detroit area. He moved to San Diego, California in the late 1980s and started Musicade, a mail-order music memorabilia company. In 1989, he sold Musicade and started Revolutionary Comics, which produced Rock 'N' Roll Comics, a line of unauthorized comic book biographies of rock stars prompted in part by the success of an unauthorized Bruce Springsteen parody comic called Hey Boss. He hired Hey Boss artist Larry Nadolsky to draw the first issue of Rock 'N' Roll Comics, which profiled Guns N' Roses. Loren's father, Herb Shapiro was the vice president of the company operating Revolutionary Comics, Infinite One Inc.

Loren was also the first publisher of the Carnal Comics line, which is still publishing comics. From 1994 to 2000, the Carnal line was run by former Revolutionary Comics managing editor and head writer Jay Allen Sanford. The series was subsequently published by another of Loren's Revolutionary Comics artists, Steven S. Crompton, creator of Demi the Demoness.

=== Murder ===
In June 1992, at the age of 32, Loren was found stabbed to death in his San Diego condo. The case remains unsolved, although some people suspected spree killer Andrew Cunanan, as both men were well known in San Diego's gay social circles. The FBI later investigated Cunanan's possible involvement.

Loren is interred in El Camino Memorial Park, in San Diego.

=== Film ===
In 2005, Chicago-based film studio BulletProof Film released Unauthorized and Proud of It: Todd Loren's Rock 'N' Roll Comics, a documentary about Loren's life.

The film features interviews with Loren's family, comic book colleagues, adversaries, supporters, and past and present rock 'n' roll stars, including Alice Cooper. The film details the San Diego police department's investigation into the murder; interviews with Loren's coworkers and family members suggest that the police failed to follow up on all available leads. The film was released on DVD in 2012 by Wild Eye Releasing, under the title Unauthorized: The Story of Rock 'N' Roll Comics.

Appearing in the film are Alice Cooper, publishers Gary Groth (Fantagraphics) and Denis Kitchen (Kitchen Sink Press), underground painter and Revolutionary Comics cover artist Robert Williams, comic book artist Dennis Worden and musician Mojo Nixon.

== Comics writing ==
all published by Revolutionary Comics, unless otherwise noted

Rock 'N' Roll Comics

- #1 (July 1989):
  - "Guns N' Roses," with artist Larry Nadolsky
  - "Gums N' Noses," with artist Larry Nadolsky
- #2 (Aug. 1989):
  - "Metallica: The Band of the New Millennium," with artists Larry Nadolsky and Scott Goodell
  - "Megadeth," with artists Steve Goupil and Sean Konot
  - ""Metalec cha," with artist Lyndal Ferguson
  - "Hey Mon, It's... Stan Back!", with artist Larry Nadolsky
- #3 (Sept. 1989):
  - "Bon Jovi," with artists Larry Nadolsky and Scott Goodell
  - "Jon Bovi," with artist Lyndal Ferguson
  - "Stan Back," with artist Larry Nadolsky
- #4 (Oct. 1989):
  - "Mötley Crüe: West Coast Wildmen," with artists Larry Nadolsky and Johnny Childish
  - "Snotley Crue," with artist Lyndal Ferguson
  - "Stan Back," with artist Larry Nadolsky
- #5 (Nov. 1989)
  - "Def Leppard: Rocket to the Top!", with artists Larry Nadolsky and Johnny Childish
  - "Ded Lepors," with artist Ken Landgraf
- #6 (Dec. 1989):
  - "Satisfaction: The Rolling Stones," with artist Andy Kuhn
  - "Strolling Bones," with artist Ken Landgraf
  - "Stan Back," with artists Larry Nadolsky and Scott Goodell
- #7 (Jan. 1990):
  - "The Who: Long Live Rock!", with artist Thomas D. Luth
  - "Who Cares!", with artist Ken Landgraf
- #9: "PISS," with artist Ken Landgraf (Mar. 1990)
- #10: (Apr. 1990):
  - "Whitesnake: Here They Go Again," with artist Greg Fox
  - "Whiteflake," with artist Scott Jackson
- 11 (May 1990):
  - "Aerostiffs," with writer Herb Shapiro and artist Dave Garcia
  - "Stan Back," with artist Larry Nadolsky
- 12 (June 1990):
  - "New Kids on the Rag," with artist Lyndal Ferguson
  - "The History of Teenybopper Stars," with writer Herb Shapiro and artist Dan Magner
- #13: "Zed Leppelin," with artist Ken Landgraf (July 1990)
- #14 (Aug. 1990):
  - "The Bad, The Vicious, And The Rotten," with artist Marc Erickson
  - "Middlesex Pistols," with artist Ken Landgraf
  - "What If," with artist Lyndal Ferguson
- #15 (Sept. 1990):
  - "Posin'," with writer Herb Shapiro and artist Ken Landgraf
  - "The Sweet," with artist Steve Goupil
- #16 (Oct. 1990):
  - "Sammy Hagar," with artist Steve Goupil
  - "Van Hardon," with artist Ken Landgraf
  - "Stan Back," with artist Larry Nadolsky
- #17 (Nov. 1990):
  - "Lady Madonna: Her Life and Loves," with artist Greg Fox
  - "Madoodoo," with artist Lyndal Ferguson
- #18: "Ratt: Rodent Rockers Reap Rich Rewards," with artist Johnny Childish (Dec. 1990)
- #19 (Apr. 1991):
  - "Public Enemy: Fight For The Right To Fight," with artist Marc Erickson
  - "2 Live Crew: 1 Brave Mother," with artist Stuart Immonen
  - "The New Censorship," with artist Stuart Immonen
  - "The World According to Jesse Helms," with artist Tom Luth
- #21 (Feb. 1991):
  - "Prince," with artist Stuart Immomen
  - "Dr. Seuss Drug Book: Crack Is Wack," with artist Rick Brooks
  - "George Clinton," with artist Lyndal Ferguson
  - "Stan Back," with artist Michael Jan Friedman
- #22: " "Stan Back," with artist Michael Jan Friedman (Feb. 1991)
- #23 (Mar. 1991):
  - "Cutting Edge of Rock: The Electric Dead," with artist Ken Landgraf
  - "Reality vs. The Nil Flawsby Show," with writer Herb Shapiro and artist Dave Garcia
- #24: "NTV: It's NOT Music Television," with artist Scott Jackson (Mar. 1991)
- #25: "The Authorized Biography of Mojo Nixon," with artist Scott Jackson (May 1991)
- #33: "Why Didn't L.A. Guns Make It Big Like Guns N' Roses?", with artist Marc Erickson (Sept. 1991)
- #39 (Dec. 1991):
  - "Don't You Hate…," with artist Scott Jackson
  - "New Kids vs. Revolutionary," with artist Stuart Immonen

Tipper Gore's Comics and Stories

- #1 (Oct. 1989):
  - "Cutting Edge of Rock," with artist Ken Landgraf
  - "That's The Way It Is!" with artist Brad Moore
  - "Mind Over Matter," with artist Lyndal Ferguson
  - "History Lesson," with artist Mike Clift
  - "Tarry Tarry Night" with writer Herb Shapiro and artist Larry Nadolsky
- #2 (Jan. 1990):
  - "Think Or Die" with artist Mike Clift
  - "Coaster Maniac!", with artist Ken Landgraf
  - "Death By Bureaucracy," with writer Herb Shapiro and artist Ken Landgraf
  - "For The Love Of Money," with artist Lyndal Ferguson
- #3 (Mar. 1990)
  - "Dolphins," with writer Herb Shapiro
  - "Justice," with writer Herb Shapiro and artist Scott Jackson
  - "Drug Lord," with writer Herb Shapiro and artist Roy Burdine
- #4 (May 1990)
  - "The Visitor," with writer Herb Shapiro and artist Eric Recourt
  - "The Bottle," with writer Herb Shapiro and artist Scott Jackson
- #5: "Rhoads Beyond" with writer Jason Hecht (July 1990)

Other titles

- The Beatles Experience #1–8, with artists Mike Sagara and Lyndal Ferguson (Mar. 1991–May 1992)
- "Little Richard," with artist Lyndal Ferguson, in The Beatles Experience #1 (Mar. 1991)
- "Book One: Shapes of Things to Come," with writer Spike Steffenhagen and artist Scott E. Pentzer, in The Led Zeppelin Experience (Aug. 1992)
- "Chapter One," with writers Herb Shapiro & Patrick McCray, and artist Aaron Sowd, in The Elvis Presley Experience (Aug. 1992)
- "Are You Suicidal?" in Star Jam Comics #3 (Aug. 1992)
- "The Jackson Five!" in Star Jam Comics #5 (Oct. 1992)
