= Wynn Mercere =

Writer

Wynn Mercere is a pen name adopted in 2010 by writer Debora Wykle / Debora Kerr for the City of the Gods: Forgotten fantasy novel, comics and short story anthology series published by Raven Press, the City of the Gods Map Pack in the Catalyst role-playing game line published by Flying Buffalo, the 2015 magical realism novel Utopea and 2016's historical horror novel Mother of Ghosts published by Raven Press. Kerr is a writer of fiction and non-fiction as well as an editor and designer of scenarios for role playing games. Mercere's novel, City of the Gods: Forgotten, has over 80 illustrations.

== Written under the name Debora Wykle Kerr ==
- Pantheon Finale. [published in Demi #6] Carnal Comics, 2002.
- Partylines. mightywords.com, 2000.
- Peg! #1 Ashcan Edition. Archer Books and Games, 1998
- Pantheon #2. Archer Books and Games, 1997
- CityBook VII: King's River Bridge. Flying Buffalo, Inc. 1997. (editor/contributing author)
- Pantheon #1. Archer Books and Games, 1995.
- Maps II: Places Of Legend. Flying Buffalo, Inc. Scottsdale, 1994. (editor/contributing author)
- Grimtooth's Traps Bazaar. Flying Buffalo, Inc. Scottsdale, 1994. (editor/contributing author)
- Maps I: Cities. Flying Buffalo, Inc. Scottsdale, 1994. (editor/contributing author)
- Mugshots 2. Flying Buffalo, Inc. Scottsdale, 1992. (co-author with Michael Stackpole)
- The Hole Delver's Catalog. Task Force Games/Flying Buffalo, Inc. USA 1987. (contributing author)
- CityBook II: Port O’ Call. Flying Buffalo, Inc. 1984. (contributing author)
