= Rock 'N' Roll Comics =

Comic book series

- Rock 'N' Roll Comics #1, featuring Guns N' Roses (June 1989)

Publication information
- Publisher: Revolutionary Comics
- Schedule: Monthly
- Format: Ongoing series
- Genre: Underground
- Publication date: June 1989 – November 1993
- No. of issues: 63

Creative team
- Written by: Todd Loren, Dean Hsieh, Jay Allen Sanford, Robert V. Conte, Michael K. Willis
- Artist(s): Lyndal Ferguson, Greg Fox, Stuart Immonen, Scott Jackson, Ken Landgraf, Larry Nadolsky, Blackwell, Johnny, Joe Paradise, Childish, Scott E. Pentzer
- Editor(s): Todd Loren (issues #1–51); Jay Allen Sanford (issues #52–65)

Rock 'N' Roll Comics was a comic book series published by Revolutionary Comics from 1989 to 1993. Revolutionary's flagship title, the series was notable for its unauthorized and unlicensed biographies of rock stars, told in comic book form but well-researched and geared to adults, often with adult situations (nudity, drug use, violence, etc.).

Some musicians featured in the comics, like Frank Zappa and Kiss, were supportive; while others, like the New Kids on the Block, considered the comic akin to a bootleg recording and sued the publisher. Publisher Todd Loren's legal victory in the U.S. District Court established that unauthorized comic book biographies were entitled to the same protections as other unauthorized biographies.

Rock 'N' Roll Comics originally contained straight biographies in comics form and Mad magazine-style parodies (all written by Loren). The parodies were dropped after about 18 issues. Early issues also featured the Loren/Larry Nadolsky character Stan Back in a series of humorous one-page strips. Loren wrote many of the early lead stories; Jay Allen Sanford took over as lead writer with issue #22. The stories were illustrated by a grab-bag of artists without many other credits in the industry.

The series sported cover slogans reading "Unauthorized and Proud of It" or "100% Unauthorized Material". Rock 'N' Roll Comics was published in a typical 6½" × 9¾" comic book format. Issues were typically 32 pages in length, printed mostly in black-and-white with a color cover. Many covers were painted by Scott Jackson. The letters page — which often featured spirited editorials by Loren — was known as "Revolutionary Comments." Although the series is numbered through 65 issues, a total of 63 issues were released due to two issues, numbers 8 and 61, never being published due to legal challenges.

== Publication history ==
Revolutionary Comics publisher Todd Loren was inspired to launch Rock 'N' Roll Comics in part by the success of an unauthorized Bruce Springsteen parody one-shot comic called Hey Boss (Visionary Graphics, 1986).

Hey Boss artist Larry Nadolsky was hired to draw the first issue of Rock 'N' Roll Comics, profiling Guns N' Roses. Upon the comic's release, cover-dated June 1989, Guns N' Roses lawyer Peter Paterno sent Revolutionary a cease and desist order. This was reported in a Rolling Stone story that directly resulted in the entire 10,000-copy print run selling out in two weeks, thanks to buyers who thought Guns N' Roses would sue Revolutionary Comics out of existence. In actuality, no lawsuits were ever filed, and the comic went into multiple new printings, eventually totaling over 150,000 copies.

Rock 'N' Roll Comics #3 and #4, on Bon Jovi and Mötley Crüe, respectively (cover-dated Sept. 1989 and Oct. 1989), did result in legal challenges. Both bands had exclusive merchandising deals with Great Southern Productions/Winterland Productions, which threatened comics distributors over carrying the issues and got a court injunction prohibiting Revolutionary from distributing them. This forced Revolutionary to build its own distribution network outside traditional comic shops, eventually getting them into music and gift retail outlets which had never carried comics before. This independence from the comic book marketplace served the company well, as sales continued to rise from issue to issue, with their Metallica comic going into multiple print runs totaling over 75,000 copies.

Issue #8 (cover-dated Feb. 1990), featuring Skid Row, was never published, due to an injunction prompted by Great Southern. It was skipped in number sequencing; issue #9 (Kiss) was cover-dated Mar. 1990.

Issue #12 (cover-dated June 1990), featuring New Kids on the Block, resulted in a number of legal battles. (see: Litigation, below) Ironically, this and the other lawsuits garnered Revolutionary worldwide press, eventually resulting in record-breaking sales for an indie comic publisher.

Beginning with issue #19 (Public Enemy / 2 Live Crew), Rock 'N' Roll Comics was released on a biweekly basis from Jan. 1991–Mar. 1992, comprising 25 total issues.

Issue #61 (cover-dated July 1993), scheduled to be about the band Yes, was never published, and ultimately was skipped in number sequencing.

The series' final issue, #65, on "Sci-Fi Space Rockers" (Pink Floyd, Genesis, Marillion, Hawkwind, and others) was cover-dated Nov. 1993.

=== Spin-off titles ===
The popularity of Rock 'N' Roll Comics led Revolutionary to publish other music titles, most notably Rock 'N' Roll Comics Magazine (a reprint title featuring stories from past issues of Rock 'N' Roll Comics), Hard Rock Comics (a title dedicated to hard rock, heavy metal, and punk bands), and Star Jam Comics (a title dedicated to pop acts as well as actors from the television show Beverly Hills, 90210).

=== Limited series and specials ===
Revolutionary published four Experience limited series focusing entirely on individual bands or musical artists, comprising a total of 25 issues. The titles were The Beatles Experience (8 issues), The Pink Floyd Experience (5 issues), The Elvis Presley Experience (7 issues), and The Led Zeppelin Experience (5 issues).

Revolutionary also published Best of the British Invasion, a two-issue limited series featuring bands associated with the British Invasion of the 1960s.

In addition to these limited series, Revolutionary published a number of standalone music specials featuring individual artists, bands, and musical genres. These included Greatest Hits editions devoted to major rock bands, artist-specific specials, and collections highlighting broader musical movements. Several of these publications appeared during the final years of the publisher's operations in 1993 and 1994.

=== Bluewater Productions collections ===
In September 2009, 15 years after the demise of Revolutionary Comics, publisher Bluewater Productions announced it would be reprinting Revolutionary's line of music comics (including stories from Rock 'N' Roll Comics) in ten monthly volumes, averaging 250 pages each. The first collections were The Beatles Experience and Hard Rock Heroes, released in early 2010.

Many of Revolutionary's original creators participated in updating and modernizing the contents of the musical comic bios. The reprints and updates were supervised by long-time Rock 'N' Roll Comics writer/editor Jay Allen Sanford. Ultimately, Bluewater released seven titles from 2010 to 2012:

- The Beatles Experience (Feb. 2010), 240 pp. ISBN 978-1-4276-4227-1
- Hard Rock Heroes (Apr. 2010), 240 pp. ISBN 978-1-61623-924-4 — with AC/DC, Metallica, Guns N' Roses, Ozzy Osbourne/Black Sabbath, Van Halen, Megadeth, Vanilla Fudge, Queensrÿche, Motörhead, ZZ Top
- The Runaways: Joan Jett – Lita Ford (Aug. 2010), 32 pp.
- The Pink Floyd Experience (Sept. 2010), 150 pp. ISBN 978-1-61623-930-5
- The Led Zeppelin Experience (Nov. 2010), 150 pp. ISBN 978-1-61623-939-8
- The Elvis Presley Experience (Mar. 2011), 210 pp. ISBN 978-1-4507-0021-4
- Stan Lee: the Biography! (Feb. 2012), 32 pp. ISBN 978-0-9855911-2-0

Two other projected volumes, Rock 'N' Roll Cartoon History: The Sixties; and Rock 'N' Roll Cartoon History: The Seventies, remain unpublished.

== Litigation ==
Rock 'N' Roll Comics #12 (cover-date June 1990), an unauthorized biography of New Kids on the Block, resulted in Revolutionary being sued again. Publisher Loren claimed the First Amendment protected the journalistic rights of his "illustrated articles" and he took the matter to the United States District Court for the Southern District of California.

Loren set up a 900 number, "Nuke the New Kids," to raise money for the company's defense ($10.00 per call, billed by phone company). In April 1990, U.S. District Judge John S. Rhoades declared that Rock 'N' Roll Comics #12 could legally be distributed because it is "part biography and part satire." The judge's twelve-page ruling stated that "bookstores are filled with biographies — both authorized and unauthorized — of public figures. And, while the subjects of such biographies may be offended by the publication of their life stories, they generally have no claim for trademark infringement."

Rhoades' ruling also stated "It appears that the First Amendment may trump any claim that the plaintiffs have for trademark infringement." The resultant order stated that Winterland Concessions Co. failed to show that the case met the standards required to issue a preliminary injunction. This dissolved the temporary restraining order prohibiting distribution. Nonetheless, the New Kids responded by filing suit for trademark infringement since their logo appeared in the comic. A settlement between the New Kids and Revolutionary was reached in August 1990. It permanently enjoined Revolutionary from "advertising, manufacturing, distributing and/or selling or otherwise commercially exploiting any publication displaying the trademark and/or logo of the New Kids on the Block, either as a group or individually." Loren promptly reprinted the New Kids story in magazine format (Rock 'N' Roll Comics Magazine), without depicting the band's logo anywhere in the story.

== Documentary film ==
In 2005, BulletProof Film released a documentary film titled Unauthorized and Proud of It: Todd Loren's Rock 'N' Roll Comics. The film features interviews with Loren's family, surviving "Revolutionaries," comic book colleagues, adversaries, supporters and past and present rock 'n' roll stars featured in Revolutionary's comics. Appearing in the film are Alice Cooper, Mojo Nixon, publishers Gary Groth (Fantagraphics) and Denis Kitchen (Kitchen Sink Press) underground painter and cover artist Robert Williams and comic book artist Dennis Worden.

The film also details the San Diego police department's investigation into Todd Loren's 1992 murder; interviews with Loren's coworkers and family members suggest that the police failed to follow up on all available leads. The film was released on DVD in April 2012 by Wild Eye Releasing, under the title Unauthorized: The Story of Rock 'N' Roll Comics. The DVD includes over two hours of bonus footage, interviews, news footage, and art galleries, and liner notes by long-time Rock 'N' Roll Comics writer-editor Jay Allen Sanford.

== Issue guide ==
=== Rock 'N' Roll Comics ===
The following table lists the issues published in the original Rock 'N' Roll Comics series, including their publication dates, featured artists, and creative credits.

#	Cover-date	Subject	Cover artist	Writer	Story artist	Notes
1	July 1989	Guns N' Roses	?	Todd Loren	Larry Nadolsky	7 printings; 7th printing is entirely new with new color artwork and a different cover by artist Scott Jackson.
2	Aug. 1989	Metallica	Lyndal Ferguson	Todd Loren	Larry Nadolsky & Scott Goodell	6 printings; 6th printing is entirely different with new color artwork, a different cover and two new backup stories featuring Megadeth and Motorhead.
3	Sept. 1989	Bon Jovi	Lyndal Ferguson	Todd Loren	Larry Nadolsky & Scott Goodell	
4	Oct. 1989	Mötley Crüe	Lyndal Ferguson	Todd Loren	Larry Nadolsky & Johnny Childish	
5	Nov. 1989	Def Leppard	Lyndal Ferguson	Todd Loren	Larry Nadolsky & Johnny Childish	2 printings
6	Dec. 1989	The Rolling Stones	Scott Jackson	Todd Loren	Andy Kuhn	
7	Jan. 1990	The Who	Tom Luth	Todd Loren	Tom Luth	
8	Feb. 1990	Skid Row	N/A	Todd Loren	?	Prevented from being published by injunction from Great Southern Company; skipped in issue number sequencing
9	Mar. 1990	Kiss	Scott Jackson	Robert V. Conte	Greg Fox	
10	Apr. 1990	Whitesnake/ Warrant	Scott Jackson	Todd Loren/ Dean Hsieh	Greg Fox/ Dave Garcia	
11	May 1990	Aerosmith	Scott Jackson	Dean Hsieh	Greg Fox	
12	June 1990	New Kids on the Block	Lyndal Ferguson & Greg Fox	Robert V. Conte	Mitch Waxman & Greg Fox	2 printings
13	July 1990	Led Zeppelin	Scott Jackson	Mary Kelleher	Greg Fox	
14	Aug. 1990	Sex Pistols	Scott Jackson	Todd Loren	Marc Erickson	
15	Sept. 1990	Poison	Scott Jackson	Todd Loren	Greg Fox	
16	Oct. 1990	Van Halen	Scott Jackson	Todd Loren	Greg Fox	
17	Nov. 1990	Madonna	Rudy Baldacci	Todd Loren	Greg Fox	
18	Dec. 1990	Alice Cooper	Scott Jackson	Spike Steffenhagen	Steve Goupil	
19	Jan. 1991	Public Enemy/ 2 Live Crew	Stuart Immonen	Todd Loren	Marc Erickson/ Stuart Immonen	
20	Jan. 1991	Queensrÿche	Scott Jackson	Jay Allen Sanford	Ken Landgraf	
21	Feb. 1991	Prince	Scott Jackson	Todd Loren	Stuart Immonen	
22	Feb. 1991	AC/DC	Scott Jackson	Jay Allen Sanford	Mike Sagara	
23	Mar. 1991	Living Colour	Scott Jackson	Jay Allen Sanford	Greg Fox	
24	Mar. 1991	Anthrax/ Faith No More	Scott Jackson	Spike Steffenhagen/ Jay Allen Sanford	Stuart Immonen/ Larry Nadolsky	
25	Apr. 1991	ZZ Top/ Mojo Nixon	Scott Jackson	Jay Allen Sanford/ Todd Loren	Stuart Immonen/ Scott Jackson	The Mojo Nixon story was billed as the first authorized biography to appear in the series
26	May 1991	The Doors	Scott Jackson	Jay Allen Sanford	Greg Fox	The Doors, part I
27	June 1991	The Doors	Scott Jackson	Jay Allen Sanford	Greg Fox	The Doors, part II
28	June 1991	Ozzy Osbourne/Black Sabbath	Scott Jackson	Jay Allen Sanford	Marc Erickson	Ozzy Osbourne/Black Sabbath, part I
29	July 1991	Ozzy Osbourne/Black Sabbath	Scott Jackson	Jay Allen Sanford	Marc Erickson	Ozzy Osbourne/Black Sabbath, part II
30	July 1991	The Cure	Scott Jackson	Jay Allen Sanford	Greg Fox	
31	Aug. 1991	Vanilla Ice	Scott Jackson	Jay Allen Sanford	Greg Fox	
32	Aug. 1991	Frank Zappa	Scott Jackson	Jay Allen Sanford	Blackwell	
33	Sept. 1991	Guns N' Roses	Scott Jackson	Jay Allen Sanford	Johnny Childish & Mike Sagara	Billed as "Guns N' Roses '91"
34	Sept. 1991	The Black Crowes	Scott Jackson	Jay Allen Sanford	Scott E. Pentzer	
35	Oct. 1991	R.E.M.	Earl Ferguson	Jay Allen Sanford	Blackwell	
36	Oct. 1991	Michael Jackson	Stuart Immonen	Jay Allen Sanford	Chas Gillen	
37	Nov. 1991	Ice-T	Scott E. Pentzer	Jay Allen Sanford	Scott E. Pentzer & Stuart Immonen	
38	Nov. 1991	Rod Stewart	Scott Jackson	Jay Allen Sanford	Terry Dodson	
39	Dec. 1991	New Kids on the Block	Joe Paradise	Jay Allen Sanford	Marc Erickson	Billed as "The Fall of the New Kids"
40	Dec. 1991	N.W.A/Ice Cube	Earl Ferguson	Jay Allen Sanford	Joe Paradise	
41	Jan. 1992	Paula Abdul	Scott Jackson	Jay Allen Sanford	Allen Darnell Salyer	
42	Jan. 1992	Metallica	Scott Jackson	Jay Allen Sanford	Scott E. Pentzer	billed as "Metallica II"
43	Feb. 1992	Guns N' Roses	Scott Jackson	Jay Allen Sanford	Jim McWeeney	billed as "Tales from the Tour"
44	Feb. 1992	Scorpions	Scott Jackson	Jay Allen Sanford	Marshall Ross	
45	Mar. 1992	Grateful Dead	Scott Jackson	Heather Cheney & Jay Allen Sanford	Blackwell	billed as "Grateful Dead (Part One: The Summer of Love)"
46	Apr. 1992	Grateful Dead	Scott Jackson	Heather Cheney & Jay Allen Sanford	Blackwell	billed as "Grateful Dead (Part Two: The Seventies)"
47	May 1992	Grateful Dead	Scott Jackson	Jay Allen Sanford	Blackwell	Grateful Dead, part III
48	June 1992	Queen	Scott Jackson	Jay Allen Sanford	Blackwell	The cover shows the issue number as #4 instead of #48
49	July 1992	Rush	Scott Jackson	Jay Allen Sanford	Terry Pallot	
50	Aug. 1992	Bob Dylan	Scott Jackson	Jay Allen Sanford	Blackwell	Bob Dylan, Part I
51	Sept. 1992	Bob Dylan	Scott E. Pentzer	Jay Allen Sanford	Blackwell	Bob Dylan, Part II
52	Oct. 1992	Bob Dylan	Scott E. Pentzer	Jay Allen Sanford	Blackwell	Bob Dylan, Part III
53	Nov. 1992	Bruce Springsteen	Scott Jackson	Jay Allen Sanford	David Neer	
54	Dec. 1992	U2	Ken Meyer, Jr.	Jay Allen Sanford & Michael K. Willis	Dave Briggs & Tom Simmons	U2, part I
55	Jan. 1993	U2	Scott Jackson	Michael K. Willis	Dave Briggs	U2, part II
56	Feb. 1993	David Bowie	?	Jay Allen Sanford	Greg Fox	
57	Mar. 1993	Aerosmith	?	Michael K. Willis	Larry Nadolsky	billed as "Aerosmith II"
58	Apr. 1993	Kate Bush	Scott Jackson	Jay Allen Sanford	Marshall Ross	
59	May 1993	Eric Clapton	Scott Jackson	Michael K. Willis	Steven S. Crompton	
60	June 1993	Genesis	Ken Meyer, Jr.	Jay Allen Sanford	Greg Fox	
61	July 1993	Yes	N/A	?	?	Never published due to injunction from Great Southern; skipped in issue number sequencing
62	Aug. 1993	Elton John	?	Michael K. Willis	?	
63	Sept. 1993	Janis Joplin	Pete Mullins	?	Randy Silverman & Bill Williams	
64	Oct. 1993	60s San Francisco	Ken Meyer, Jr.	Jay Allen Sanford	Blackwell, Greg Fox, Scott E. Pentzer, Randy Silverman, Bill Williams	
65	Nov. 1993	Sci-Fi Space Rockers	Lyndal Ferguson	Jay Allen Sanford, Spike Steffenhagen	Greg Fox, Ken Landgraf, Terry Pallot, Marshall Ross	Featured "Pink Floyd, Genesis, Marillion, Hawkwind, and more"

== See also ==
- Behind the Music
