= Citybook VII: King's River Bridge =

Tabletop role-playing game supplement

Citybook VII: Kings River Bridge is a fantasy role-playing game supplement published by Flying Buffalo in 1997.

== Contents ==
Citybook VII: Kings River Bridge was part of the Catalyst line of game supplements.

Each book in the series, which began with CityBook: Butcher, Baker, Candlestick maker, presents a fictional business in a fantasy game world including a layout for the establishment, description, characters associated with that business and potential plot hooks. The series is designed to help Game Masters (GMs) populate their towns and cities rather than having to make them all from scratch.

The remaining books in the series focused on specific parts of town, such as fancy establishments, the seedy side of town, port city-specific locations and more. King's River Bridge details the businesses and characters that service or are near the city's river bridge.

Rather than being tied to one role-playing system, the CityBook series was a generic fantasy supplement with information that allowed its characters to be easily converted or created in any fantasy role-playing game. As such, it is still a usable supplement even though the game systems that existed when it was published have changed rules a few times.

Entries within the book are:

The Royal Tax Collector by Joseph Formichella

The Halfling Rat Catchers' Guild by James L. Walker

Mildred Al Hassan's Messengers by Don Webb

Mother Footcandle's Oil Shack by S. John Ross

The Street Cleaner by Beth Hannan Rimmels

The River Raptors by Don Webb

The Poets' Guild Training Centre by Wayne West

The Bridge Guard by Bill Kerr

Sweeney's Pie Shoppe by Bear Peters

Dirty Joe's Tavern by Anita

The Fellowship of the Moon by Seng Mah

Ron & Don's Chat & Chew by Don Webb

The Confection Connection by Kevin Crossman

Orada's Fruit Cart by Mike Keller

Adaro's Stew Cart by Mike Keller

The Guzzling Gargoyle by Joseph Formichella

Helani's Fine Timepieces by Brent Stroh

Tunki's Other Wear by Norma Blair

Blind Geoffrey's Barberie and Cauterie by S. John Ross

Skinhold's Boat Rental by Joseph Formichella

The Clothes Chest by Lisa Walker

Teeble's Found-Goods Warehouse by S. John Ross

Neela's Flower Cart by Deborah Christian

The Cornerstone Ghost by Richard Shaffstall

Fizhak's Waifs by Brent Stroh

Bridge Encounters: Zachary Smithe and Chaunce Teller by Bill Kerr

Bridge Encounters: Marla Adelwine, Keelat Angelo, Shecky Reenstein, Thomas Roe and Mary the Street Poet by Don Webb

== Publication history ==
City Book VII: King's River Bridge (1997) was prepared by Archer Books and Games. It saw print after a three-year hiatus on the City Book line, and was also the final original role-playing game supplement that Flying Buffalo published for several years. Citybook VII: Kings River Bridge was the last of Flying Buffalo's All-Systems Catalyst Supplements for role-playing games. The 112-page book was edited by Debora Kerr. ISBN 9780940244986

Authors:

- Norma Blair
- Deborah Christian
- Kevin Crossman
- Joe Formichella
- Beth Hannan Rimmels
- Mike Keller
- William Kerr
- Seng Mah
- Anita Martinez
- Jim "Bear" Peters
- S. John Ross
- Richard Shaffstall
- Brent Stroh
- Lisa Walker
- James L. Walker
- Don Webb
- Wayne West

Artists:

- Steven S. Crompton
- Liz Danforth
- Jeff Menges
- Tonia Walden
- Miguel Heredia
- Eric Shock
- Paula Schricker
- Chris Wood

== Reviews ==
- Pyramid #25 (May/June, 1997)
- Shadis #38
