= Demi the Demoness =

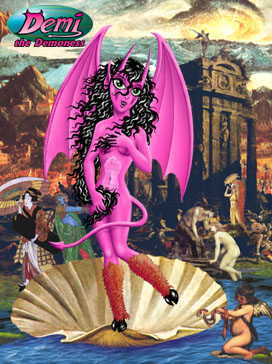
- Demi the Demoness, art by SS Crompton.

Publication information
- First appearance: Demi the Demoness #1 (Revolutionary Comics/Carnal Comics, 1992)
- Created by: SS Crompton
- Voiced by: Ellie Idol

In-story information
- Place of origin: The Rookery, Hell
- Partnerships: Vampirooni, Kit-Ra
- Abilities: mystical transport mirrors

Demi the Demoness is a fictional, humorous, erotic comics character whose fantasy adventures have been published since 1992. Demi was created by SS Crompton. Demi has appeared in numerous comics crossovers with other characters, including Shaundra, Captain Fortune, Mauvette, Vampirooni, Erika Amerika, Cassiopeia the Witch, Djustine, Crimson Gash, and adult film stars Tracey Adams, Tabitha Stevens, Deja Sin, and Bonnie Michaels.

Over 40 different Demi the Demoness comics have been published. Numerous artists and authors have worked on Demi comics over the years, including Frank Brunner, Tim Vigil, Seppo Makinen, Philo, Ryan Vella, Gus Norman, Enrico Teodorani, Silvano, Diego Simone, Jay Allen Sanford, and many others. Demi has also been the subject of T-shirts, dice, a trading card set, a resin model kit, and a movie. In 2025 CBR (Comic Book Resources) ranked Demi the Demoness as the 19th best adult comic series of all time.

== Publication history ==
Demi the Demoness first appeared in Demi the Demoness #1 by Revolutionary Comics' Carnal Comics imprint in 1992. After the publisher, Todd Loren, was murdered, the series moved to underground comic publisher Rip Off Press from 1993 to 1997. Eight more Demi comics were published with Rip Off Press, including a trade paperback collection and a choose-your-own-adventure book.

Demi was then published by Re-Visionary Press, the company that took over the Carnal Comics imprint. Re-Visionary published six more Demi titles from 1997 to 2000. Demi's ribald adventures were also published in full-color in Oui magazine from 1996 to 1998.

Carnal spun off from Re-Visionary in 2000; since then, Demi has been published in more than 20 more comics by Carnal. Demi has also appeared in comics published by Eros Comix, MU Press, Hippy Comix, and several smaller publishing ventures.

In 2024 a successful Kickstarter was launched by Carnal Comics & Discordia Publishing for a 360 page omnibus collection of Demi series. The art was enhanced, toned and additional pages were added by Demi's creator/artist S.S Crompton.

Demi stories have been translated into Swedish and Italian.

== Character biography ==
Raised in one of the few "sanctuaries" in Hell, the Rookery was a relatively safer place to be compared to other areas of Hell. Demi was raised there, so she never experienced the cruelty that most other demons have gone through. Thus, her personality is charming and naïve.

After a Demon army attacked the Rookery, Demi escaped and found the pyramid of Kit-Ra, a banished cat goddess. Kit-Ra took Demi in and she has lived there ever since. She regularly uses Kit-Ra's mystical transport mirrors to visit other worlds and times outside of Hell.

Since 1995, Demi has been involved with numerous crossovers with other American comic creator's characters. Such crossovers include Djustine, Crimson Gash, Shaundra, Captain Fortune, Vampirooni, Erika Amerika, Cassiopeia the Witch, Mauvette the Bunny, The Nightrunners, Psycho Hunter, and several others.

== In other media ==
A Demi the Demoness movie was released on DVD in May 2008. The film was co-written by SS Crompton and Steve Steele, and directed by Steele. The film stars Ellie Idol as Demi, Sinn Sage as Vampirooni, and Audrey Elson as Lyssa the Witch.

== Bibliography ==
- Demi the Demoness #1 (Revolutionary/Carnal, 1992)
- Demi the Demoness #2–4 (Rip Off Press, 1993–1997)
- Demi the Demoness #5 (Revisionary/Carnal, 1999)
- Demi the Demoness #6–8 (Carnal Comics, 2002–2023)
- Demi Adventure Special (Rip Off Press, 1995)
- Demi: Erotic Saga Graphic Novel (Rip Off Press, 1996)
- Demi Saga of a Demoness (Carnal Comics, 2006)
- Pantheon #1–3 (Archer Books, 1995–1997)
- Demi Meets Cassiopeia #1 (Rip Off Press, 1997)
- Demi & Capt. Fortune #1 (Rip Off Press, 1997)
- Demi & Shaundra #1 (Rip Off Press, 1997)
- Demi's Wild Kingdom Adventure (Carnal/MU Press, 2000)
- Sex Squad #1–2 (Carnal Comics, 2003–2004)
- Demi & Vampirooni #1 (Carnal Comics, 2006)
- Demi Hardcore #1–3 (Eros Comix, 1999–2005)
- Demi's Strange Bedfellows #1–6 (Carnal Comics, 2001–2021)
- Carnal Comics: The Inside Story (Carnal Comics, 2004)
- Demi's Rear Entry #11 (Eros Comics, 2005)
- Demi's Pin-Up Diary (Carnal Comics, 2007)
- Demi the Demoness Movie (Carnal Comics/MSD, 2008)
- Demi meets the Crimson Gash (Carnal Comics, 2008)
- Girl meets Tentacle (Demi co-star) #1 (Carnal Comics, 2010)
- Demi & the Sex Squad Giant Size #1 (Carnal Comics, 2011)
- Roxy Ramjet One Day in Hell (Demi Cameo) #1 (3rd Nip, 2012)
- SS Crompton's Lost Comics #1 (Demi scene) (Raven Press, 2013)
- Demi vs the Monsters of the 3rd Reich #1 (Carnal Comics, 2014)
- Demi's Rarities #1 (Carnal Comics, 2018)
- Cthulhu Crisis #1 (Raven Press, 2019)
- Cthulhu Crisis Rise of the Yellow Wizard GN (Zimrala Press, 2024)
- Cthulhu Crisis #2 (Zimrala Press, 2024)
- Demi Demoness Omnibus Vol 1 (Carnal Comics, Discordia, 2025)
