= Carnal Comics =

Adults-only comic book imprint

- Parent company: Revolutionary Comics (1992–1993); Re-Visionary Press (1994–2001); Opus Graphics (2001 to present)
- Founded: 1992
- Founder: Todd Loren
- Country of origin: United States
- Headquarters location: San Diego, California
- Key people: Jay Allen Sanford, SS Crompton
- Publication types: Comic books
- Fiction genres: Erotic comics

Carnal Comics is an American adult comics imprint established in 1992. Carnal Comics' flagship title is Carnal Comics: True Stories Of Adult Film Stars, which features autobiographies co-created with porn stars.

Since the line’s inception, over 100 Carnal Comics have been published, including several crossovers with other adult comic publishers (Rip Off Press, Mu Press, Eros Comics and others). Carnal claims to have sold over a million comic books, and their late 90s series Triple-X Cinema: A Cartoon History was reported to be the best-selling adult comic ever carried by Diamond Comic Distributors, for decades the leading (and essentially only) full-service United States comic book distributor. Carnal’s comics were the first monthly comics widely carried in adult novelty boutiques and their inclusion in large-scale mail order catalogs like Adam & Eve’s enabled the line to sell in numbers previously unheard of for standard 32-page adult comics.

At its peak, Carnal also had a color section in each issue of Oui on newsstands, and its stars were doing regular TV and radio promotions on shows with Howard Stern, Jenny Jones, and others. Ads for the comics even infiltrated mainstream magazines, earning the company some notoriety and, in at least one case, inclusion in a stack of comic contraband taken during a police raid of a retail comic shop.

== History ==
=== Revolutionary Comics ===
Carnal Comics was initially created to be an adult comic imprint for San Diego–based Revolutionary Comics, which in 1991 was riding high on the popularity of their flagship title Rock 'N' Roll Comics. Publisher Todd Loren received a comic submission from Rock ‘N’ Roll Comics creator Lyndal Ferguson for an erotic anthology series called Sexpot featuring short, expressionistic (and X-rated) stories. Around the same time, an illustrator named SS Crompton submitted some sketches in hope of landing assignments with Revolutionary Comics, including a drawing of a sexy character dubbed Demi the Demoness.

Loren, who had recently expanded his comic line to include non-biographical titles, decided to launch an adults-only imprint to publish Ferguson’s comic and one featuring full-length adventures of Crompton’s Demi character. Revolutionary contributor Allen Salyer created a third adult title, Pineapple Perfume, and Loren announced the three comics’ impending publication in other Revolutionary titles.

The first three Carnal Comics were to be printed and released all at once, but Revolutionary’s printer objected to what it perceived as “demonic” content in Demi The Demoness and refused to work on it. That job was moved to a Canadian printer (who later earned all of Revolutionary’s substantial business) and the three inaugural Carnal Comics were finally released in 1992.

In 1994, Revolutionary was being run by Loren’s father Herb Shapiro and the company’s managing editor Jay Allen Sanford. The band Kiss was working with the company on a three-issue comic series, and around this time Kiss bassist Gene Simmons invited several staffers to his birthday party in Los Angeles. Sanford has reported that Simmons had once, previously, suggested that the company do “Jesus or porn star comics”, and in fact the notion of porn star bios had come up shortly after Todd Loren’s death. Sanford and editor Patrick McCray discussed reviving the Carnal Comics name to do porn star bios, but the idea was abandoned when it became clear that making deals with the stars themselves would be too great a challenge and Revolutionary Comics was already putting out upwards of a half dozen comics per month.

At Simmons’ party, numerous porn stars were present and apparently the notion of Carnal Comics: True Stories Of Adult Film Stars took off there. Sanford soon announced that Revolutionary had signed porn star Sarah Jane Hamilton to co-script a three-issue series, telling her life story. Each issue would also have a second fictional story scripted by Sarah Jane herself, taking place in different time periods and featuring the popular British redhead meeting up (and getting intimate) with various historical figures. Sarah Jane herself participated with in-person promotions like a hugely attended press party in April 1994 at Golden Apple Comics, L.A.’s biggest comic shop, as well as appearing at events like GlamourCon, Erotica L.A. and the famed San Diego Comic Convention. By its second issue, "Carnal Comics: True Stories Of Adult Film Stars" was selling in numbers almost as high as Rock ‘N’ Roll Comics (which, while in decline along with all U.S. publishers at the time, were still selling around 15,000 to 20,000 copies per issue).

=== Re-Visionary Press ===
In summer 1994, Revolutionary Comics’ publisher Herb Shapiro decided to close the company, in part because of debt accrued by a failed color sports comic line. Managing Editor Jay Allen Sanford made a deal to acquire rights to the Carnal title and formed a company called Re-Visionary Press to publish the series. His common-law wife Heather Dawn designed the company logo and the third porn star Carnal Comic, Sarah Jane Hamilton #3, was published from the couple’s home in La Mesa, California, before they’d even been able to set up a computer or company phone line (the editorial column was typeset on a typewriter).

From that point forward, each month saw the release of a new Carnal Comic, each one featuring a different star (no more multiple parts for a single woman), and before long the company expanded to doing several titles per month. Company principals Sanford and Dawn were the main creators, working with a wide spectrum of contributors from the now-defunct Revolutionary Comics, newcomers, and even some well-known mainstream creators like Pat Broderick, Kevin Breyfogle, and Grateful Dead album cover painter Phil Garris.

Re-Visionary’s flagship title was formally christened Carnal Comics: True Stories Of Adult Film Stars, Told By The Stars Themselves.

The first Carnal Comic to carry only the Re-Visionary logo was Tyffany Million #1. Million had been popular as a former pro wrestler for G.L.O.W. (Gorgeous Ladies of Wrestling) and the issue sold very well, as did subsequent issues which were released every 30 days.

The Million issue, and many early Carnal Comics, were drawn by a female artist calling herself Fauve — she was later known by her real name, Holly Golightly). Sanford met Fauve at a Pittsburgh comic convention and decided her sensual artwork was perfect for the comic. Her first published work would be for Carnal. She drew for all three Sarah-Jane issues and she went on to become a well-known and popular illustrator and writer, even contributing eventually to Archie Comics. She currently publishes her own comic book titles under the Broadsword Comics banner, assisted by Catwoman artist Jim Balent.

In the late nineties, Carnal expanded and began launching additional titles, sometimes several per month, such as Porn Star Fantasies, Superstars Of Erotica, The Golden Age Of Triple-X (adaptation of vintage adult films), the psychosexual horror series Nightingale: Mistress Of Dreams and many others.

Many stores and municipalities still considered Carnal’s publications obscenity and sometimes issues were seized by police and border officials as such. Advertising outside the adult magazine market was a challenge, as newspapers and magazines often rejected Carnal ads because of the sexual nature of the comics, without ever inspecting copies of the comics themselves. One comic book store, Planet Comics and Science Fiction Store, in Oklahoma City, was raided by police in September 1995, and copies of Carnal Comics, Verotika, Eros Comics, and others were used in a court case that eventually caused the shop to be shut down.

Re-Visionary’s major 1997 project was a three-issue series called Triple-X Cinema: A Cartoon History. Scripted by Jay Allen Sanford, participating in its creation were dozens of the major figures of the erotic film industry including Marilyn Chambers, Bill Margold, Hyapatia Lee, Porsche Lynn, Nina Hartley, Seka, Kay Parker and dozens more producers and performers, including the elusive Gerard Damiano, who directed the original Deep Throat film.

Re-Visionary was placing its adults-only line in places that had never been exposed to comics before. A big boost came from joining forces with Adam & Eve, at that time the largest mail order catalog of adult merchandise in the world. Adam & Eve even had their own cable network, so this provided the line with real growth. The women who starred in Carnal Comics were promoting the line on Spice (the channel owned by Adam and Eve), the Playboy Channel, and TV shows like The Jerry Springer Show and Geraldo, and the comics generated positive press in Hustler, Chic, High Society, Screw, Adult Video News, and dozens of other major magazines.

Carnal Comics was spun off into a comic strip version as well. Sanford began producing a multi-page, full-color version of "Porn Star Fantasies" for various adult magazines, most notably Oui Magazine, one of the four top-selling men's periodicals at the time. Heather Dawn provided hand-painted colors for R-rated versions of Carnal’s best X-rated stories. Oui's Carnal Comics ran for almost two years and Carnal produced similar color strips for Hustler Humor, Adult Cinema Review, New Rave, Dirty, and others.

Publishers in several countries bought exclusive licenses to reprint Carnal Comics, such as Christos Koudakis & Associates, which has the exclusive rights to publish 48-page magazine versions of Re-Visionary’s adults-only line in Greece. The Greek version of Carnal Comics has its covers feature paintings by famed movie poster and book cover artist Boris Vallejo.

Around early 1999, the Carnal line was gradually shutting down. In the 2004 book Carnal Comics: The Inside Story, publisher Sanford said:

I was suffering from my second bout with illness in two years, and my health was not improving. My romantic liaisons with various porn stars had disillusioned me in regard to most aspects of the business... One day, I was watching TV when a porn star lover of mine brought up our relationship on The Jerry Springer Show. I hadn’t been given any warning that this was coming and I decided on the spot that, when my life is being discussed on TV with Jerry Springer, it's definitely time to change my life.

=== Opus Graphics ===
In 2001, Re-Visionary Press handed over the Carnal Comics imprint to Opus Graphics, the firm set up by Crompton to publish its titles. Though no longer on a monthly schedule, Carnal Comics still produces several titles per year, including fantasy-based comics like Demi the Demoness, Djustine, Calavera, Strange Bedfellows and occasional biographical comics on stars such as Jenna Jameson, Felecia, Aurora Snow, and Tricia Devereaux.

== Contributing creators ==
A number of well-known artists have contributed to the Carnal line. Album cover painter Phil Garris painted one of the most iconic images of all time – the fiddle-playing skeleton on the cover of the Grateful Dead’s Blues for Allah album. Garris (also known for famed covers for Toto, Steve Miller and others) painted two Carnal covers, one for Aja #1 and another for a comic on porn star Savannah. X-Men and Micronauts artist Pat Broderick drew stories on Brittany Andrews and duo Summer Cummings & Skye Blue, while Batman artist Kevin Breyfogle drew a number of Carnal issues. Creator-owned Carnal editions have been launched by one-time Howard the Duck and Doctor Strange artist Frank Brunner and Stickboy creator Dennis Worden.

Painter Jeff Pittarelli – who went on to work with Traci Lords – did many Carnal covers, as did Jamie Murray (best known for book covers for series featuring Star Wars and TV’s Beauty & The Beast). Popular pinup painter Todd Borenstein also contributed several Carnal cover portraits (Letha Weapons, Christi Lake, Roxy Rider, etc.). The very first Carnal comic to feature a porn star – Sarah-Jane Hamilton #1 – sported a cover by Ken Meyer, Jr. (Ghost Rider, Magic: The Gathering, etc).

Author and cartoonist Jay Allen Sanford is an American author and cartoonist best known for his work with Revolutionary Comics, the San Diego Reader, and Pacific Comics. He began writing the comic book Rock ‘N’ Roll Comics (created by Todd Loren) in 1989 as of the title's second issue, and still oversees the rock comic reprints published by Bluewater Productions and others.

== Film crossovers ==
Carnal also delved into actual filmmaking. The first was a combination comic book and film called Sordid Stories, starring Annabel Chong as superhero Pink Stiletto (Chong later gained fame doing the first World’s Biggest Gangbang). Sanford scripted the film and comic and the film was produced by Amazing Pictures and John Bowen, a.k.a. John T. Bone (known for his sexploitation/sci-fi film projects). Sordid Stories was nominated for two Adult Video News Awards (the adult industry’s Oscar equivalent), and more filmmakers began contacting Re-Visionary about storyboarding and other pre-production work. Before long, Carnal was doing full film treatments and shooting scripts, most all of them based around fantasy and science fiction storylines.

Another comic/film project was a superhero thriller from Wicked Pictures, known for their high-gloss, big-budget adult features, starring Jenna Jameson, then the best-known and most-popular porn star in the world. The half-million dollar movie was shot on film (a rarity in adult movies). As with Sordid Stories, the Wicked Weapon comic book and video were released and cross promoted simultaneously in the comic and adult boutique markets. Carnal also produced a special 16-page mini-comic which was included with the entire initial video run of the big-budget adult film Wicked Weapon, packaged with the video itself, now one of the rarest of all Carnal publications. The Wicked Weapon video was nominated for five AVN awards, increasing Carnal’s credibility and reputation in the adult marketplace even more. By this point, Carnal was long past calling prospective subjects to work with - they had a year-long waiting list of girls clamoring to be in a Carnal comic book.

For its next comic/films Carnal teamed up with former porn legend Veronica Hart, who was directing two movies featuring comeback appearances by women who'd long been out of the adult film business but whose names were still legendary - Ginger Lynn and Marilyn Chambers. Chambers' last X-rated film had been 1980's Insatiable. She remained in the public eye with R-rated TV series on HBO, Cinemax, The Playboy Channel and more. Lynn had retired from hardcore in 1986 and gone on to some success in films like the Vice Academy series and music videos. Chambers’ new film was to be called Still Insatiable, while Lynn’s was called Torn. Both were filmed by VCA Pictures, known for lavish, groundbreaking and expensive feature films and an exclusive stable of the industry’s most-popular performers. Carnal’s official comic book souvenir magazines based on the two most-heavily promoted films in X-rated history were the company’s best sellers since Triple-X Cinema: A Cartoon History.

In May 2008 Carnal's longest-running character Demi the Demoness was released on DVD as a live-action movie. The adults-only film, directed by Steve Steele and co-written by current Carnal publisher and Demi-creator SS Crompton, featured Demi and co-star Vampirooni fighting an evil but beautiful witch. The film starred Ellie Idol as Demi the Demoness, Sinn Sage as Vampirooni and Audrey Elson as Lyssa the Witch.
