= Dennis Worden =

American comic book writer and artist

- Born: Los Angeles, California, United States
- Areas: Cartoonist, Publisher
- Notable works: Stickboy
- Archived 1 August 2015 at the Wayback Machine

Dennis Worden is an American comic book writer and artist best known as the creator of the comic book Stickboy.

Worden's alternative comics caught the public's attention in the early 1980s, via Robert Crumb's Weirdo comics anthology, for which he was a frequent contributor throughout the magazine's run. During that same period, Worden was a regular contributor to the comics anthology Rip Off Comix. Worden has the distinction of being the only male cartoonist to ever contribute to the all-female underground comix anthology Tits & Clits Comix.

He created the comic book Stickboy, detailing the existential adventures of a stick figure. There were eight issues, published, successively by Fantagraphics (issues #1–3, 1988–1990), Revolutionary Comics (issues #4–5, 1990–1992), Starhead Comix (issues #6–7, 1993–1995), and Carnal Comics (issue #8, 2005).

Other comic books by Worden include Slur (self-published, 1982), Bongo Dick (self-published, 1986), Suburban Teens On Acid (self-published, 1986), Pedestrian Vulgarity (Fantagraphics, 1990), and Acidboy (Starhead Comix, 1996). He also did the character The Floating Skull, who appears in Heavy Metal Monsters (Revolutionary Comics, 1992), one story of which the Floating Skull appears on the David Letterman show.

In 1993, Worden shot a Stickboy music video with two songs by the English punk bank Rancid Hell Spawn.

Worden appears in 2005 documentary film Unauthorized and Proud Of It — a.k.a. The Story of Rock 'N' Roll Comics — alongside Alice Cooper, Mojo Nixon, Gene Simmons, painter Robert Williams, publishers Denis Kitchen and Gary Groth, cartoonists Mary Fleener, Cynthia Plaster Caster, and others. The film, featuring a soundtrack by Elvis Costello (among others), was released on DVD in 2012.
