= Wilderness Encounters Book =

Wilderness Encounters Book is a 1991 role-playing supplement published by Flying Buffalo.

== Contents ==
Wilderness Encounters Book is a supplement in which lairs with encounters for 13 different creatures are included.

== Publication history ==
Wilderness Encounters Book is part of the Catalyst fantasy supplement series.

== Reception ==
Christopher Earley reviewed Wilderness Encounters Book (Volume 1) in White Wolf #29 (Oct./Nov., 1991), rating it a 2 out of 5 and stated that "Wilderness Encounters is a legitimate campaign utility, provided your players are not too jaded or too 'sophisticated' to willingly devolve a few years from the state of the art in roleplaying and delve into these dark holes to fight their creepy inhabitants."

== Reviews ==
- Dragon #180
