= Personality Comics =

Defunct American comic book publisher

- Status: Defunct, 1993 (33 years ago)
- Founded: 1991 (35 years ago)
- Founder: Adam Post and Eric Shefferman
- Country of origin: United States
- Headquarters location: Massapequa, New York then Melville, New York
- Key people: Adam Post (president); Eric Shefferman (publisher); Alex Ryley (director of operations); Michele Howell (story editor); Kirk Lindo (editor in chief); Steve Thorakos (Graphic and Production Artist); Robert Schnakenberg; John Tartaglione
- Publication types: Comic books
- Nonfiction topics: Sports, music, pop culture
- Fiction genres: Superhero parody, Adult comics
- Imprints: Spoof Comics; Friendly Comics others (see full list below)
- No. of employees: 30

Personality Comics was a short-lived American comic book publishing company that specialized in unauthorized biographies of entertainers and professional athletes, adult comics, and parodies, frequently combining all three genres.

Operating from 1991 to 1993, the company published a myriad of titles under a variety of imprint labels. A typical Personality Comics title featured a painted portrait of the subject on the cover, with black-and-white art inside. (Many of Personality's titles were not comics per se, as they were primarily text with illustrations rather than sequential art.) Regular contributors included Robert Schnakenberg, Mark Caraballo, Hector Diaz, Neil Feigeles, and Pat Henkel. Notable creators associated with the company included John Tartaglione, Jimmy Palmiotti, Barry Blair, Fred Hembeck, and Adam Hughes.

Originally based in Massapequa, New York, the company later moved to Melville, New York.

== History ==
Adam Post and Eric Shefferman, long-time friends and recent college graduates, formed Personality Comics at the height of the comic speculator boom in 1991, to take advantage of the popularity of erotic comics as exemplified by Fantagraphics' Eros Comics line, and biographical comics as exemplified by Revolutionary Comics' Rock 'N' Roll Comics series. Without much background in the industry, they hired industry veteran John Tartaglione to help guide their development as a company (and provide art on some titles). They expanded quickly, mostly hiring inexperienced creators at fairly low rates.

The industry's largest distributor, Diamond Comic Distributors — wary of legal issues related to the company's unauthorized biography lines — refused to carry Personality's titles; but the second largest distributor, Capital City Distribution, did carry the company's books, making sure their titles reached comic book specialty stores and newsstands. (Later, Diamond reversed its decision not to distribute Personality's titles.)

The company's first title, released under the Friendly Comics imprint, was an X-rated series called Bambi and Friends, written by co-founders Post and Shefferman and drawn by Myke Maldonado. Debuting in January 1991, Bambi and Friends eventually published eight monthly issues, and then a number of follow-up limited series featuring the same character.

In March 1991, the company released its flagship title, Personality Comics Presents, featuring supermodel Paulina Porizkova. The title's second issue, featuring Traci Lords, was particularly popular. The company's Sports Personalities series debuted with a July 1991 issue, featuring Bo Jackson (that series eventually ran 14 issues). Not all of the company's biography comics were unauthorized; as Post claimed, "DeForest Kelley... and Kim Basinger had sent autographed copies of their biographies, and... Walter Koenig... had edited his."

Within a short time, the publisher found great success, putting out over 30 different comics per month, making it the eighth-largest comics publisher in the United States by the summer of 1992.

In the summer of 1992, the company created the Spoof Comics parody imprint, headlined by Spoof Comics Presents, which eventually ran 19 issues. The vast majority of the Spoof imprint titles featured eroticized parodies of popular DC Comics and Marvel Comics heroes, represented as female regardless of their original gender.

Personality's head writer was Robert Schnakenberg, who authored more than 50 comics under a variety of pseudonyms. The company's Cutting Edge Productions imprint was edited by editor-in-chief Kirk Lindo, "who would achieve greater notoriety" at Everette Hartsoe's London Night Studios. Lindo spearheaded the company's line of aspirational superhero titles, such as the Black character Rescueman and a super-powered character who worked to ameliorate the HIV/AIDS crisis.

=== Closure ===
In February 1993, Personality announced that it had acquired the rights to the hobbyist magazine Amazing Heroes, which had ceased publishing in July 1992, with plans to revive it in the summer of 1993. Nothing came of this, however, as the comics speculator market collapsed, and Personality accrued huge debts, essentially shutting down by the summer of 1993 (with the rights to Amazing Heroes eventually reverting to Fantagraphics). Altogether, Personality Comics published nearly 80 titles and over 200 individual issues.

In early 1994, Post and Sheffernan, along with Revolutionary Comics, and Diamond and Capital City distributors, settled a lawsuit brought by football player Joe Montana based on both company's unauthorized biographies of him and the use of his likeness. (In Personality's case, the issue in question was Football Heroes #3, published in 1992.)

=== Post-Personality ===
As Personality wound down in 1993, Post and Shefferman formed the superhero publisher Triumphant Comics (a division of Corporate Kingdom Holdings, Inc.), based in East Farmingdale, New York. Triumphant promoted its news titles with ashcan editions with print runs of 50,000. The company's longest-running titles were Scavengers (12 issues, July 1993–May 1994), The Chromium Man (11 issues, April 1994–May 1994), and Riot Gear (9 issues, 1993–1994). Notable creators associated with Triumphant included Greg Fox. The company collapsed in late 1994 with huge debts, both corporate and personal to Post and Shefferman.

In 1995, Post founded yet another new publisher: Pop Comics (legally known as Whitney Publishing Company), which, like Personality, focused on biographical comics. (David Campiti, later co-founder of Innovation Publishing, was Pop Comics' art director.) Despite using established creators like Adam Hughes, Jimmy Palmiotti, and Bill Sienkiewicz, Pop Comics never got off the ground because Diamond Comic Distributors again refused to carry the company's titles.

In 1996–1998, Post ran another new publisher — Angel Entertainment (a.k.a. Adam Post, Inc.), based in El Jobean, Florida — which, like Personality, specialized in erotic comics; titles included Vampire Girl, Angel Girl, Dream Angel, and Secret Files. The company's longest running-titles were Forbidden Vampire Tales (7 issues), Vampire Girls: Erotique (6 issues), and Bloodhound (4 issues).

In 2013, Bluewater Productions published the comic Fame: Jackie Robinson, a reprint of a Personality Comics issue from 1992. The comic was edited by Adam Post and co-branded with Personality Comics, long after the company had gone defunct.

== Imprints and titles (selected) ==
=== Unauthorized biographies ===
Imprints: Celebrity Comics, (debuted Jan. 1992) Personality Comics

- The New Crew (11 issues, July 1991 – October 1992, plus an annual) – profiles of actors from Star Trek: The Next Generation television series, including Denise Crosby, LeVar Burton, Gates McFadden, Marina Sirtis, and Michael Dorn
- The Original Crew (12 issues, June 1991 – summer 1992, plus an annual) – profiles of actors from the original Star Trek television series, including William Shatner, Leonard Nimoy, DeForest Kelley, James Doohan, Majel Barrett, Mark Lenard and Walter Koenig
- Personality Classics (4 issues, 1991) – profiles of John Wayne, Marilyn Monroe, Elvis Presley, and James Dean
- Personality Comics Presents (18 issues, March 1991 – summer 1992) – profiles included Paulina Porizkova and Cassandra Peterson
- Secret Agents (3 issues, Nov. 1991 – Jan. 1992) — profiles of James Bond actors Sean Connery, Roger Moore, and Timothy Dalton
- Teen Comics (6 issues, Sept. 1992 – Mar. 1993) — profiles of teen idols like Shannen Doherty, Luke Perry, the cast of Melrose Place, Mark Wahlberg, Madonna, and Prince

==== Music ====
- The Beatles (4 issues, November 1991 – February 1992)
- Guns N' Roses (2 issues, 1992)
- Kiss (2 issues, Apr. 1992 – June 1992)
- Led Zeppelin (4 issues, 1992)
- Madonna (2 issues, Sept. 1991 – fall 1991)
- Madonna: Sex Goddess (4 issues, 1992) — focus on the singer's renegade sexuality
- Music Comics (5 issues, 1991 – 1992) – profiles of Kiss, Red Hot Chili Peppers, Elvis Presley, The Cure, and Metallica
- Pink Floyd (3 issues, 1992)
- Rock Classics (2 issues, 1992)
- Rolling Stones (3 issues, 1992)

==== Sports ====
- Baseball Classics (3 issues, 1992) — profiles of Frank Thomas, Lou Gehrig, and Willie Mays
- Baseball Sluggers (4 issues, 1992) — profiles of Ken Griffey Jr., David Justice, Frank Thomas, and Don Mattingly
- Best Pitchers (3 issues, 1992) — profiles of Nolan Ryan, Dwight Gooden, and Roger Clemens
- Football Heroes (3 issues, 1992) — profiles of Joe Namath, John Elway, and Joe Montana
- Shaquille O'Neal vs. Michael Jordan (2 issues, 1992) — profiles and comparisons of Shaquille O'Neal and Michael Jordan
- Slam Dunk Kings (4 issues, 1992) — profiles of Michael Jordan, David Robinson, Patrick Ewing, and Charles Barkley
- Sports Classics (5 issues, December 1991 – September 1992) – profiles included Babe Ruth and Mickey Mantle
- Sports Comics (5 issues, 1992) – profiles included Ken Griffey Jr., Magic Johnson, Kirby Puckett and Riddick Bowe
- Sports Personalities (14 issues, July 1991 – 1992)

=== Erotic titles ===
Imprints: AC Adult Comics, Friendly Comics

- Bad Girls (3 issues, 1992)
- Bambi and Friends (9 issues, January – September 1991)
- Bambi the Hunter (5 issues, 1992)
- Bambi in Heat (3 issues, 1992)
- Female Fantasies (4 issues, 1992)
- Female Sex Pirates (2 issues, 1992)
- The Paddler (3 issues, 1992) – x-rated parody of Marvel Comics' Punisher
- Sapphire: The City of Sin (1 issue, 1992)
- Sex Trek (3 issues, 1992) – x-rated parody of Star Trek: The Original Series
- Sex Trek: The Next Infiltration (3 issues, 1992) – x-rated parody of Star Trek: The Next Generation
- Sex Trek: To Boldly Go (3 issues, 1992) – x-rated parody of Star Trek: The Original Series
- X-Shemales (2 issues, 1992)
- XXX-Women (3 issues, Jan. – March 1992) – x-rated parody of the X-Men
- XXX Women: Phallus Rising (3 issues, 1992)
- XXX-Women: A Woman's Work (1 issue, 1992)

=== Parody titles ===
Imprints: Spoof Comics, Humor Comics (debuted Feb. 1992)

- Bloodskirt (1 issue, 1992) — erotic-tinged parody of DC's Bloodsport
- Big Berd versus Arnold Schwarzenheimer (2 issues, 1992) – parody battle between Big Bird and Arnold Schwarzenegger
- Cyberfemmes (1 issue, 1992)
- Fantastic Femmes
- Kisses (1 issue, Dec. 1992) — "what if"-style comic about a female version of the band Kiss – by Allan Jacobsen
- Punish-Her Score Journal (1 issue, May 1993) – erotic-tinged parody of Marvel's The Punisher War Journal
- Soul Trek (2 issues, 1992) – Blaxploitation-style mashup of Star Trek and Soul Train written by Robert Schnakenberg; now part of the permanent collection of The Museum of Uncut Funk, a virtual museum "dedicated to the celebration and preservation of the Funk."
- Spoof Comics Presents (19 issues, July 1992 – July 1993) – spoofs of popular DC Comics and Marvel Comics superheroines
- WildC.h.i.c.k.s (1 issue, 1992) – parody of Image Comics' WildC.A.T.s.
- Wolverbroad vs. Hobo (1 issue, 1992) – parody battle between Marvels' Wolverine and DC's Lobo
- X-Babes (1 issue, 1993) – parody of the X-Men written by Robert Schnakenberg
- Youngspud (1 issue, 1992) – erotic-tinged parody of Image Comics' Youngblood

=== Superheroes and science fiction ===
Imprints: Best Comics (debuted Oct. 1991), Cutting Edge Productions

- Balloonatics (1 issue, Oct. 1991)
- Rescueman (1 issue, Aug. 1992) — Black superhero comic by Kirk Lindo
- Vortex the Wonder Mule (3 issues, 1992) — by Michael Halbleib

=== Nonfiction ===
Imprints: Bible Comics, Real Life Comics

- Healthman: The AIDS Crisis (1 issue, 1992) — written by Robert Schnakenberg
- The Story of Jesus (1 issue, 1992)

== See also ==
- Revolutionary Comics
- Boneyard Press
- The Big Book Of
