= Robert Schnakenberg =

American writer

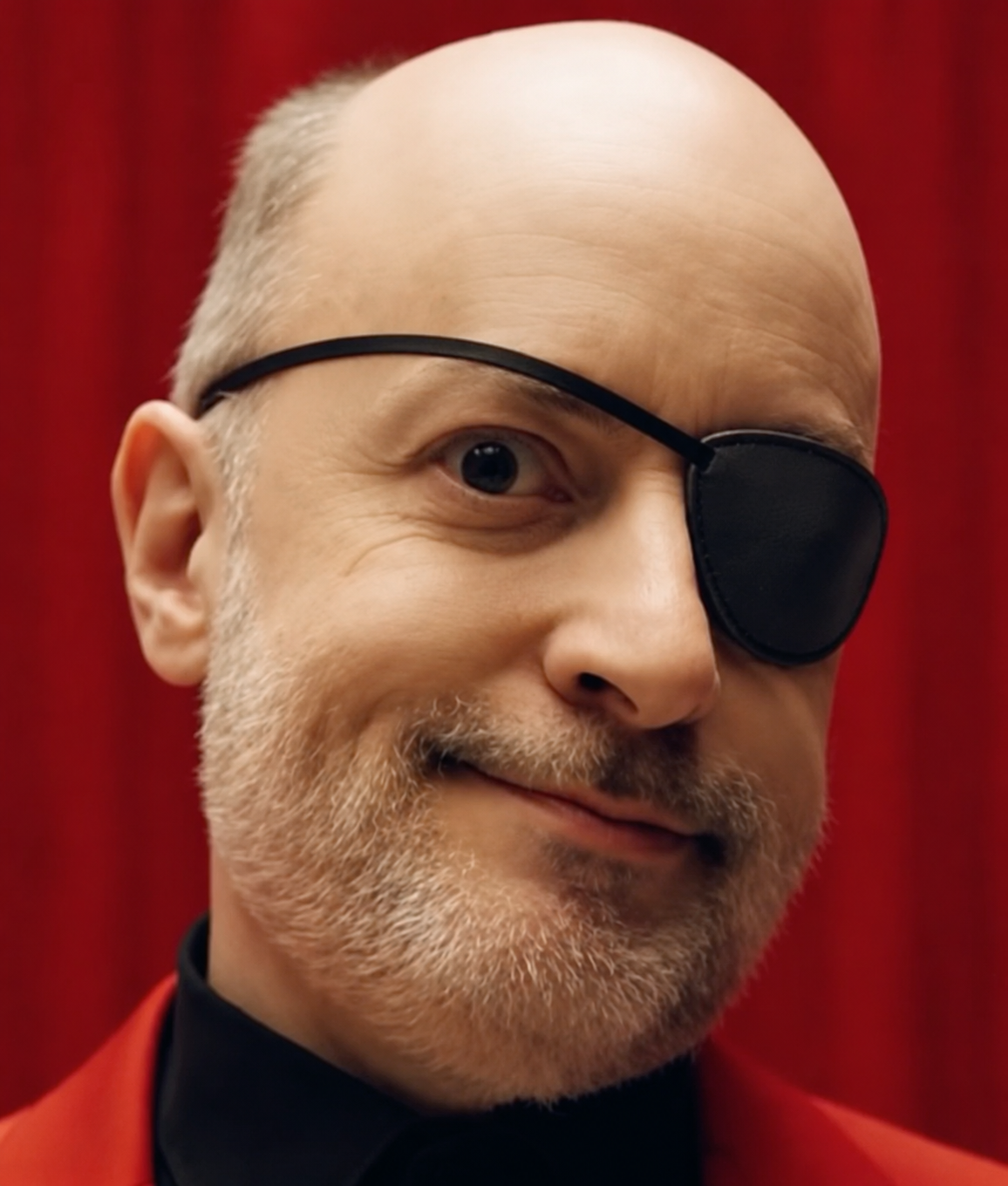
- Born: March 19, 1969 (age 57); Huntington, New York
- Writing career
- Pen name: Paul Casanova, Montague John Druitt, William Gull, Elliott Larkfield, John Pizer, J.K. Stephen, Seth Strummer, Nguyen van Foch, David Stabler
- Notable works: Personality Comics; Revolutionary Comics

Robert Schnakenberg (born March 19, 1969) is a self-styled “author and raconteur” from Brooklyn, New York. He is best known for writing a series of popular reference books about entertainment, sports, and world history. The celebrated playwright and wit Jack Canfora once dubbed him "the clown prince of American letters."

== Career ==
Schnakenberg—or "Schnak" as he prefers to style himself —is the author of more than 40 books, including The Encyclopedia Shatnerica (an A-to-Z reference about the life and career of William Shatner), Christopher Walken A-to-Z, and the New York Times bestseller The Big Bad Book of Bill Murray. His 2010 book, Old Man Drinks, was praised for evoking "the simple, timeless aspects of masculine drinking culture." His next book, Post-Stroke Curly: A Stooge in Decline, about the final years of comedian Curly Howard, will be published in 2027.

In 2014, Schnakenberg adopted the "kid-friendly alter ego" David Stabler. In 2026, he began wearing an eyepatch "purely as an affectation." Having done so, he declared that he had now "evolved into [his] final form."

== Published works ==
- The Encyclopedia Shatnerica (1998: 2nd Edition: 2008) (ISBN 1-58063-039-1)
- Distory: A Treasury of Historical Insults (2004) (ISBN 0-312-32671-8)
- I (Heart) My Truck (2005) (ISBN 1-56906-594-2)
- Sci-Fi Baby Names (2007) (ISBN 1-59474-161-1)
- Secret Lives of Great Authors (2008) (ISBN 1-59474-211-1)
- Christopher Walken A-to-Z (2008) (ISBN 1-59474-259-6)
- Secret Lives of the Supreme Court (2009) (ISBN 1-59474-308-8)
- Secret Lives of Great Filmmakers (2009) (ISBN 1-59474-434-3)
- Old Man Drinks (2010) (ISBN 1-59474-450-5)
- The Underground Baseball Encyclopedia (2010) (ISBN 1-60078-331-7)
- DC Comics 75th Anniversary Poster Book (2010) (ISBN 1-59474-462-9)
- The Underground Football Encyclopedia (2011) (ISBN 1-60078-516-6)
- Crazy Sh*t Presidents Said (2012) (ISBN 0-76244-453-3)
- Kid Presidents: True Tales of Childhood from America's Presidents (2014) (ISBN 1-59474-731-8)
- Kid Athletes: True Tales of Childhood from Sports Legends (2015) (ISBN 1-59474-802-0)
- The Big Bad Book of Bill Murray (2015) (ISBN 1-59474-801-2)
- Kid Artists: True Tales of Childhood from Creative Legends (2016) (ISBN 1-59474-896-9)
- Kid Authors: True Tales of Childhood from Famous Writers (2017) (ISBN 1-59474-987-6)
- Kid Scientists: True Tales of Childhood from Science Superstars (2018) (ISBN 1-68369-074-5)
- Who Is Dale Earnhardt Jr.? (2022) (ISBN 0593225961)
- Who Is Jimmy Carter? (2022) (ISBN 0593387392)
- What Is the Story of Captain Picard? (2023) (ISBN 0593387392)
- Who Is Carol Burnett? (2025) (ISBN 9780593886571)
- Who Is Willie Nelson? (2025) (ISBN 9780593886540)
- What Is the Grand Ole Opry? (2026) (ISBN 9780593886540
