= Grimtooth's Traps Lite =

Supplement for Role Aids

Grimtooth's Traps Lite is a 1992 role-playing supplement published by Flying Buffalo.

== Contents ==
Grimtooth's Traps Lite is a supplement in which dungeon traps are presented which focus more on causing pain or humiliation rather than death.

== Publication history ==
Grimtooth's Traps Lite is the fifth release in the Grimtooth's Traps line.

== Reception ==
Christopher Earley reviewed Grimtooth's Traps Lite in White Wolf #35 (March/April, 1993), rating it a 2 out of 5 and stated that "While there is commendable variety, and an indication of a new direction for growth with Grimbuck's SF traps, this book has only a handful of ideas that show original thinking, and a lot of graphic and textual filler."
