= Lejentia Campaigns Book 1: Skully's Harbor =

Tabletop role-playing game supplement

Cover art, 1989

Lejentia Campaigns Book 1: Skully's Harbor is a 1989 fantasy role-playing game supplement published by Flying Buffalo and Task Force Games.

== Contents ==
Lejentia Campaigns Book 1: Skully's Harbor is a campaign setting supplement which is based on the world of Lejentia as outlined in a trio of graphic novels by Steven S. Crompton and H.J. Bennett. It included 150 pages at letter paper size. The adventures, not designed for any particular role-playing system, were meant to be adapted to whatever game system the gamemaster was using. The book includes:

- a general description of the world of Lejentia and a world map
- a description of the three main races, and the turbulent history leading up to present circumstances
- a description of the city of Skully's Harbor, with 16 specific places described, and a short scenario attached to each place

== Publication history ==
In 1989, Task Force Games and Flying Buffalo published Lejentia Campaigns Book 1: Skully's Harbor as the first in a proposed series of supplements that would describe various areas of the world of Lejentia. The first volume, a 148-page book, was written by H.J. Bennett, with art by Steven S. Crompton, Dirk Deppey, and Patrick Gidaro.

A second book, Lejentia Campaigns Book 2: Fort Bevits, was also published in 1989, but no further books in the series were published. Lejentia Stanza Adventure Pack 1, a book describing how creatures, characters and places from the three Lejentia graphical novels could be adapted for role-playing, was also published in 1989.

The Lejentia game books were based on a 3-issue, independent Elves of Lejentia comic book series that was published in 1987-1989. The comic was also by created and drawn by H.J. Bennett and Steven S. Crompton.

== Reception ==
Stewart Wieck reviewed the product in a 1990 issue of White Wolf. He took issue with the graphics layout and stated that he "wasn't very impressed with the product. It seemed to be a new way of providing statistics for innumerable NPCs", but added that "it actually provides an interesting setting for adventure". He rated it overall at 4 out of 5 possible points.
