= Djustine =

Italian comic book series

- Djustine: Tales from the Twisted West!

Publication information
- Publisher: EF edizioni Carnal Comics; Eros Comix
- Format: Ongoing series
- Genre: , dark erotica, weird west

Creative team
- Created by: Enrico Teodorani
- Written by: Enrico Teodorani
- Artist(s): Enrico Teodorani, Andrea Bulgarelli, Silvano Calligari, Antonio Conversano, Nik Guerra, Enrique Badía Romero

Djustine is an Italian comic book series by Enrico Teodorani.

Enrico Teodorani's Djustine character was created from a fusion of Franco Nero's Django role and the Marquis de Sade's titular female "Justine". The work has been called "between genres, without patterns or preconceptions".

== Publication history ==
In the late 1990s, the wild Italian comics adventures of Djustine, a blond female gunslinger, were published as photocopies; they were sold only in Italy or through the mail to fans of supernatural western comics. Since 2003, Djustine has been regularly published in Italy on books by EF edizioni and on X-Comics magazine by Coniglio Editore and in the United States in the series Djustine: Tales of the Twisted West by Carnal Comics.

== Synopsis ==
The normally adult-natured adventures of Djustine involve her facing supernatural creatures (such as werewolves, zombies and demonic beings). All the stories take place in a strange, gothic western world of the 1880s.

== Feature film ==
A non-erotic movie based on Enrico Teodorani's many versions of the Djustine comic was assembled several years ago, but was never realized.
