= City of the Gods: Forgotten =

Fantasy novel by M. Scott Verne and Wynn Mercere

City of the Gods: Forgotten is an illustrated fiction, epic fantasy novel by M. Scott Verne and Wynn Mercere. In 2017, it was revealed that M.Scott Verne is the pen name of the book's art director Steve Crompton. The trade paperback edition has over 80 illustrations, many by notable artists Gustave Doré, Lord Frederick Leighton, Léon François Commerre, Lawrence Alma-Tadema, Arthur Hughes, Jean-Léon Gérôme, Ingres, Diego Velázquez, William Bouguereau, Botticelli, John William Waterhouse, and others of the 16th to 18th centuries. The Kindle version has 20 full-page illustrations. Published by Raven Press in January 2011, the book is available as a 428-page trade paperback or as an Amazon Kindle book. On August 31, 2017, an audio book version of this novel was made available at Audible.com.

Cover: City of the Gods: Forgotten

== Plot summary ==
Trapped in a timeless city governed by all the old gods of Earth, D'Molay is a tracker who works for the Gods. He makes a fateful choice to assist a hapless girl early in the story. He then begins to suspect she has some kind of connection to a huge beast ravaging the Olympian realm. D'Molay is torn between his duty to the eternal world and the leading of his heart. His compulsion to protect her pits the wits of a man against the guile of the gods, rekindling a faith he had long ago forgotten. In theory, any of the gods of old could appear in the City of the Gods. Some of the deities that appear include the Greco/Roman Gods Zeus, Eros, Zephyrus, Ares, Hermes and Glaucus. Egyptian gods Set and Sekhmet and Babylonian gods include Lamasthu and Namtar. Various Chinese, Norse, Indian, Mayan and African gods are also featured as the story unfolds. The gods are portrayed very much as they appeared in classical mythology, but each exhibits their own personalities and motivations.

The book deals with issues of trust, faith and the loss of both. There are also strong hints as to why the gods left Earth. It also explores the different classes of inhabitants in realm of the Gods: slaves, merchants, freeman, priests and deities.

== Main characters ==
- D'Molay the Tracker - The human protagonist. He tries to protect an unusual girl who seems to have no past, while working for the Gods.
- Aavi - She wakes up one morning in the streets of the City of the Gods and tries to recover her missing memories throughout the novel.
- Mazu the Ferrywoman - She is in fact a Chinese goddess who aids Aavi and D'Molay.
- The gods Eros and Zephyrus - They are conscripted by Zeus to aid the gods after witnessing a disaster in the Olympian realm.
- The god Set - His quest for power inadvertently leads him to Aavi.
- The god Quetzalcoatl - A member of the Council. He works his own agenda throughout the novel.
- The goddess Lamasthu - Like Quetzalcoatl, she is on her own quest for power. She works closely with Set.

== Future books in the series ==
The official City of the Gods website lists three books planned in the novel series:

- City of the Gods: Forgotten (released January 2011)
- City of the Gods: Guardian (released May 2013)
- City of the Gods: Ambassador

Short story anthologies set in the novels' universe are slated for release between full books of the series. These include:

- Mythic Tales: City of the Gods Vol 1. (released February 2012)
- Mythic Tales: City of the Gods Vol 2. (released December 2014)

== Other City of the Gods Universe works ==
A promotional City of the Gods: Forgotten chapbook released in 2010 received a Silver award from the Arizona/New Mexico division of the Printing Industries of America for printing excellence. This preview of the novel was released for Amazon Kindle in October 2010.

In July 2011, Flying Buffalo Inc. released the City of the Gods Map Pack. This product in the Catalyst (role-playing game supplements) line contains a large full-color map of the City of the Gods, a map of the surrounding lands, a booklet that describes important buildings in the City, and 18 full-color character cards. Most of the characters and places described in the Map Pack are taken directly from the first novel and other locations and events from the City of the Gods Universe.

A digital comic book entitled The Last Goddess #1 was released in October 2011 and a limited edition print version of the title was released in March 2012. Also written by Verne and Mercere, it take place in the City of the Gods Universe . The story is not directly related to events in the novel, but does reference concepts of the fantasy world. The second comic in the digital line, "Pantheon #1 - Death of the Gods" was released in April 2012. Another digital comic, "Pantheon #2 - Aftermath of Valhalla" and the illustrated story "Pantheon #3 - The Final Chapter" were released in June 2012. This stand-alone series is a prequel to events in the novels and anthology and features major characters from the City of the Gods Universe.

Art of the Gods, a companion book by Steve Crompton, was released in July 2013 in both digital and print formats. This publication by the art director of all the City of the Gods Universe products features full-color reproduction of selected illustrations from the novels and discusses the technical aspects of producing the art. Text includes an introduction by Wynn Mercere and commentary by M.Scott Verne.

A City of the Gods: Ambassador chapbook was published in 2017. This preview of the third novel was also released at drivethrucomics.com in May 2017.
