= Maps: Cities =

- Publisher: Flying Buffalo
- Publication date: 1993

Maps: Cities is a 1993 role-playing supplement published by Flying Buffalo.

== Contents ==
Maps: Cities is a supplement in which layouts and brief descriptions are provided for 21 locations.

== Reception ==
Christopher Earley reviewed Maps: Cities in White Wolf #40 (1994), rating it a 3 out of 5 and stated that "Maps fills its intended role. There isn't a great deal of flavor or any wish-you-were-there maps, but the book is serviceable."

== Reviews ==
- Dragon #205
- Shadis #10
