= Oui (magazine) =

Adult pornographic magazine

- OUI magazine first cover (October 1972) featuring Nadia Cassini
- Categories: Pornographic magazine
- Frequency: 12 / year
- Founded: 1972
- Final issue: 2007
- Country: United States
- Language: English

Oui ("Yes") was a pornographic magazine for men published in the United States from 1972 to 2007. It featured explicit nude photographs of women, with full page pin-ups, centerfolds, interviews and other articles, and cartoons.

== Playboy years ==
Oui was originally published in France under the name Lui ("Him") as a French equivalent of Playboy magazine.. The first issue, published by Daniel Filipacchi, appeared in November 1963. In 1972, Playboy Enterprises purchased the rights for a U.S. edition, changing the name to Oui, and the first issue was published in October of that year. Jon Carroll, formerly assistant editor at Rolling Stone magazine and editor of Rags and later editor of The Village Voice, was selected as the first editor. Arthur Kretchmer, the editor of Playboy, however, had a role in ensuring that editorial choices would be in line with Hugh Hefner's vision.

The intention was to differentiate the audience in mass-market men's magazines, in an attempt to answer the challenge brought by Penthouse and Hustler, with its more explicit photography, and therefore compete on multiple fronts. At first Playboy considered a direct response by following Penthouse in a nudity escalation, but Playboy management was hesitant to alter the magazine's philosophy, based on a more 'mature' and 'sophisticated' audience (one-third of Playboy's readership at that time was estimated to be over 35). Instead, a separate publication, Oui, was introduced in order to pursue a younger readership, offering a combination of a "rambunctious editorial slant with uninhibited nudes pictured in the Penthouse mood."

== Article content ==
In the late seventies, Oui published some interesting articles, including "Is this the man who ate Michael Rockefeller?" (April 1977) by Lorne Blair (lately famous for the Ring of Fire documentaries), beginning with a photograph of a grinning New Guinea native, told by the intrepid anthropologist/reporter who journeyed to New Guinea, interviewed people who had known Michael Rockefeller, then ventured into the jungle and talked to members of the tribe from whom Rockefeller had bought native art artifacts, including totem poles. In the end, he found a man who claimed he had eaten the unfortunate collector.

Oui also hosted several reportages about Central Intelligence Agency (CIA) activity, like the article "CIA vs. USA – The Agency's Plot to Take Over America" by Philip Agee, about an alleged Operation PBPrime, whose leaders were the top four men in the CIA and whose target was the control of the U.S. government.

In a more humorous vein, Oui also published the essay "The 3 Most Important Things in Life" by Harlan Ellison in its November 1978 issue. The three things in question were sex, violence, and labor relations, each illustrated by anecdotes from Ellison's life. The sex anecdote involved a less-than-successful assignation with a young woman, the violence anecdote was about witnessing a murder in a movie theater during a screening of Save the Tiger, and the labor relations anecdote was Ellison's version of the story of his being fired after only one morning at The Walt Disney Company for jokingly suggesting the making of a pornographic cartoon using the primary Disney characters. The piece has since been republished in Ellison's Stalking the Nightmare and Edgeworks 1. Oui also published short fiction.

A 1977 interview by Peter Manso of the then 29-year-old emerging actor Arnold Schwarzenegger on issues like sex, drugs, bodybuilding, and homosexuality produced some embarrassment 25 years later to candidate Schwarzenegger in the 2003 California gubernatorial campaign.

During the 1970s, Oui printed a copy of Shere Hite's questionnaire about female sexuality that was used as the basis of The Hite Report. Replies were received from 253 of the magazine's women readers.

== Post-Playboy years ==
Despite its popularity, Oui was unable to produce a profit. Furthermore, management realized that Oui was taking more readers from Playboy than from Penthouse. So, in June 1981 Playboy Enterprises, based in Chicago, ended its Oui experiment. The magazine was sold to Laurant Publishing Ltd. in New York; its new president and chief operating officer was Irwin E. Billman, former executive vice president and chief operating officer of the Penthouse Group.

During the 1980s the magazine maintained its distinction from Playboy by publishing graphic nude pictures like its rivals Penthouse and Hustler. Initially, Laurant featured celebrity nudity in Oui, peaking in 1982 with pictorials of Phyllis Hyman, Linda Blair, Demi Moore, and Pia Zadora. In the same year the magazine bought the short story "Down Among the Dead Men" by science-fiction writers Gardner Dozois and Jack Dann. The editorial plan was to return the magazine to the "younger Playboy image" that it previously had.

The 1990s found the magazine focusing on pop culture and youth-centered topics, with rock musician interviews and an increasingly large comics section that included R-rated versions of the X-rated Carnal Comics: True Stories of Adult Film Stars line, Rip Off Press's Demi the Demoness (later the first adults-only comic character to be adapted as a live action film), and a serialized version of Jay Allen Sanford's illustrated book Triple-X Cinema: A Cartoon History.

The magazine subsequently experienced a significant decline in circulation. As had many of its competitors, Oui expanded its photo content to hardcore in the early 2000s, which included depictions of couples having sexual intercourse, including explicit penetration. Oui ceased publication in 2007.

== See also ==
- List of men's magazines
- List of pornographic magazines
