= Unauthorized biography =

Biography written without the subject's permission or input

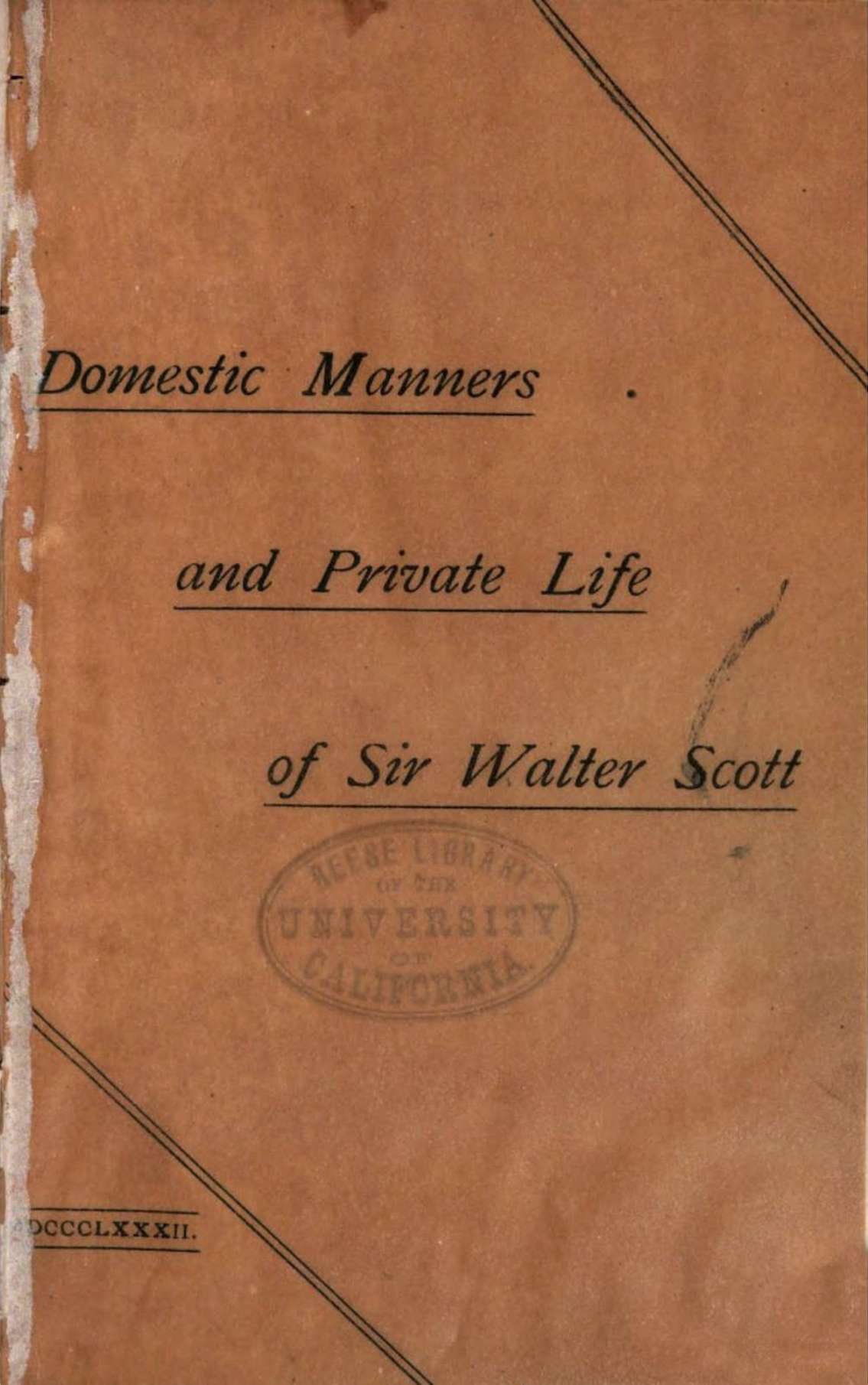
1882 edition of Domestic Manners and Private Life of Sir Walter Scott (1834) by James Hogg, an unauthorized biography

An unauthorized biography, sometimes called a kiss-and-tell, or a tell-all, is a biography written without the subject's permission or input. The term is usually restricted to biographies written within the subject's lifetime or shortly after their death; as such, it is not applied to biographies of historical figures written long after their deaths.

== Objectivity ==
Unauthorized biographies may be considered more objective but less detailed than other biographies, because they are not contingent on the subject's approval (and therefore may contain accurate information that the subject would not have authorized), but are also not privy to information or corrections known only to the subject or the subject's close friends and family.

== Legality ==
The subjects of unauthorized biographies are almost always public figures. Rarely do public figures succeed in preventing the release of unauthorized biographies. Unauthorized biographies of people who are not deemed public figures may be considered violations of the right to privacy and subject to legal action. As Ted Schwarz (1992) writes:

Interesting people totally unknown to the general public are usually considered private individuals, even when married to someone famous. Writing about them without their permission may be considered invasion of privacy, a situation that seldom arises with politicians, entertainers, and others who are obvious public figures.

Speaking of U.S. courts, Lloyd Rich (2002) writes:

Courts maintain a strong duty to protect First Amendment speech as they have an overriding concern and fear that placing "prior restraints" on speech could lead to a "chilling effect" on other speech. Because of this deference to the First Amendment and the presumption against prior restraints, a court will usually not permit an injunction that prevents the publication and/or distribution of an unauthorized biography but instead will only permit monetary damages to be awarded to remedy the unlawful acts of the author and publisher.

The legality of unauthorized biographies varies by country. Brazil enacted a short-lived law in 2014 requiring permission from biographies' subjects before publication.

== Reception ==
Unauthorized biographies are not necessarily unwelcomed by their subjects, and in fact some unauthorized biographies have been criticized for displaying overeager admiration for them; however, unauthorized biographies have a wider reputation for fueling controversy and painting unflattering portraits of their subjects.

While unauthorized biographies often receive significant news coverage, their writers tend to face "media disdain" due to the perception that their work is gossipy, voyeuristic, and busybodyish.

For a period in the early 1990s, a number of independent publishers — including Revolutionary Comics and Personality Comics — found great success and sales of unauthorized comic book biographies. One publisher claimed that not all its biographies were unauthorized, stating that "DeForest Kelley... and Kim Basinger had sent autographed copies of their biographies, and... Walter Koenig... had edited his." However, a number of these companies later faced legal challenges to their publications, which resulted in the unauthorized comic book biography fad dying down.

== See also ==
- Shock value
- Doomscrolling
- Non-fiction
