= Grimtooth's Traps Too =

Role playing game 1982

Grimtooth's Traps Too is a 1982 role-playing game supplement published by Flying Buffalo's Blade division.

== Contents ==
Grimtooth's Traps Too is a compilation that presents 101 more traps intended to be used in any role-playing game system.

== Reception ==
William A. Barton reviewed Grimtooth's Traps Too in The Space Gamer No. 61. Barton commented that "Though a few might think the idea is stretching thin after two volumes, most GMs should find Traps Too useful for ideas to plague their players - who may want to buy it in self-defense and memorize its contents to know what to look out for. Either way, it's sure to enliven (endeaden?) RPG play."
