= San Diego Reader =

Newspaper in San Diego, California, US

- Type: Alternative weekly
- Format: Tabloid
- Owner: Matt Lickona
- Founder: Jim Holman
- Editor: Matt Lickona
- Founded: October, 1972
- Headquarters: San Diego, California, U.S.
- Circulation: 90,000 weekly (as of 2015)
- OCLC number: 475745849
- Website: SanDiegoReader.com

The San Diego Reader is an alternative press newspaper in San Diego County, California. Published weekly since October 1972, the Reader was distributed free on Wednesday and Thursday via street boxes and cooperating retail outlets.

== History ==
Founder Jim Holman, a navy veteran, worked for the Chicago Reader before starting up in San Diego. The initial press run of the San Diego Reader was 20,000 copies that cost $400 to print. In 1989, it was printing 131,000 copies a week and in 2015, the circulation was 90,000. In 1974 the office occupied O’Sullivan Square, a handsome brick building on Kettner Blvd. In the late 70s they moved to a converted industrial building at 635 State Street. In 1988, the Reader moved into a former restaurant in Little Italy and moved to offices in Golden Hill in 2012.

In a 1989 story about the paper, the Los Angeles Times wrote that it had developed a reputation as being "liberal", and contrasted that to Holman's morality-driven rules for the paper, such as refusing to publish advertisements promoting abortion services and prohibiting personal advertisements seeking homosexual relationships (later modified to prohibit all personal ads). He also runs the pro-life California Catholic Daily website from the same offices.

Due to the impact of the COVID-19 pandemic in 2020, 30 employees agreed to take pay cuts equivalent to half of their pay.

In February 2024, Jim Holman announced that the Reader has a new owner/editor Matt Lickona, who bought the paper for one dollar, and that print publication would be shutting down. The online version of the paper will continue.
