= Steve Crompton =

Canadian artist

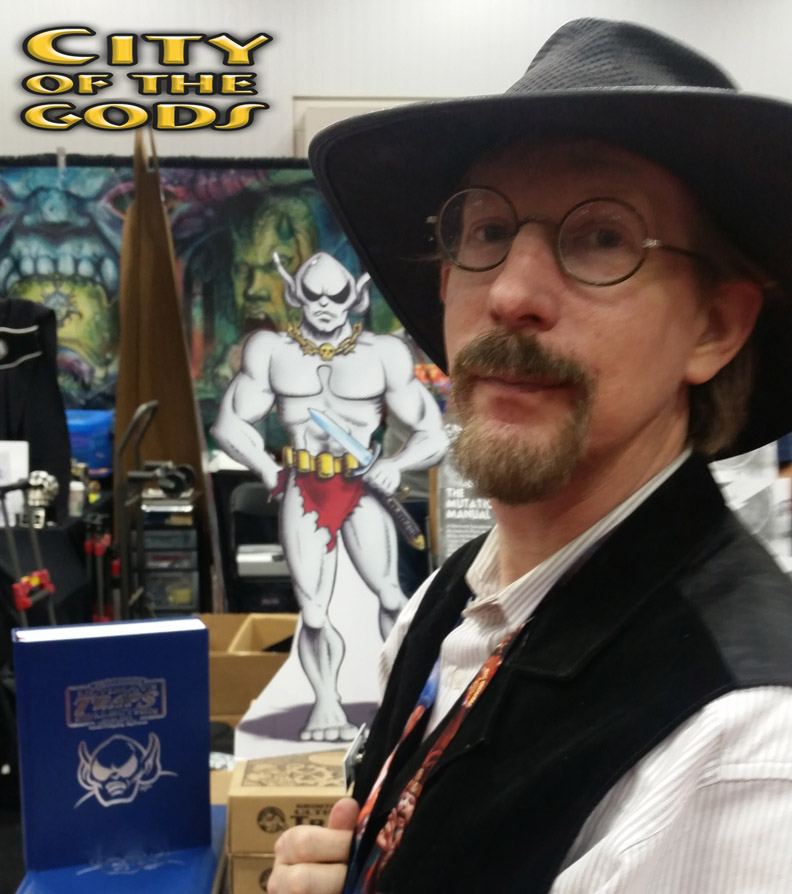
- Steve Crompton at Gencon 2017
- Born: Steve Crompton; 1962 (age 63–64) Canada
- Areas: Cartoonist, Writer, Penciller, Inker, Editor, Colourist
- Notable works: Demi the Demoness, Grimtooth's Traps, Nuclear War, Tunnels & Trolls, City of the Gods: Forgotten

Steven S. Crompton is a Canadian-born artist, author and designer who has worked in the role-playing and comic genres since 1981. In the gaming industry he is best known as the artist for the Grimtooth's Traps books as well as other Catalyst role-playing game supplements, Tunnels & Trolls and the Nuclear War card game.

== Education ==
Steven Crompton went to Arizona State University art college for two years, the Scottsdale Community College, and the Vo-Tech Commercial Art School.

== Career ==
Starting in 1981, Steve Crompton worked as staff illustrator for Flying Buffalo Inc., and did the art and designed some of the traps in Grimtooth's Traps. He also did maps and Illustrations for numerous other RPG books and games published by the company from 1981 to 1985. During that period, he did freelance work for Steve Jackson Games, Game Designers Workshop, Fantasy Games Unlimited, and others.

His first widely distributed comic was Elves of Lejentia #1 - 3, in 1987. In 1991, he was hired by Todd Loren to work on Psychoman and his own creation, Demi the Demoness. The Demi comics have been in continuous publication since 1992. Demi was adapted into a live-action movie and released on DVD in 2008; new Demi comics continue to be published.

He developed the art and marketing for the City of the Gods: Forgotten novel and related books, games and comics.

Since 2005 he has managed entire projects, contributing to all aspects of a publishing endeavor including marketing, working directly with other creators, design, writing, art, maps, pre-press, printing liaison and final delivery to the end users. Recent examples include Deluxe Tunnels & Trolls RPG, 50th Anniversary Nuclear War, Ace of Aces limited edition reprint, the Grimtooth's Ultimate Traps Collection an updated edition of the Mercenaries, Spies & Private Eyes RPG, and a 2nd edition of the Monsters! Monsters! RPG.

In August 2019, after the death of Flying Buffalo publisher Rick Loomis, Crompton was named the managing director of Flying Buffalo. He oversaw the continuation of Flying Buffalo's intellectual properties and ongoing publishing ventures. In August 2021, Flying Buffalo's assets were sold, and a new company (WebbedSphere) took over the ownership of Flying Buffalo. Steve Crompton is currently the art director for Trollhalla Press Unlimited and is co-creating and working on RPG projects with Ken St. Andre.

== Art for games ==
Besides Grimtooth's Traps and Nuclear War, other notable games include Tunnels & Trolls, Mercenaries, Spies & Private Eyes, Traveller, DCC RPG, Immortal, GURPS, Space Opera, Space: 1889, Lejentia Campaigns, Grid Iron, Lost Worlds, the Powerz Card Game, and many others.

Several of the games he has worked on have won the HG Wells Origins Award, including Citybook, Stormhaven, Nuclear Escalation and Nuclear Proliferation. Nuclear War won the Hall of Fame Award as one of the best card games of all time.

=== Selected game bibliography ===
Along with art, he also contributed to the design and writing of some of these products.

- Grimtooth's Traps - 1981 (Flying Buffalo)
- Catacombs of the Bear Cult - 1981 (Flying Buffalo)
- Grimtooth's Traps Too - 1982 (Flying Buffalo)
- Citybook I: Butcher, Baker, Candlestick Maker - 1982 (Flying Buffalo)
- Nuclear Escalation - 1983 (Flying Buffalo)
- The Traveller Adventure - 1983 (Game Designers' Workshop)
- Alderson Yards Shipbook - 1985 Fantasy Games Unlimited
- Grimtooth's Traps Fore - 1986 (Flying Buffalo)
- Lejentia Campaigns Book 1: Skully's Harbor - 1988 (Flying Buffalo)
- Lejentia Campaigns Book 2 - 1989 (Flying Buffalo)
- Grimtooth's Traps Ate - 1989 (Flying Buffalo)
- Grimtooth's Traps Lite - 1991 (Flying Buffalo)
- Case of the Pacific Clipper - Mugshots 1 - 1991 (Flying Buffalo)
- Lost World: Flaming Cherry - 1992 (Flying Buffalo)
- Lost World: Gargoyle w/ Spear - 1992 (Flying Buffalo)
- Nuclear War Booster Cards - 1993 (Flying Buffalo)
- Grimtooth's Dungeon of Doom - 1993 (Flying Buffalo)
- Maps 1 - Cities - 1993 (Flying Buffalo)
- Maps 2 - Places of Legend - 1994 (Flying Buffalo)
- Grimtooth's Traps Bazaar - 1995 (Flying Buffalo)
- Citybook VII - King's River Bridge - 1997 (Flying Buffalo)
- Nuclear Proliferation 2nd ed - 1990, 2003 (Flying Buffalo)
- Nuclear War 2nd ed - 2001 (Flying Buffalo)
- Wurst of Grimtooth’s Traps - 2005 (Necromancer Games)
- Weapons of Mass Destruction - 2005 (Flying Buffalo)
- Origins Poker Decks — 2007-2011 (Flying Buffalo/Game Manufacturers Association) (GAMA)
- City of the Gods Map Pack - 2013 (Flying Buffalo)
- Adventurers Compendium - 2014 (Flying Buffalo)
- Deluxe Tunnels & Trolls - 2015 (Flying Buffalo)
- Grimtooth's Ultimate TRAPS Collection - 2015 (Goodman Games)
- Agent of Death - 2016 (Flying Buffalo)
- T&T Adventures Japan - 2017 (Flying Buffalo)
- Vaults of K'Horror - 2018 (Flying Buffalo)
- Grimtooth's Trapsylvania - 2019 (Goodman Games)
- Mercenaries, Spies & Private Eyes - 2019 (Flying Buffalo)
- Alice in Weirdworld T&T solo - 2020 (Flying Buffalo)
- Monsters! Monsters! 2nd Ed. RPG - 2020 (Trollhalla Press Ultd.)
- Monsterary of Zimrala - 2022 (Trollhalla Press Ultd.)
- Monsters! Monsters! 2.7 - 2023 (Trollhalla Press Ultd.)
- Humans! Humans! RPG Supplement - 2024 (Trollhalla Press Ultd.)

== Art for comics ==
Crompton is best known for his creation Demi the Demoness and his work as editor and designer of the Carnal Comics line since 2001, with over 35 books including Frank Brunner's Carnal Delights and Carnal Comics: the Inside Story. He has worked for Rip Off Press, Hippy Comix, Kitchen Sink Press, Cry for Dawn Productions, Revolutionary Comics and many others. He also created 100 comic-style art cards for the Topps Mars Attacks Invasion trading card series.

=== Selected comics bibliography ===
==== Demi the Demoness ====
- Demi the Demoness #1–7. 1992–2003, Revolutionary Comics
- Demi Adventure Special #1. 1995, Rip Off Press
- Tracey Adams/Demi #1. 1995, Revisionary Press
- Demi the Demoness color strip. 1996/98, Oui magazine
- Demi meets Cassiopeia #1. 1997, Rip Off Press
- Demi & Capt. Fortune #1. 1997 Rip Off Press
- Demi & Shaundra #1. 1998, Rip Off Press
- Demi Art Card Set. 1998, Opus Graphics
- Demi's Wild Kingdom #1. 2000, Carnal/MU Press
- Demi's Strange Bedfellows #1–5. 2001–2015, Carnal Comics
- Demi Demoness Graphic Novel. 2006, Carnal Comics
- Demi & Vampirooni #1. 2006, Carnal Comics
- Demi the Demoness Movie. 2008, Carnal Comics/MSD Productions
- Crimson Gash Meets Demi #1. 2009, Carnal Comics
- Demi & the Sex Squad #1. 2010, Carnal Comics
- Demi vs the Monsters of the Third Reich. 2014, Carnal Comics
- Demi Rarities. 2018, Carnal Comics
- CthulhuCrisis! #1. 2019, Raven Press
- CthulhuCrisis! Rise of the Yellow Wizard GN. 2024, Zimrala Press
- CthulhuCrisis! #2. 2024, Zimrala Press

==== Other titles ====
- Lejentia Stanza #1 - 3. 1987, Opus Graphics
- Psychoman #1. 1992, Revolutionary Comics
- Contemporary Bios: Ross Perot. 1992, Revolutionary Comics
- Rock & Roll #59: Eric Clapton. 1993, Revolutionary Comics
- Heavy Metal Monsters 3D. 1993
- Ray 3D Zone; Cherry’s Jubilee #4. 1994, Kitchen Sink Press
- NOIR #1 & 2, 1995, CryForDawn
- Pantheon #1 - 2. 1996, Archer Books and Games
- Letha Weapons #1. 1997 Revisionary Press
- Wild Kingdom #12. 2001 (artist, letterer), MU Press
- Felecia Adult Star Stories #1. 2002, Hippy Comix
- Sex Squad #1 & 2. 2003, Carnal Comics
- Jenna Jameson Collection. 2004, Carnal Comics
- Carnal Comics: Inside Story. 2004, Carnal Comics
- Djustine - Twisted West #1. 2004, Carnal Comics
- Sex Squad #2. 2004, Carnal Comics
- Wild! #13/Minkenstein #1. 2005, MU Press
- Aurora Snow Bio Comic # 1. 2009, Carnal Comics
- Girl Meets Tentacle #1. 2010, Carnal Comics
- Underground Comix Price Guide Supplement. 2010, Hippy Comix
- City of the Gods: Forgotten. 2011, Raven Press
- The Last Goddess. 2011, Raven Press
- Mythic Tales: City of the Gods. 2011, Raven Press
- One Day in Hell #1. 2012, 3nd N Press
- Pantheon of the Gods. 2012, Raven Press
- Lost Comics of SS Crompton. 2013, Opus Graphics
- This Conquered Earth. 2013, Opus Graphics
- Fogel's Underground Comix Price Guide. 2015, Hippy Comix
- Twisted Tales of the West #1. 2020, Carnal Comics
- Vampirooni Crisis #1. 2024, Zimrala Press

== Pen name ==
Crompton has written a series of novels and short stories under the pen name M. Scott Verne. Currently these works are all related to the City of the Gods: Forgotten novels and other related books/games.
