= Grimtooth's Traps =

Grimtooth's Traps is a 1981 role-playing game supplement edited by Paul Ryan O'Connor, illustrated by Steve Crompton and published by Flying Buffalo.

== Contents ==
Grimtooth's Traps is a collection of traps selected from contributors.

== Reception ==
Aaron Allston reviewed Grimtooth's Traps in The Space Gamer No. 43. Allston commented that "I'd recommend this as one of the best supplements released this year - but use it sparingly, unless you have several Indiana Joneses in the party."

Anders Swenson reviewed Grimtooth's Traps for Different Worlds magazine and stated that "I liked the traps in this book, and I think that most GMs would do well to consider purchasing it if they feel the need for a source of trap ideas or simply to read an amusing book related to the FRP hobby."

Nicholas Dougan reviewed Grimtooth's Traps for White Dwarf #33, giving it an overall rating of 7 out of 10, and stated that "Although perhaps a little expensive, Grimtooth's Traps is none-the-less a demon-send for the referee who is always looking for that extra special trap for the next level. Be cautious, though: there is therein the potential for campaign destroying overkill."

Dungeon Master's Guide for 5th edition Dungeons & Dragons (2014) has listed Grimtooth's Traps in "Appendix D: Dungeon Master Inspiration".

== Reviews ==
- Jeux et Stratégie #28 (as "101 pièges pour tous les jeux de rôles")
