= Greg Fox (cartoonist) =

American cartoonist (born 1961)

- Fox in 2014
- Born: 1961 (age 64–65) Huntington, New York
- Area: Cartoonist
- Notable works: Kyle's Bed & Breakfast

Greg Fox (born 1961) is an American cartoonist, known for his long-running strip Kyle's Bed & Breakfast.

== Career ==
Fox began making comics at 12 years old, publishing his first strip at age 14 and continuing to illustrate and create editorial cartoons in college. He received a B.A. from the State University of New York at Geneseo. His work has appeared in national publications for companies such as Revolutionary Comics, Triumphant Comics, and Marvel Comics.

Fox began producing Kyle's Bed & Breakfast in 1998. The strip runs in a variety of publications across North America, as well as on the web. He published the first book collection of Kyle's B&B in September 2004; it was a nominee in the Humour category at the 2005 Lambda Literary Awards. Two additional collections have been published since: A Second Bowl of Serial and Hot Off the Griddle.

== Personal life ==
Fox currently resides in Northport, Long Island, New York. He is openly gay.

== Works ==
- Fox, Greg. Kyle's bed & breakfast / Greg Fox. New York, NY : Kensington Books, 2004. 140 p.; chiefly ill.; 28 cm. ISBN 0-7582-0693-3 (pbk.)
