= Citybook II: Port o' Call =

1984 role-playing game supplement

Citybook II: Port o' Call is a role-playing game supplement published by Flying Buffalo in 1984.

== Contents ==
Citybook II: Port o' Call is a campaign setting supplement presenting details of 22 businesses intended to be used with port cities. The second edition also includes "The Emerald Dome" by Paul O'Connor.

== Publication history ==
Citybook II: Port o' Call was edited by Liz Danforth, Michael Stackpole, and Jennifer Roberson, with a cover by Carl Lundgren and illustrations by Liz Danforth, Steve Crompton, and Dave Helber, and was published by Blade/Flying Buffalo in 1984 as a 112-page book, with a second printing of the first edition in 1986 from Blade/Task Force Games as a new publisher, and a second edition published by Flying Buffalo Inc in 1990 as a 120-page book with no price on the cover. Contributors include Allen Wold, Dave Arneson, Jim "Bear" Peters, Greg Gorden, Charles de Lint, Hank Stine, Glenn Rahman, Rudy Kraft, and Rick Loomis.

Flying Buffalo had begun an ambitious publishing schedule after arranging a line of credit with a local printer in 1982, which included Citybook II: Port O' Call. However, after an ownership change, the printer cut this line of credit in 1983; as such, it would be a year before Flying Buffalo could produce Citybook II (1984).

== Reception ==
Scott D. Haring reviewed Citybook II for Fantasy Gamer magazine and stated that "Blade has got a winner with its 'Catalyst Series,' and Citybook II is an excellent addition to the line. If you're a gamemaster who's never let his players get near the open sea because you didn't know how to handle the action, here's a simple introduction that's both easy to run and lots of fun."

== Reviews ==
- Games International #11
- SpielZeit #16
