= Revolutionary Comics =

Defunct American comic book publisher

- Parent company: Infinite One, Inc.
- Founded: 1989 (37 years ago)
- Founder: Todd Loren
- Defunct: 1994 (32 years ago)
- Country of origin: United States
- Headquarters location: San Diego, California
- Key people: Todd Loren, Herb Shapiro, Jay Allen Sanford
- Publication types: Comic books
- Nonfiction topics: Music, biography, erotica
- Imprints: Carnal Comics

Revolutionary Comics was an American comic book publisher specializing in unauthorized profiles of entertainers and professional athletes, as well as a line of erotic comics. Its flagship series was Rock 'N' Roll Comics. Founded by Todd Loren, Revolutionary Comics was based in San Diego.

== History ==
=== Origins ===
After some success with Musicade, a mail order music memorabilia company, Loren formed Revolutionary Comics in 1989. The publisher's first title was Rock 'N' Roll Comics, a line of unauthorized comic book biographies of rock stars prompted in part by the success of a 1986 Bruce Springsteen parody comic called Hey Boss.

=== Rock 'N' Roll Comics ===
Early issues of Rock 'N' Roll Comics contained straight biographies in comic form and Mad magazine-style parodies. The parodies were later dropped. The line featured unlicensed biographies of rock stars, told in comic book form but geared for adults, often with very adult situations (nudity, drug use, violence, etc.). The comic sported a cover tagline reading "Unauthorized and Proud of it." Some musicians featured in the comic were supportive, while others threatened legal action. The resulting media exposure garnered Rock 'N' Roll Comics huge sales of their early issues.

A later injunction led the company to expand its distribution network outside traditional comic shops, getting their products into music and gift retail outlets which had never carried comics before. This independence from the comic book direct market served the company well, as sales continued to rise from issue to issue.

Revolutionary's only other title at first was the bimonthly Tipper Gore's Comics and Stories, an EC-inspired horror anthology which lasted five issues. Other one-shots and short-lived titles followed; however, the heart of the company was Rock 'N' Roll Comics, which continued to sell large quantities.

=== Expansion ===
By the early 1990s, Revolutionary Comics was among the top three selling independent comic companies in the U.S. Loren brought on his father, Herb Shapiro, to be vice president of the growing company, while Jay Allen Sanford, who'd worked for Loren's Musicade and was writing for Rock ‘N’ Roll Comics, became the line's head writer. New music titles were launched, most notably Rock 'N' Roll Comics Magazine and Hard Rock Comics, as well as a line of "Experience" limited series, on such subjects as the Beatles, Elvis Presley, Led Zeppelin, and Pink Floyd (the latter of which the band liked well enough to include in their official Shine On CD box set).

In 1991, Revolutionary started a line of unauthorized sports biographical comics, which eventually included such titles as Baseball Superstars Comics, Baseball Legends Comics, Sports Superstars Comics, and Sports Legends Comics.

=== Carnal Comics ===
In 1991 Loren launched Carnal Comics, an adults-only imprint, to publish Lyndal Ferguson's erotic anthology series Sexpot, SS Crompton's Demi the Demoness, and Allen Salyer's Pineapple Perfume. Printer troubles led to some delays, but the first three Carnal Comics titles were released all at once in 1992. All only lasted a single issue.

=== Loren murder and company reorganization ===
Company founder Todd Loren was murdered in June 1992. Despite this tragedy, the company continued for two more years under Loren's father Herb Shapiro, with Sanford serving as managing editor.

During those years, the band Kiss participated in a three-issue biographical series called Kiss Pre-History, and other new music titles were launched, such as British Invasion and Alternative Comics (not to be confused with the Florida-based publishing company of the same name founded around the same time). The erotic imprint's next title, the limited series Carnal Comics: Sarah Jane Hamilton was also successful, selling in numbers almost as high as Rock ‘N’ Roll Comics (which, while in decline, along with all U.S. comics publishers at the time, were still selling 15,000 to 20,000 copies per issue). The Hamilton limited series was the last title published by Revolutionary.

=== Dissolution and legacy ===
Herb Shapiro decided to close the company in summer 1994, in part because of debt accrued by a failed color sports comic line. In the end, Revolutionary published more than 300 individual issues.

Under the banner Re-Visionary Press, Sanford continued to publish the Carnal Comics imprint; he later oversaw reprints of Revolutionary titles in digital editions and graphic novels licensed in the U.S. and overseas, including a 2014 Rock ‘N’ Roll Comics series licensed to Croatian publishers.

Sanford and Herb Shapiro kept the Revolutionary archive intact, including over 9,000 pages of original interior artwork, around 250 original cover paintings and illustrations, and all of the scripts, production materials, and printer film used to produce the comics. The copyrights and trademarks to all of the titles Revolutionary produced are also maintained, allowing for digital distribution via iTunes, Amazon.com, and other online outlets, where the comics continue to be popular with fans of both the subjects and offbeat comic books.

=== Bluewater Productions collections ===
In September 2009, publisher Bluewater Productions announced it would be reprinting Revolutionary's line of music comics (including stories from Rock 'N' Roll Comics) in ten monthly volumes, averaging 250 pages each. The first collections were The Beatles Experience and Hard Rock Heroes, released in early 2010.

Many of Revolutionary's original creators participated in updating and modernizing the contents of the musical comic bios. The reprints and updates were supervised by long-time Rock 'N' Roll Comics writer/editor Jay Allen Sanford. Ultimately, Bluewater released seven titles from 2010–2012:

- The Beatles Experience (Feb. 2010), 240 pp. ISBN 978-1427642271
- Hard Rock Heroes (Apr. 2010), 240 pp. ISBN 978-1616239244 — with AC/DC, Metallica, Guns N' Roses, Ozzy Osbourne/Black Sabbath, Van Halen, Megadeth, Spirit, Queensrÿche, Motörhead, ZZ Top
- The Runaways: Joan Jett – Lita Ford (Aug. 2010), 32 pp.
- The Pink Floyd Experience (Sept. 2010), 150 pp. ISBN 978-1616239305
- The Led Zeppelin Experience (Nov. 2010), 150 pp. ISBN 978-1616239398
- The Elvis Presley Experience (Mar. 2011), 210 pp. ISBN 978-1450700214
- Stan Lee: the Biography! (Feb. 2012), 32 pp. ISBN 978-0985591120

Two other projected volumes, Rock 'N' Roll Cartoon History: The Sixties; and Rock 'N' Roll Cartoon History: The Seventies, remain unpublished.

== Legal challenges ==
The unauthorized nature of Revolutionary's biographical titles, despite the company's commitment to journalistic reporting, led to legal issues from the beginning. Loren billed his company as an advocate for free speech, and made his case in court in a number of decisions.

Rock 'N' Roll Comics #1, cover-dated June 1989, resulted in a cease and desist order from the subject band, Guns N' Roses. No lawsuit was filed in that case, and resulting media coverage led to the comic going into multiple printings. Rock ‘N’ Roll Comics #3 and #4, on Bon Jovi and Mötley Crüe, respectively (cover-dated Sept. 1989 and Oct. 1989), did result in legal challenges over merchandising rights, which the company circumvented by distributing the comics through alternative routes. Rock 'N' Roll Comics #8, featuring Skid Row, was never published, due to a similar injunction related to merchandising rights.

Rock ‘N’ Roll Comics #12 (June 1990), an unauthorized biography of New Kids on the Block, led to a lawsuit. Loren claimed the First Amendment protected the journalistic rights of his "illustrated articles" and he took the matter to the U.S. District Court in California. In April 1990, U.S. District Judge John S. Rhoades declared that Rock ‘N’ Roll Comics #12 could be distributed because it is “part biography and part satire.” The judge's 12-page ruling stated that “bookstores are filled with biographies — both authorized and unauthorized — of public figures. And, while the subjects of such biographies may be offended by the publication of their life stories, they generally have no claim for trademark infringement.”

Rhoades’ ruling also stated, “It appears that the First Amendment may trump any claim that the plaintiffs have for trademark infringement.” The resultant order stated that Winterland Concessions Co. failed to show that the case met the standards required to issue a preliminary injunction. This dissolved the temporary restraining order prohibiting distribution. New Kids responded by filing suit for trademark infringement since its logo appeared in the comic. A settlement between New Kids and Revolutionary was reached in August 1990. It permanently enjoined Revolutionary from “advertising, manufacturing, distributing and/or selling or otherwise commercially exploiting any publication displaying the trademark and/or logo of the New Kids on the Block, either as a group or individually.” Loren promptly reprinted the New Kids story in magazine format (Rock 'N' Roll Comics Magazine), without depicting the band's logo.

The lawsuits garnered Revolutionary worldwide press, eventually resulting in high sales for an independent comics publisher.

Rock 'N' Roll Comics #61, about the band Yes, and scheduled for July 1993 release, was blocked from publication.

Revolutionary's sports titles also faced legal challenges. In 1993, the company lost a lawsuit filed by the NHL's Pittsburgh Penguins over the use of the team's logo in one of Revolutionary's sports comics. In 1994, the company settled a suit brought by football player Joe Montana based on one of its comics.

== Documentary film ==
In 2005, BulletProof Film released a documentary titled Unauthorized and Proud Of It: Todd Loren’s Rock ‘N’ Roll Comics. The documentary features interviews with Loren's family, surviving "Revolutionaries," comic book colleagues, adversaries, supporters, and past and present rock 'n' roll stars featured in Revolutionary's comics. Appearing in the film are Alice Cooper, publishers Gary Groth (Fantagraphics) and Denis Kitchen (Kitchen Sink Press), famed groupie Cynthia Plaster Caster, underground painter and cover artist Robert Williams (known for his controversial album art for the first Guns N' Roses LP), Jay Allen Sanford, Gene Simmons (audio only), and more. The documentary also details the San Diego police department's investigation into Loren's murder; interviews with Loren's coworkers and family members suggest that the police failed to follow up on all available leads.

The documentary was released on DVD in April 2012 by Wild Eye Releasing, under the title Unauthorized: The Story of Rock 'N' Roll Comics. The DVD includes over two hours of bonus footage, interviews, news footage, and art galleries, and liner notes by Sanford.

== Titles published (selected) ==
=== Music ===
- Rock 'N' Roll Comics (63 issues, Jul 1989–Nov 1993)
- Rock N' Roll Comics Magazine (7 issues, Jul 1990–Nov 1992)
- The Beatles Experience (8 issues, Mar 1991–May 1992)
- The Pink Floyd Experience (5 issues, Jul 1991–Feb 1992)
- Elvis Shrugged (3 issues, 1991; one-shot, 1993)
- Hard Rock Comics (20 issues, Mar 1992–Nov 1993)
- The Elvis Presley Experience (7 issues, Aug 1992–Apr 1994)
- The Led Zeppelin Experience (4 issues, Aug 1992–Feb 1993)
- Kiss Pre-History (3 issues, 1993)
- Queen's Greatest Hits (1993)
- Guns N' Roses Greatest Hits (1993)
- Metallica's Greatest Hits (1993)
- Rock 'N' Roll Comics Madonna Special (1993)
- Women in Rock (1993)
- Canadian Rock Special (1994)
- Frank Zappa: Viva la Bizarre (1994)

=== Entertainers and politicians ===
- Contemporary Bio-Graphics (8 issues, 1991–1992)
- Star Jam Comics (10 issues, Apr. 1992–Mar. 1993)

=== Sports ===
- Baseball Legends Comics (19 issues, Mar. 1992–Sept. 1993)
- Baseball Superstars Comics (20 issues, Nov. 1991–Aug. 1993)
- Sports Legends Comics (11 issues, 1992–May 1993)
- Sports Superstars Comics (16 issues, Apr. 1992–Aug. 1993)

=== Other titles ===
- Tipper Gore's Comics and Stories (5 issues, Oct. 1989–July 1990)
- Carnal Comics: Sarah-Jane Hamilton (May–July 1994)

== See also ==
- Personality Comics
