= Ken St. Andre bibliography =

Ken St. Andre was an American fantasy game designer and author, best known for creating the fantasy role-playing game, Tunnels & Trolls (T&T), and the computer role-playing game, Wasteland.

A bibliography and ludography of St. Andre's works follows. Detailed information on the role-playing game items can be found at RPG Geek.

== Role-playing games ==
- Fours (2019)
- Monsters! Monsters!
  - 1st edition, (1976; 2nd edition / printing, 1979)
  - 2nd edition (2020)
  - 2.7th edition (2023)
  - 1976 Zero Edition (2023), an early draft of 1st edition
- Starfaring
  - 1st edition (1976)
  - 2nd edition (2007)
- Stormbringer
  - 1st edition (1981)
  - 2nd edition (1985)
  - 3rd edition (1987)
  - 4th edition (1990)
- Thieves' World (1981), with multiple authors
- Tunnels & Trolls
  - 1st edition (1975)
  - 2nd edition (1975)
  - 3rd edition (1975)
  - 4th edition (1977)
  - 5th edition (1979)
  - 5.5th edition (2005)
  - 30th anniversary (7th) edition (2005)
  - 7.5th edition (2008)
  - Power Trip, a super-heroes T&T variant (2008)
  - Gamma Trollworld, a post-nuclear war T&T variant (2009), with James L. Shipman
  - 8th (French) edition (2012)
  - Deluxe edition (2015)

=== Adventure modules, solo adventures, and items ===
- Bean RPG
  - Death Phrogg Attack (2010)
- Monsters! Monsters!
  - Battle School: Deadly Combat (2020)
  - The Wizard's Test: Deadly Combat (M!M! version) (2020)
  - Vvvarrr's Qiip: Deadly Combat (M!M! version) (2020)
  - The Toughest Dungeon in the World (2020)
  - Rescue Mission: Deadly Combat (M!M! version) (2020)
  - Khara Khang's Random Rainbow Maze: Deadly Combat (M!M! version) (2020)
  - Oh My, Khost! (2021)
  - Monster Maze of Zorr: Deadly Combat (M!M! version) (2021)
  - Mission for a Cat Goddess (2022)
  - Monsters! Monsters! GM Screen (2022)
  - Ken St. Andre's Monsterary of Zimrala (2022)
  - Zimrala Big Map (2022)
  - Trollgod's Gift (2022)
  - Gauntlet of Doom (2022)
  - Trollgod's Crystal Caves Challenge (2023)
  - The Citadel of Serpents (2024), with A.R. Holmes
  - Grimhold (2024)
  - Humans! Humans! (2024)
- Shadowrun
  - Harlequin (1990) with multiple authors
- Stormbringer
  - Stormbringer Companion (1983)
- Tunnels & Trolls
  - Tunnels & Trolls Supplement (1976)
  - Computer Generated Dungeon (1977)
  - Solo 2: Deathtrap Equalizer Dungeon (1977)
  - Solo 4: Naked Doom (1977)
  - Solo 12: Arena of Khazan (1979)
  - Pocket Adventure 1: Goblin Lake (1979)
  - The Toughest Dungeon in the World (1980)
  - Agent of Death (1982)
  - Hela's House of Dark Delights, originally printed in Different Worlds Issue 22 (1982)
  - The Infinite Adventure (1985)
  - Sword for Hire and Blue Frog Tavern (1986)
  - The Amulet of the Salkti and Arena of Khazan (1986)
  - Naked Doom and Deathtrap Equalizer (1986)
  - Take the Money (2008)
  - Trollgod's Exciting Random Rooms of Ruination (2008)
  - Strange Destinies (2008)
  - Hunting Party (2008)
  - Hot Pursuit (2008)
  - Khara Khang's Random Rainbow Maze (2010)
  - The Wizard's Test (2011)
  - A Traveler's Tale (2011)
  - Tavern by the Sea (2011)
  - A Sworded Adventure (2011)
  - Rescue Mission (2011)
  - Dwarf World (2011)
  - DewDrop Inn (2011)
  - Deep Delving (2011)
  - Woodsman, Don't Spare That Tree (2011), a GM adventure included in Elder Tunnels' Halloween 2011 issue
  - Battle School (2012)
  - À la poursuite du serpent d'argent (2012)
  - Le Nain Ivre (2012)
  - Le lac aux gobelins (2012)
  - Le Dépouillement Dernier (2012)
  - Seven Challenges of Kartejan (2012)
  - 4 Jars of Mead (2013)
  - Trollhammer (2013)
  - Saving Fang from the Pits of Morgul (2013)
  - Solo 9: City of Terrors (Deluxe T&T 3rd Edition, 2013), with Michael Stackpole
  - Rock & Rule: The Spellbook of Gristlegrim's Dwarves (2014)
  - Missing Inaction (2014)
  - Adventurers Compendium (2014)
  - Les cavernes de Lan-Faer (2014)
  - Spellbook of the Leprechauns (2015)
  - Spellbook of the Gremlins (2015)
  - The Spell Book of Shancinar (Ancient Elven Magic) (2015)
  - Deluxe Tunnels & Trolls Gamemaster Screen (2015)
  - Spellbook of the Uruks (2016)
  - Quest for the Crown (2016)
  - The Last Adventure of Big Jack Brass (2016)
  - Solo 28: Grimtina's Guard (2016)
  - Goblin Lake (Deluxe) (2016)
  - Agent of Death (Deluxe) (2016)
  - Capture the Troll (2016)
  - The Fairy Spell Book (2016)
  - The Trollgod's Terrible Twenty (2017)
  - Solo 4: Naked Doom (Deluxe) (2017)
  - Mongoni Island (2017)
  - Solo 12: Arena of Khazan (Deluxe) (2017)
  - The Vaults of K'horror (2018), with Andy Holmes
  - The Peacock Continent of Trollworld (2018)
  - Monster Maze of Zorr (2018)
  - Trollstone Caverns: Lair of the Silver Serpent (2019)
  - Dragons Attack X'venn (2019)
  - The Wizard's Test: Deadly Combat (T&T version) (2020)
  - Vvvarrr's Qiip: Deadly Combat (T&T version) (2020)
  - Murder at the Ruptured Troll (2020)
  - The Non-Human Spell Book (2020)
  - Khara Khang's Random Rainbow Maze: Deadly Combat (T&T version) (2020)
  - Grimtooth's Tomb of the Warhammer (2020)
  - Goblin Crag: Level One (2020), with Andy Holmes
- WHAP (Wildly Heroic Action Pulp) RPG
  - Howls in the Wild (2010)
  - Cowboys vs. Dinosaurs (2010)

== Other role-playing game related subjects ==
- The 1st Annual World Who's Who in Tunnels and Trolls (1978)
- The 2nd Annual World Who's Who in Tunnels and Trolls (1979)
- Ten Days in the Arena of Khazan, originally printed in Different Worlds Issue 7 (1980)
- The History of Trollworld, a Tunnels & Trolls Fragmentary Chronology (2008)
- A Fragmentary History of Trollworld (2010)

== Novels and Short Stories ==
- "Murder at the Ruptured Troll" (1982), originally printed in Pegasus (game magazine), issue 8, reprinted under Trollgodfather Press imprint (2020)
- "Old Soldiers Never" (1989), in Shrapnel: Fragments from the Inner Sphere, a Battletech anthology. (ISBN 978-1-555600-82-2)
- "Turtle in the Tower" (1990), in Shadowrun: Into the Shadows edited by Jordan K. Weisman. An anthology of stories based on the Shadowrun role-playing game. (ISBN 1-55560-118-9).
- "The Two Worst Thieves in Khazan" (1992) in Mage's Blood and Old Bones: A Tunnels & Trolls Anthology (ISBN 978-0-940244-66-5)
- "The Triple Death" (1995), in Enchanted Forests edited by Katharine Kerr and Martin H. Greenberg. An anthology of stories about magical woods. (ISBN 0-88677-672-4).
- "A Day in the Life of a Thief" (2005) in Golden Heroes, an anthology published by Pisces All Media.
- Dragon Child: Just a Thief from Khazan (2006), by Ken St. Andre and James L. Shipman. A fantasy novel based on the Tunnels & Trolls role-playing game. Expanded and republished in 2017 as "Thief of Khazan".
- Griffin Feathers (2008), by Ken St. Andre. A collection of linked short stories based on the Tunnels & Trolls role-playing game. (ISBN 978-1-493674-49-7)
- "Introduction: Trollgod's Treasure Hunt" and "The Awakening" with James L. Shipman (2008) in Troll Tunnels, edited by Christina Lea. A collection of short sword and sorcery tales. (ISBN 978-0-024279-78-1)
- "The Mermaid's Curse," "Boozer's Tale", "Troll Hunt", "Flight from Tharathor", "The Last Adventure of Big Jack Brass", "Rogues in the Castle", and "Monsters! Monsters! Gristlegrim's Adventure", in Trolls Blood and Old Delvers (2008)
- "Champion of Stormgaard" (2010), an excerpt from the novel Rose of Stormgaard
- "Pirate Days Along the Yann" (2020)
- "Mandrikor: A Trollworld Tale" (2020)
- "Woden's Ring: A Heroic Fantasy Tale" (2020)
- "Fairy Tale" (2021)
- "The Trollgod's Tale" (2021)
- "Tomb Raiders from Trollhalla" (2021). Adapted from a game of T&T run by Ken St. Andre with players from his Trollhalla fan group.
- "Final Exam" (2021). A short novel based on a play-through of the solo adventure of the same name.
- Tales of Trollhalla #1: "The Serpent Queen" (2021)
- Rose of Stormgaard: A Trollworld Novel (2012), by Ken St. Andre, cover art by Steve Crompton. (ISBN 1-4801-7576-5).
- "Slithery Jungle Tales", issue 1 (2022)
- "Temple Rescue" (2022). A narrative of a play through of Temple of Issoth T&T solo adventure by Dan Hembree. Illustrated by William W. Connors.
- "Slithery Jungle Tales", issue 2 (2023)

== Flash Fiction ==
- "Moral Invaders" (2005) in Flash Fantastic, No. 16. A very short story in issue 16 of the online magazine.
- Ken St. Andre's "A Troll's Flash Fiction" story collection contains flash fiction written by him but also collected from other authors. Stories published between 2011 and 2015.

== Comic Books ==
- "Goblin Dreams", a Monsters! Monsters! comic (1995)
- "Monsters! Monsters!", issue 1: "Return to Goblin Lake" (Trollgodfather Press Comic Group, 2022). A republication of the "Goblin Dreams" comic (1995), illustrated by Gilead Artist.

== Board Games ==
- Dwarves and Dragon (2013)

== Card Games ==
- Ogreocre (2010)

== Computer Games ==
- Adventure Construction Set adventure "Galactic Agent" (Amiga version, 1986)
- Wasteland (1988)
- Wasteland 2 (2014)
