= Blue frog =

The term blue frog may refer to:

- Blue poison dart frog (Dentrobates tinctorius "azureus"), a frog in the family Dendrobatidae found in southern Suriname and adjacent far northern Brazil
- Australian green tree frog (Litoria caerulea), a frog in the family Hylidae native to Australia and New Guinea, actually green but originally called "blue frog" due to damaged specimens
- Various characters:
  - Rockit, a blue-colour tree frog in The Roly Mo Show
  - Pierre, a blue-and-yellow frog in Sesame Street (Japan)

As Blue Frog, it may also refer to:

- Blue Frog, an anti-spamming service
- Blue Frog Bar and Grill, a Western-style cuisine restaurant chain company in China
- "The Little Blue Frog", a Miles Davis track added to Big Fun
- "I'm In Love With a Big Blue Frog", a Peter, Paul, & Mary song on Album 1700
- "Blue Frog Tavern", a solo adventure for role-playing game Tunnels & Trolls
