= Crystal Island =

Crystal Island may refer to:

- Crystal Island (building project), a future building project in Moscow, Russia
- Crystal Island: Uncharted Discovery, an educational video game
- Crystal Island (Ontario), an island in the Detroit river
- Crystal Island (game), a 1990s heroic fantasy play-by-mail game
