= Agent of Death =

1983 role-playing game adventure

Agent of Death is a 1983 role-playing game adventure published by Infinity Limited for Tunnels & Trolls.

== Plot summary ==
Agent of Death is an adventure in which three interconnected solo adventures are included. These three loosely connected dungeon scenarios are designed for powerful 'megacharacters' operating in a parallel version of the main game universe. Players navigate through 290 numbered paragraphs, choosing paths that lead to varied encounters—from a mission to deliver a fatal kiss for a queen, to explorations among dwarves, underground elves, and eccentric NPCs. The adventure offers a wide range of experiences including combat, commerce, transformation, and even marriage, with multiple endings and pacing that allows for both action and rest.

== Publication history ==
Agent of Death was written by Ken St. Andre and published by Infinity Limited in 1983 as a 16-page tabloid newspaper format.

== Reception ==
Harry White reviewed Agent of Death for Fantasy Gamer magazine and stated that "Is it worth the price? Yes, if you like T&T solitaires, can tolerate the lack of coherence, and want to take the trouble to keep the thing from physically falling apart as you play it. If you are not such a fan, avoid it."
