= The Dungeon of the Bear =

Role-playing game supplement

The Dungeon of the Bear is a 1979 role-playing game adventure for Tunnels & Trolls written by Jim "Bear" Peters and published by Flying Buffalo. Originally published as three separate booklets (Level 1, Level 2, Level 3) these were combined with an entrance-level (Castle Ward, written by Michael Stackpole) and republished in 1982 as "The Complete Dungeon of the Bear". A referee is required to play.

== Plot summary ==
The Dungeon of the Bear is a dungeon scenario. Halls echo with the clash of swords and the tramp of Orcish boots. Monsters - Orcs, Trolls, wicked Warlocks and others store the treasures won by their villainy here. Castle Ward, built to prevent adventurers from entering the monsters lair, lies abandoned after an outbreak of dungeon creatures reduced it to semi-ruins.

== Reception ==
Forrest Johnson reviewed The Dungeon of the Bear in The Space Gamer No. 28. Johnson commented that "The Dungeon of the Bear is a cut or two above the average - highly recommended for puerile, masochistic fans of T&T."
