= Michael A. Stackpole =

Science fiction author

- Stackpole at Dragon Con in 2026
- Born: November 27, 1957 (age 68); Wausau, Wisconsin, U.S.
- Education: University of Vermont (BA)
- Occupations: Writer, game designer
- Writing career
- Period: 1977–present
- Genres: Role-playing games, video games, fantasy, science fiction novels

Michael Austin Stackpole (born November 27, 1957) is an American science fiction and fantasy author best known for his Star Wars and BattleTech books. He was born in Wausau, Wisconsin, but raised in Vermont. He has a BA in history from the University of Vermont. From 1977 on, he worked as a designer of role-playing games for various gaming companies, and wrote dozens of magazine articles with limited distribution within the industry. He lives in Scottsdale, Arizona.

== Game design career ==
Michael Stackpole was hired full-time at Flying Buffalo after they accepted his submission for a solo Tunnels & Trolls adventure which was published in 1978 as City of Terrors. He wrote columns on industry news and reviews for Flying Buffalo's magazine Sorcerer's Apprentice. Stackpole worked for Coleco from 1980 to 1981 after Rick Loomis, Stackpole, and the president of Coleco met at a gaming and pinball convention. Stackpole designed the roleplaying game Mercenaries, Spies and Private Eyes, which Flying Buffalo published in 1983. Stackpole left Flying Buffalo after the company's 1985 move to Scottsdale, Arizona. Stackpole, Ken St. Andre, and Liz Danforth designed the computer roleplaying game Wasteland, published by Interplay in 1988. He later returned to work with his fellow creators of Wasteland as a writer on its sequel Wasteland 2, released in 2014 by inXile Entertainment.

In response to the accusations of Patricia Pulling (among others) who felt that the "occult" elements of Dungeons & Dragons were driving people to suicide, Stackpole began to defend the game and the roleplaying game community. Stackpole published one of his first articles about the role-playing games misinformation from the media in Sorcerer's Apprentice #14 (Spring 1982) as an article titled "Devil Games? Nonsense!", and even debated the Western Regional Director of Pulling's BADD organization on a radio program broadcast on July 14, 1987. He compared BADD's statistics of suicides among role-playing gamers to the rate of general teen suicide and found the percentage of roleplayers committing suicide was actually lower than those who were not gamers, and published his argument in an article called "The Truth about Role-Playing Games" in the 1989 book Satanism in America; he also published the document "The Pulling Report" in 1990, which further discredited Pulling's stand against roleplaying games.

In the 1980s, Stackpole began designing computer games for Coleco and then Interplay Productions. His work at Interplay included Bard's Tale III, Wasteland, Neuromancer, Star Trek: 25th Anniversary and Star Trek: Judgment Rites. He also created the role-playing game Mercenaries, Spies and Private Eyes, which provided the game mechanics for Wasteland, and wrote several solo adventures for the Tunnels & Trolls role-playing system, including "Dargon's Dungeon", "Overkill", "City of Terrors" and "Sewers of Oblivion".

Stackpole loaned his image to Decipher for the image of Corran Horn used in their Star Wars Customizable Card Game expansion "Reflections 2". Timothy Zahn did likewise for the character Talon Karrde. Stackpole teamed up with Decipher again, helping them write the background story to their WARS TCG, including e-books and other writing tie-ins for the expanded universe.

In January, 2019 Stackpole resigned from the Board of Directors of GAMA (Game Manufacturer's Association), citing its inactivity and the poor handling of an incident involving GAMA President Stephen Brissaud. He was one of the few remaining emeritus Directors (alongside Rick Loomis and Will Niebling).

== Writing career ==
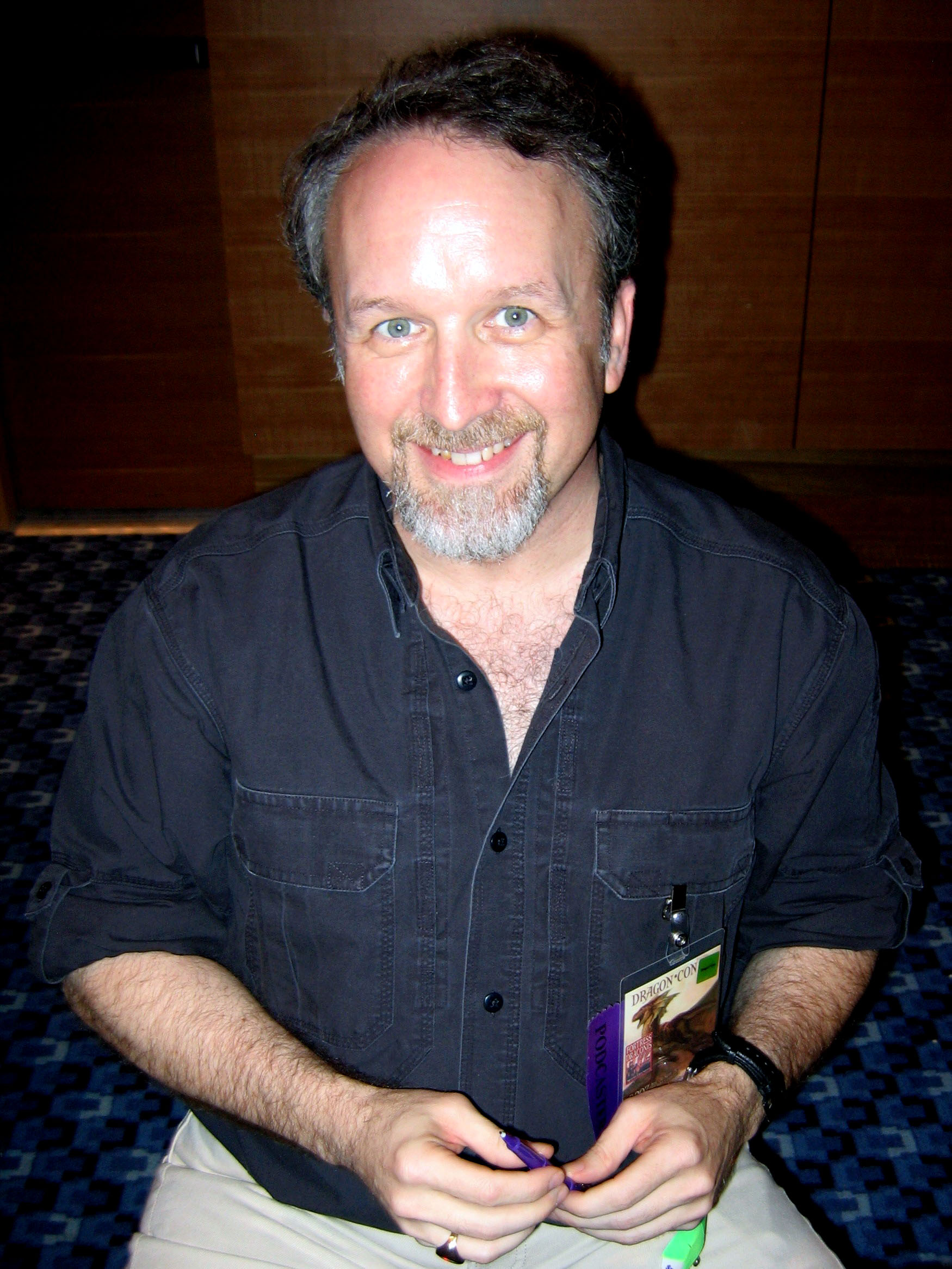
Michael A. Stackpole at Dragon Con 2007

In 1986 Stackpole wrote his first novel, the fantasy story Talion: Revenant. His editors believed that a 175,000 word book was too long for an unknown author and that the story wasn't particularly engaging. The story remained unpublished for the next 11 years until reworked by Stackpole's editor, Anne Lesley Groell. Stackpole clarifies these issues himself in the afterword of the published version of Talion. The manuscript was published in 1997 by Bantam Books.

Stackpole's first published novels were the Warrior trilogy for the BattleTech universe, published by FASA in 1988–1989. His "Blood of Kerensky" trilogy (1989–1991) were the last novels that FASA directly published; BattleTech: The Animated Series (1994) was set during the events of this trilogy. Stackpole also wrote a trilogy of novels published in 1992, which were based on the Dark Conspiracy roleplaying game by GDW.

Stackpole has found his greatest success in serial works that continue the characters and plot lines developed by other authors. In 1987 he began writing novels set in the BattleTech universe for FASA Corporation, some of which were used as the source for a television animated series. He was then selected to write several novels in the Star Wars universe for Bantam Books. He also wrote several comics based in the Star Wars universe for Dark Horse Comics. Initially these covered the period just before his X-Wing novels. Later, he also covered the marriage of Luke Skywalker and Mara Jade in the graphic novel Union and collaborated with Timothy Zahn on Mara Jade's early career. In the foreword to his book Outbound Flight, Timothy Zahn thanks Stackpole and issues a challenge at Star Wars Trivial Pursuit.

In addition, he has written several novels and short stories with original settings. One series is the DragonCrown War Cycle. These books successfully broke fantasy conventions, including the introduction of firearms in a fantasy setting. Reception of these books was very positive based on Amazon reviews, only a review elsewhere was not as good.

Stackpole contributed one of the four stories in Roger Zelazny's shared world anthology Forever After, published by Baen Books in 1995. He was a contributor in the 1998 anthology Lord of the Fantastic commemorating Zelazny.

The Age of Discovery trilogy is his latest complete series, with A New World released mid-2007. The trilogy is set in a fantasy world, with an attempt at an unconventional approach to magic and mastery.

The Crown Colonies is a trilogy that re-imagines the events of the American Revolutionary War. The first book, At The Queen's Command, was released in November 2010.

At New York Comic Con 2012, it was revealed that Blizzard Entertainment had approached Stackpole to write the next novel in their series based on the popular MMORPG, World of Warcraft. The novel, titled Vol’jin: Shadows of the Horde, centres around the chieftain of the Darkspear Trolls as his loyalty to the Horde is put to the ultimate test after an assassination attempt on his life. The novel was released in July 2013.

In 2023 he was elected Grandmaster of the International Association of Media Tie-In Writers, citing his contributions to "Star Wars, Battletech, Dark Conspiracy, and Warcraft universes."

== The Secrets ==
=== Newsletter ===
Stackpole also writes and publishes an online newsletter titled The Secrets, which offers tips, tricks, and tidbits about fan fiction writing (focusing on, but not limited to, science fiction and fantasy). It is aimed towards the serious fan fiction writer and some casual writers, and includes information about getting books published..

Topics discussed in the newsletter range from how to beat writer's block to how to build a world, and even how to manage writing as a career.

The Secrets newsletter requires a subscription, and issues are released every two weeks.

=== Podcast ===
The Secrets Newsletter has an "audio companion" in The Secrets Podcast. The first ten podcasts were based on material from the first ten issues of The Secrets newsletter. After the first series ended, the content of the podcast diverged from the newsletter. The podcasts average twenty-five minutes long and are voiced and produced by Stackpole.

The podcasts are free and require no subscription, but older episodes have been retired and are no longer available on the main archive.

Stackpole is also one of the main hosts on The Dragon Page Cover to Cover, a book review and interview show dealing mainly with fantasy and sci fi publications, together with Michael R. Mennenga.

== Skepticism ==
Stackpole has been the executive director of the Phoenix Skeptics since 1988 and is listed as the contact for the group in the magazine Skeptical Inquirer.

== Asteroid ==
An outer main-belt asteroid discovered March 23, 2001 by David B. Healy was named 165612 Stackpole.

== Novels ==
=== DragonCrown War ===
Published by Bantam Books.

- 2000 The Dark Glory War
- 2001 Fortress Draconis
- 2002 When Dragons Rage
- 2003 The Grand Crusade

=== Age of Discovery ===
Published by Bantam Books.

- 2005 A Secret Atlas
- 2006 Cartomancy
- 2007 The New World

=== The Crown Colonies ===
Published by Night Shade Books.

- 2010 At The Queen's Command.
- 2011 Of Limited Loyalty.

=== Homeland Security Services ===
- 2011 Perfectly Invisible (Stormwolf.com)

=== World of Warcraft ===
- 2013 Vol'jin: Shadows of the Horde

=== BattleTech ===
The BattleTech novels were originally published by FASA Corporation up until 1991. In that year, Penguin Group/Roc Books took over the line and also reprinted the earlier novels. The last print novel of the classic BattleTech setting was published in 2002; in the same year, the first novel for the Dark Age setting (set some 100 years after the classic setting) was published, written by Stackpole. His novels were typically "spine novels" that moved the setting ahead, narrating large-scale or otherwise important events with far-reaching consequences in the fictional timeline.

Warrior Trilogy

- 1988 Warrior: En Garde (FASA, ROC reprint)
- 1988 Warrior: Riposte (FASA, ROC reprint)
- 1989 Warrior: Coupé (FASA, ROC reprint)

Blood of Kerensky Trilogy

- 1989 Lethal Heritage (FASA, ROC reprint)
- 1990 Blood Legacy (FASA, ROC reprint)
- 1991 Lost Destiny (FASA, ROC reprint)

Other BattleTech Spine Novels

- 1992 Natural Selection (novel) (ROC)
- 1993 Assumption of Risk (ROC)
- 1994 Bred For War (ROC)
- 1996 Malicious Intent (ROC)
- 1997 Grave Covenant (ROC) - Twilight of the Clans series #2
- 1998 Prince of Havoc (ROC) - Twilight of the Clans series #7

Mechwarrior - Dark Age setting

- 2002 Ghost War (ROC/WizKids)
- 2007 Masters of War (ROC/WizKids)

=== Star Wars ===
- 1996 X-Wing: Rogue Squadron (Bantam Books)
- 1996 X-Wing: Wedge's Gamble (Bantam Books)
- 1996 X-Wing: The Krytos Trap (Bantam Books)
- 1997 X-Wing: The Bacta War (Bantam Books)
- 1998 I, Jedi (Bantam Books)
- 1999 X-Wing: Isard's Revenge (Bantam Books)
- 2000 The New Jedi Order - Dark Tide I: Onslaught (Del Rey Books)
- 2000 The New Jedi Order - Dark Tide II: Ruin (Del Rey Books)

=== Dark Conspiracy ===
Published by GDW.

- 1991 A Gathering Evil
- 1991 Evil Ascending
- 1992 Evil Triumphant

=== Others ===
- 1994 Once a Hero (Bantam Books)
- 1994 Dementia (Roc/Target)
- 1997 Talion: Revenant (Bantam Books)
- 1997 A Hero Born (HarperPrism)
- 1998 An Enemy Reborn (HarperPrism)
- 1998 Wolf and Raven (Roc/FASA)
- 1998 Eyes of Silver (Bantam Books)
- 2010 In Hero Years I'm Dead (Stormwolf.com)
- 2011 Conan the Barbarian (Berkley Books)
- 2014 The Crusader Road (Paizo Publishing)

== Other publications ==
- 1982 Grimtooth's Traps Too (co-author)
- 1982 Citybook I: Butcher, Baker, Candlestick Maker (co-author)
- 1984 Citybook II: Port o' Call (co-author, co-editor)
- 1987 Citybook III: Deadly Nightside (co-author, editor)
- 1988 Lords of Darkness (co-author)
- 1989 Game Hysteria and the Truth
- 1990 The Pulling Report
- 1990 Citybook IV: On the Road (co-author, contributing editor)
- 1990 Sprawl Sites (co-author)
- Wiseman, Loren K. (1991). "Questions and Answers about Role Playing Games". Game Manufacturers Association (GAMA).
- 1991 Citybook V: Sideshow (co-author)
- 1994 GAMA News, Model Retailer, March, 98–99
- 1995 ACE Books, Superheroes (Edited by Lynne Varley) Peer Review
- 1995 Magic the Gathering: Tapestries (Edited by Kathy Ice), What's In A Name?
- 1996 Magic the Gathering: Distant Planes (Edited by Kathy Ice), Insufficient Evidence
- 2010 Steampunk'd (Edited by Jean Rabe and Martin H. Greenberg), Chance Corrigan and the Tick Tock King of the Nile
- 2012 Complete Kobold Guide to Game Design (co-author)
- 2012 The Kobold Guide to Worldbuilding (co-author)
- 2013 A Hero by Any Other Name (Short story anthology edited by Jean Rabe)
