= When the Cat's Away (Tunnels & Trolls) =

When the Cat's Away is a 1993 role-playing adventure for Tunnels & Trolls published by Flying Buffalo.

== Plot summary ==
When the Cat's Away is an adventure in which two new solo adventures are presented along with Sorcerer Solitaire.

== Publication history ==
Shannon Appelcline noted that after 1985, "The last four Flying Buffalo full-sized solo adventures were published over the next several years: Red Circle (1987), Caravan to Tiern (1989), Dark Temple (1991), and When the Cat's Away (1993). By the time they were published, some of the adventures had been waiting for years."

== Reception ==
Andrew Greenberg reviewed When the Cat's Away in White Wolf #42 (April, 1994), rating it a 2.5 out of 5 and stated that "Considering that the 80-page book costs under $10, I say go for it."

== Reviews ==
- Dragon #206
