= Ken St. Andre =

American writer and game designer (1947–2026)

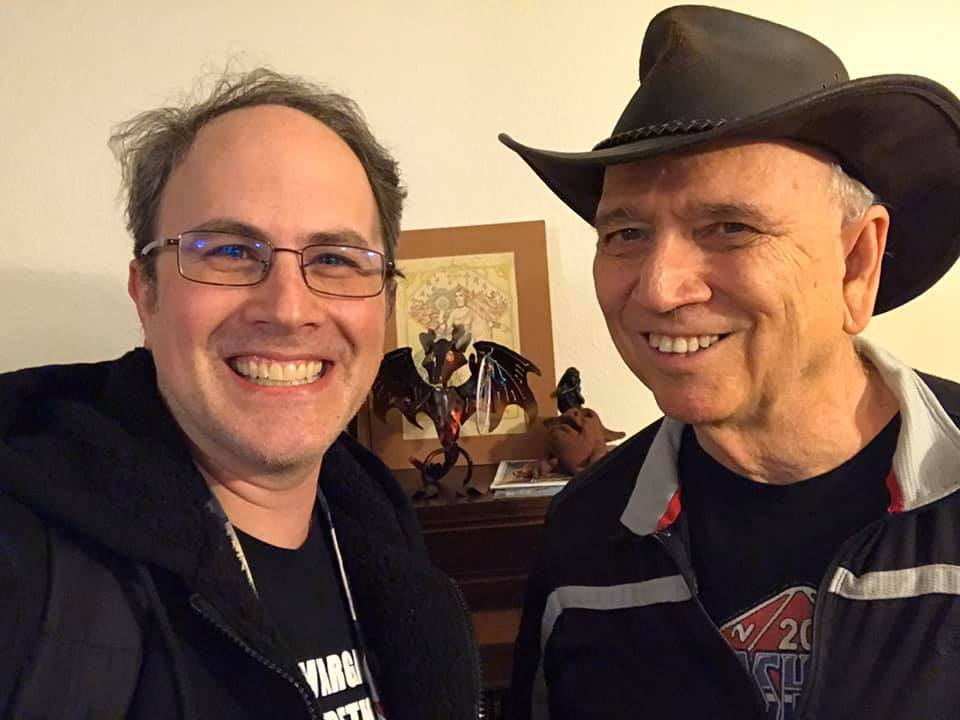
- St. Andre (right) at his residence in Phoenix, Arizona, with friend Bernard Assaf (left), 2020
- Born: Kenneth Eugene St. Andre; April 28, 1947; Ogden, Utah, U.S.
- Died: November 15, 2026 (aged 79)
- Other names: "Ken", "Trollgod", "Trollgodfather"
- Occupations: Game designer, writer
- Spouses: Catherine (div. 2012); Rocio (m. 2024)
- Writing career
- Period: 1975–2026
- Genres: Role-playing games, fantasy

Kenneth Eugene St. Andre (April 28, 1947 – November 15, 2026) was an American fantasy game designer and author, best known for creating the fantasy role-playing game Tunnels & Trolls (T&T) and the computer role-playing game, Wasteland.

In 1975, St. Andre wrote rules for a fantasy role-playing game he called Tunnels & Trolls (T&T) as a rebellion against the recently published Dungeons & Dragons which he felt was heavily dependent on the use of miniatures, with which he had no experience. In the following decades he published several editions of, and adventures for, T&T, including rules and adventures for a monsters-as-heroes variation named Monsters! Monsters! (M!M!).

St. Andre maintained a more than 40-year long professional partnership with Rick Loomis, founder of game publisher Flying Buffalo, which published various Tunnels & Trolls editions and products starting in 1975 and until Flying Buffalo's sale in 2021. He continued to write fiction and gaming materials published under the Trollhalla Press Unlimited imprint, for items produced with his game design partner and artist Steve Crompton, and under the Trollgodfather Press imprint, for everything else St. Andre published.

He was an active member of The Science Fiction and Fantasy Writers of America from 1989. In June 2018, The Academy of Adventure Gaming Arts & Design inducted St. Andre into its Hall of Fame.

== Game design ==
Ken St. Andre first saw the Dungeons & Dragons role-playing game in April 1975, and after concluding that the rules did not make sense, he designed his own simpler game. St. Andre ultimately called his game Tunnels & Trolls, and printed 100 copies of the first edition in 1975. He asked Rick Loomis of Flying Buffalo to sell 40 copies of Tunnels & Trolls at Origins in July 1975. When those copies sold out, Flying Buffalo acquired the publishing rights to the game and published St. Andre's second edition of T&T in December 1975. In addition to writing the game rules, Ken was one of the creators of solitaire adventures which allowed players to experience the game without a game master or judge. St. Andre has written many modules and stand alone adventures for Tunnels & Trolls, including the gamebooks Deathtrap Equalizer Dungeon and Naked Doom in 1977 after Loomis's own Buffalo Castle.

Flying Buffalo published several editions of T&T throughout the years, all written by St. Andre, including 2nd, 3rd, 4th, 5th, and 5.5th editions between 1975 and 2005. Fiery Dragon Productions published a 30th anniversary 7th edition and 7.5th editions in 2005 and 2008, respectively, skipping an official 6th edition due to controversy surrounding a fan-made, self-proclaimed 6th edition. St. Andre collaborated with an independent French publisher on an 8th edition in 2012. In 2015 Flying Buffalo released a Kickstarter-funded Deluxe Edition of T&T, authored by St. Andre, Steve Crompton, Elizabeth Danforth and James "Bear" Peters, known as "The Fellowship of the Troll". As of 2024, Deluxe T&T stands as the latest edition of T&T published.

St. Andre designed Starfaring, published by Flying Buffalo in 1976 as the first science fiction role-playing game ever published.

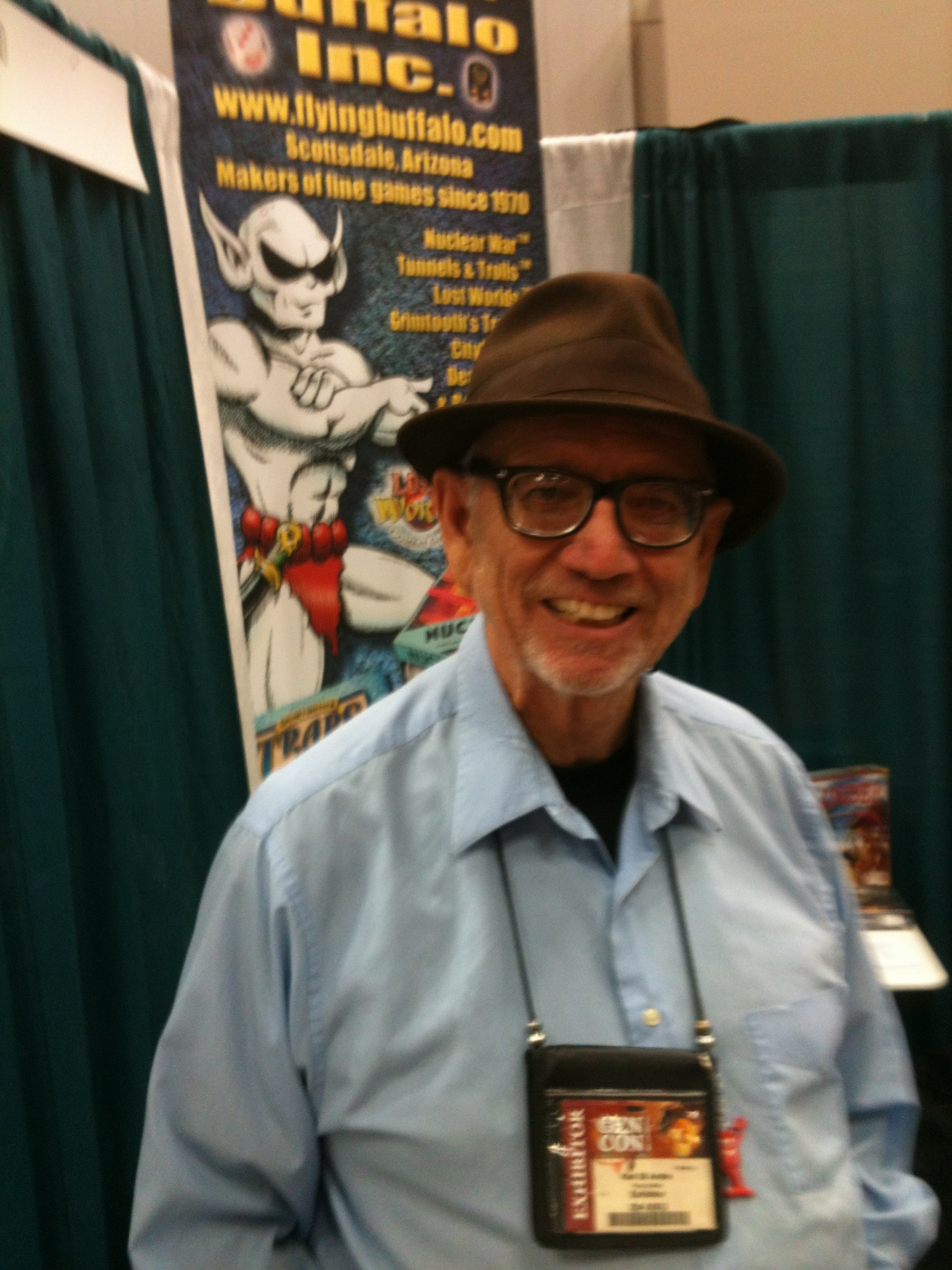
St. Andre at Gen Con Indy 2014

His third game, Monsters! Monsters!, was published by Metagaming Concepts in 1976; Flying Buffalo acquired the rights to publish a second printing in 1979, although St. Andre maintained ownership of the game.

Following the death of Rick Loomis in 2019, St. Andre released a 2nd edition of Monsters! Monsters! with expanded rules along with an updated The Toughest Dungeon in the World adventure module, both published by Trollhalla Press Unlimited in 2020. St. Andre's aim was to separate M!M! from its parent game, Tunnels & Trolls. After the sale of Flying Buffalo and Tunnels & Trolls to Webbed Sphere in 2021, St. Andre moved the stories and characters still under his control to a new world named Zimrala with the release of Ken St. Andre's Monsterary of Zimrala in 2022. In 2023 he published an expanded 2.7th edition of Monsters! Monsters!, which moved the setting firmly into Zimrala.

St. Andre designed Chaosium's first licensed role-playing game, Stormbringer, in 1981; he helped create its 2nd, 3rd and 4th editions.

With Liz Danforth and Michael Stackpole, St. Andre designed the post-apocalyptic computer role-playing game Wasteland, a game published by Interplay in 1988. He rejoined Danforth and Stackpole as part of the design team of Wasteland 2, released in 2014.

== Personal life and death ==
Kenneth Eugene St. Andre was born on April 28, 1947. He was married twice and had two children from his first marriage to Catherine. He lived in Sun City, Arizona with his second wife, Maria Del Rocio Ulloa Lopez.

St. Andre lived in Sun City. He previously lived in Phoenix, Arizona. He had two children, a daughter, Jillian, and a son, James. On August 27, 2010, St. Andre retired after 36 years of service to the city of Phoenix as a public librarian. On July 1, 2024, St. Andre married María del Rocío Ulloa López, a Mexican and American citizen.

Following an over decade long battle with cancer, St. Andre died in Phoenix, Arizona, on November 15, 2026; he was 79.

== Awards and honors ==
In 1986, St. Andre was the first editor for a fan club newsletter based around the Adventure Construction Set video game, one of the rare cases of a professional designer leading gamer activities for another designer's game.

St. Andre was chosen by vote as a "famous game designer" to be featured as the king of spades in Flying Buffalo's 2014 Famous Game Designers Playing Card Deck.

In June 2018, The Academy of Adventure Gaming Arts & Design inducted St. Andre into its Hall of Fame.

== See also ==
- Ken St. Andre bibliography
