= Circle of Ice =

Tabletop role-playing game adventure

Circle of Ice is a 1980 role-playing game adventure for Tunnels & Trolls published by Flying Buffalo.

== Plot summary ==
Circle of Ice is a solo adventure in which the Realm of the Dark, which perpetually wars against the Realm of the Light, asks the player character to investigate the neutral Circle of Ice.

== Reception ==
Forrest Johnson reviewed Circle of Ice in The Space Gamer No. 35. Johnson commented that "All in all, a pretty impressive effort. If you don't mind paying a couple of bucks for half an hour's entertainment, this supplement is for you."

== Legacy ==
Circle of Ice was reprinted in 2014 as part of the Adventurer's Compendium book and the original cover of Circle of Ice was also used as the cover for the Adventurer's Compendium.
