= Abyss (Flying Buffalo) =

Abyss is a 1980 role-playing game adventure for Tunnels & Trolls published by Flying Buffalo.

== Plot summary ==
Abyss is a solitaire adventure for a Tunnels & Trolls player character who has died, and the character's journey through the underworld for rebirth.

== Reception ==
Jerry Epperson reviewed Abyss in The Space Gamer No. 33. Epperson commented that "Abyss, for all its deadliness, belongs in every T&T player's library."

Clayton Miner reviewed Abyss: Pocket Adventure #2 for Pegasus magazine and stated that "The main feature of this item is that it is fun to run through, regardless of the chances of success or failure, and any player who is looking for some additional plat after their character has been slain should pick this up."
