= Sea of Mystery =

Tabletop role-playing game supplement

Sea of Mystery is a 1981 role-playing game adventure for Tunnels & Trolls published by Flying Buffalo.

== Plot summary ==
Sea of Mystery is a solo adventure in which the player character encounters pirates, slave galleys, storms and more on the high seas.

== Reception ==
Anders Swenson reviewed Sea of Mystery for Different Worlds magazine and stated that "I liked this adventure. Actually, I like the solo adventures that Flying Buffalo publishes generally, and this booklet is of similar quality to the other adventures in the line. Specifically, though, it provides a relatively low-key interlude between adventures which are a bit deadlier. This solo adventure features color and playability over danger and gross rewards. It is a good buy, especially when you consider the price."

Russ Williams reviewed Sea of Mystery in The Space Gamer No. 49. Williams commented that "The situations are quite varied. I found one or two a bit hard to swallow, and some seemed contrived. However, it is basically a good, solid adventure with a welcome change in format from most other Flying Buffalo solo dungeons. I recommend it."
