= T&T Survival Kit =

Tabletop role-playing game supplement

T&T Survival Kit is a 1981 role-playing game supplement published by Flying Buffalo for Tunnels & Trolls.

== Contents ==
T&T Survival Kit is a plastic 3-ring notebook that folds out so that it can also be used as a gamemaster's screen.

== Reception ==
Forrest Johnson reviewed T&T Survival Kit in The Space Gamer No. 43. Pulsipher commented that "A high quality product [...] I predict will see use in a lot of games, besides the one for which it was intended."
