= Catacombs of the Bear Cult =

Role-playing game adventure

Catacombs of the Bear Cult is a 1981 role-playing game adventure for Tunnels & Trolls published by Flying Buffalo.

== Plot summary ==
Catacombs of the Bear Cult is an adventure in which the Death Empress puts a bounty on werebear cultists of the Great Bear Cult who come down from the hills to rob caravans traveling the Great Highway, so the player characters search the wilderness for their headquarters.

== Reception ==
W.G. Armintrout reviewed Catacombs of the Bear Cult in The Space Gamer No. 54. Armintrout commented that "If you play T&T, buy this. If you don't – well, this and the rulebook would be a good place to start!"
