= A Secret Atlas =

- Cover
- Author: Michael Stackpole
- Illustrator: Michael Gellatly (internal map)
- Cover artist: Stephen Youll (art), Jamie Warren Youll (design)
- Language: English
- Series: Age of Discovery
- Genre: Fantasy novel
- Publisher: Bantam Books
- Publication date: 2005
- Publication place: United States
- Media type: Print (Paperback)
- Pages: 460 pp (paperback)
- ISBN: 0-553-38237-3
- OCLC: 56198924
- Dewey Decimal: 813/.54 22
- LC Class: PS3569.T137 S73 2005
- Followed by: Cartomancy (novel)

A Secret Atlas is the first book in the Age of Discovery series of fantasy novels by Michael Stackpole. It was published by Bantam Books in 2005.

== Background ==
The book is set on one continent in a world gradually recovering from a cataclysm known as the Time of Black Ice. More than seven centuries previously, this event dramatically transformed the geography of the land, reduced populations, and caused a dramatic shift in the balance of power between the different races inhabiting the continent, allowing humans to reach a position of dominance.

The immediate cause of this catastrophe was a war between an Empire that covered most of the continent and barbarians from the Turca Wastes to the north. An army led by the Empress Cyrsa included warriors of such ability they could reach a state called jaedunto, allowing them to touch jaedun, the wild magic that flowed through everything. These were known as jaecai.

When jaecai fought, especially against similarly powerful opponents, wild excess magic was released that had unpredictable and long-lasting effects on the site of the battle.

The Turasynd Campaign created a maelstrom of wild magic that devastated the north, and destroyed both sides. Nothing was ever found of the Empress, nor forces from either side, all presumed consumed by the devastations.

Years of magic storms followed, destroying much of the world. Before the Empress departed on her expedition, she divided the Empire into Nine Principalities for safekeeping. Among the long-term repercussions of the cataclysm, populations were reduced and settlements were wiped out or cut off from each other. The Nine Principalities became separate and distinct states, with some subdividing further in the wake of the chaos. Of the old institutions of the Empire, bureaucracy remained to provide order in the recovery process.

Gradually, population increased, but at the time of the story, still below pre-Cataclysmic levels. As civilization returned slowly to normal, explorations were conducted to re-establish contacts between settlements, and to map out the world again.

== Plot summary ==
Qiro Anturasi, Royal Cartographer of Nalenyr, had been instrumental for his family's reputation as the most reliable map-charter in the known world. Merchants and princes all sought his clan's maps, even as the House of Anturasi continued sending out expeditions to expand their wealth of information, surveying unmapped territories, making detail notes of fauna, flora and geography.

The Anturasi had been vital to Nalenyr's growing wealth and rise in power. Considered a crucial state treasure that must not fall into the wrong hands, Qiro was confined, on orders and under protection of the Naleni princes, to his estate Anturasikun in Moriande, capital of Nalenyr. There, he continued to oversee his clan's map-making enterprise, training the scions of the clan into the family trade, ruthlessly subjecting them to rigorous training and demands, for more than half a century.

Now, the family stood poised on the brink of a historical breakthrough event which could catapult their standing further and beyond the imagination of rival map-makers. Intertwined with their mission were the political ramifications for Nalenyr, the aggressive northern state of Deseiron, and Helosunde which served as buffer between the two former powers. Much of Helosunde had been under Desei occupation, and Nalenyr provided Helosundian refugees sanctuary and support to confound Desei designs on Nalenyr.

Qiro's grandsons, Jorim and Keles, were tasked with undertakings that would take them in opposite directions. Jorim was to embark on a specially commissioned ship Stormwolf to make accurate longitudinal charts at sea with a secret new instrument. Keles was to tasked to rediscover the lost segment of the pre-Cataclysmic Spice Route, which would take him into ground zero of the Cataclysm, a region where the ancient wild magic still raged.

Nirati, sister to Jorim and Keles, remained behind in Moriande to hold the fort, for stakes were high and there were many hidden players whose intrigues threatened her beloved brothers.

Meanwhile, in the aftermath of the devastations caused by the wild magic, the jaecai who had not departed with Empress Cyrsa's expedition, continued the xidantzu tradition in their schools martial arts. Their best students became itinerant warriors who travelled the realms to help fight injustice without regard to political affiliations. Moraven Tolo was one such warrior. When hints to powerful cache of ancient weapons, imbued with magicks from their former wielders, came to his attention, the jaecais became concerned that opportunistic parties would see it as an easy means of raising a strong army without the necessary ability, discipline and experience to control the power, possibly leading to history repeating itself.
