= Beyond the Wall of Tears =

Role-playing game supplement

Beyond the Wall of Tears is a 1984 role-playing game adventure for Tunnels & Trolls published by Flying Buffalo.

== Plot summary ==
Beyond the Wall of Tears is a solo adventure in which the player character's younger sister has been kidnapped.

== Reception ==
Philip L. Wing reviewed Beyond the Wall of Tears in The Space Gamer No. 72. Wing commented that "Beyond the Wall of Tears makes a good, but not excellent, addition to your Tunnels & Trolls solo collection."
