= Overkill (Flying Buffalo) =

Role-playing game adventure

Overkill is a role-playing game adventure for Tunnels & Trolls published by Flying Buffalo.

== Plot summary ==
Overkill is an adventure for Tunnels & Trolls.

Unusually for solo adventures it allows for a party of characters to be used. The party has a maximum combined level of 12, so the player can choose a higher solo character or multiple lower level characters.

Any character can only navigate this adventure once, and on completion has conditions placed on taking other adventures. In some circumstances, the character is compelled to start other adventures (e.g. as punishment following court-martial).

== Publication history ==
Overkill was written in 1977 by Mike Brines and was redesigned in 1980 by Michael Stackpole.

== Reception ==
Gerald E. Giannattasio reviewed the Stackpole version of Overkill in The Space Gamer No. 31. Giannattasio commented that "The Stackpole Overkill is a sound solo adventure. The excessive difficulty of some routes will involve frustration. Overkill rewards perseverance with enjoyment."
