= Crystal Island (game) =

Play-by-mail role-playing game

- Designers: Saul Betesh
- Publishers: Saul Betesh
- Years active: ~1990 to 1995
- Genres: Role-playing, heroic fantasy
- Languages: English
- Players: Solo adventure
- Playing time: unlimited
- Materials required: Instructions, order sheets, turn results, paper, pencil
- Media type: Play-by-mail or email

Crystal Island is a closed-end, mixed-moderated, heroic fantasy play-by-mail game. It was published by Saul Betesh. Similar in gameplay to Advanced Dungeons & Dragons and Tunnels & Trolls this solo adventure was under way by 1990 as one of three starter games within Betesh's "Draconian System" which featured the expansive multi-player fantasy game DragonsKeep. Players generated a character for role-play with various attributes and skills, advancing by amassing experience points to increase levels. Players accomplished their goal by acquiring three keys and traveling to the Crystal Tower to complete a quest. The game received generally positive reviews in gaming magazines in the early 1990s.

== History and development ==
Crystal Island was published by Saul Betesh of Kingston, Ontario. It was mixed-moderated. Crystal Island was one of the components of Betesh's fantasy "Draconian System" based on Dungeons & Dragons. Reviewer Chris Gorde compared it to a combination of Advanced Dungeons & Dragons and Tunnels & Trolls. While the major game within this system was the expansive multiplayer DragonsKeep game, Crystal Island was one of the three solo preparatory games. (Note: The other two solo adventures were The Lost Mine and Dwarf Falls. By 1994, Dwarf Falls was no longer offered as "its entire database was lost in a system crash".) There were 40–50 players in 1990 and by 1992, the game had over 150 players.

== Gameplay ==
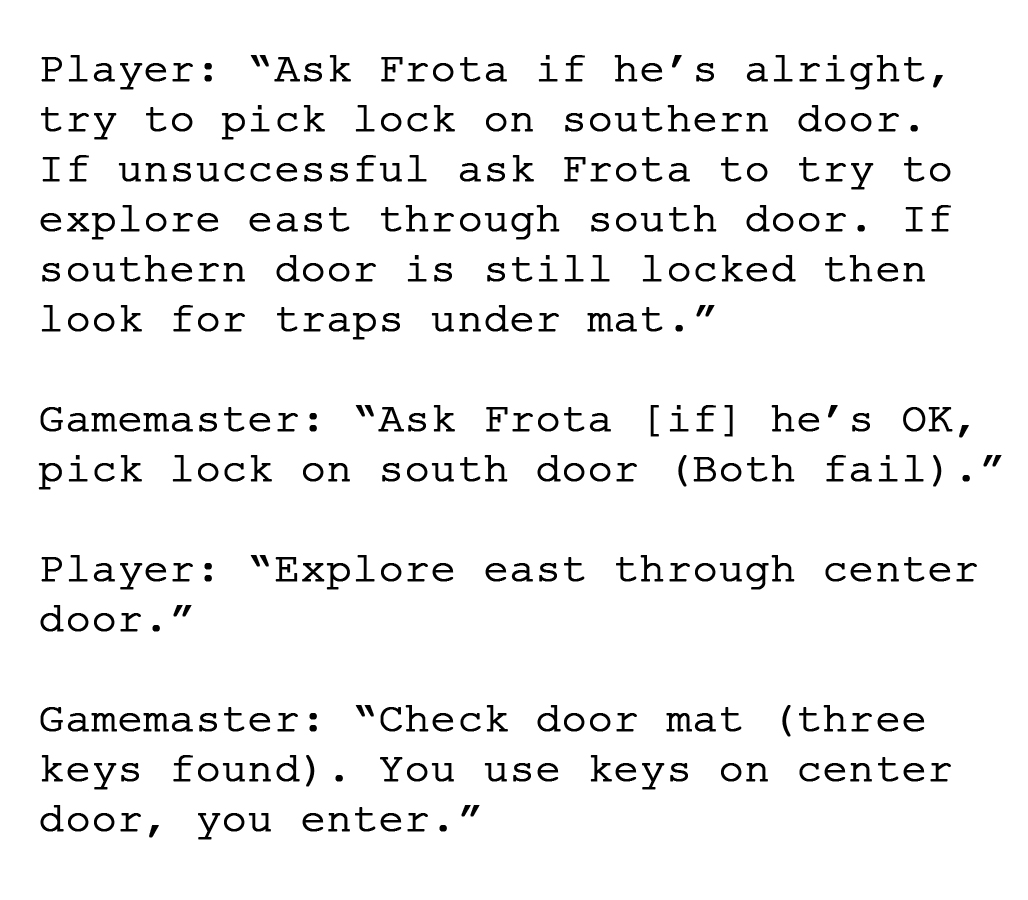
Example orders and turn results exchange between a player and the gamemaster.

Players begin by generating a character with various attributes including Constitution, Intelligence, Dexterity, Charisma, Luck, Perception, and Strength. Players could choose three skills which included: "Map reading, Traps/Maze, Language, Diplomacy, Swim, Animal/Bird, Boat/Fish, Mineral/Gem. Climbing, Gambling, Survival, Armor, Shield, Axe, Armor Repair and Weapon Repair". Players had two character types available, warrior or wizard, assigning one as dominant. Players advanced levels by amassing experience points and testing at their guild in a walled city. Turn orders were simple: players wrote orders in sentence form for the gamemaster (image right).

The game's purpose was "to find three mystic keys and eventually journey to the Crystal Tower, to find out why it has gone 'silent'". Along the way, players encountered various challenges such as "puzzles, traps, monsters, magic, and the like".

== Reception ==
Vickie Lloyd reviewed the game in the September–October 1992 issue of Paper Mayhem, stating that the game was "just plain fun to play"> She continued, "The game is easy to get into and play so if you' re interested in D&D but not making a career of reading rules, Crystal Island is the place for you." Chris Gorde reviewed the game in the January–February 1992 issue of Paper Mayhem saying, "I believe that CRYSTAL ISLAND is a game of merit. It's not a complicated game and shouldn't keep you up all night like some other games; nevertheless, for the money and effort needed to become successful in the Dragonspire world, I recommend it to novices and veterans alike." In the January–February 1995 issue of Paper Mayhem, Crystal Island ranked No. 47 of 77 PBM games with a score of 6.388 of 9 points.

== See also ==
- List of play-by-mail games

== Bibliography ==
- Editors (January–February 1995). "PBM Game Ratings: As of 11/18/94". Paper Mayhem. No. 70. pp. 44–45.
- Gorde, Chris (January–February 1992). "Crystal Island". Paper Mayhem. No. 52. pp. 29–32.
- Lloyd, Vickie (September–October 1992). "Crystal Island". Paper Mayhem. No. 61. pp. 29–30.
- Parbaek, Soren (November–December 1995). "Roleplay in the Mailbox". Paper Mayhem. No. 75. p. 27. Crystal Island review.
- Stone, Trey (July–August 1994). "Crystal Island: Game Within a Game". Flagship. No. 50. pp. 38–39.
