= Uncle Ugly's Underground =

Role-playing game supplement

Uncle Ugly's Underground is a 1978 role-playing game adventure for Tunnels & Trolls published by Flying Buffalo. It was written by Ugly John Carver. Although described on the cover as "The first level of a new complex of dungeon levels." to date only Level 1 has been released. The cover features an illustration of a dungeon door with the word "DOOM" on it; as described in the text these are actual letters on the door, and the word DOOM is not part of the adventure's title. A referee is required to play.

== Plot summary ==
Uncle Ugly's Underground is a dungeon located beneath an extinct volcano. The player characters explore a series of rooms in one level of a dungeon filled with traps and tricks.

== Reception ==
Forrest Johnson reviewed Uncle Ugly's Underground in The Space Gamer No. 28. Johnson commented that "The dungeon will in short order chew up a party of the usual invincible solo-dungeon grads. Mostly traps and trickery, some fiendishly clever, some merely fiendish. But look out for the trolls with the zoot suits and violin cases."
