= AmRest =

European restaurant operator

AmRest Holdings SE
- Type: Public
- Traded as: WSE: EAT; BMAD: EAT
- ISIN: ES0105375002
- Industry: Restaurants, Coffee shops
- Founded: 1993; 33 years ago
- Founder: Henry J. McGovern
- Headquarters: Madrid, Spain
- Number of locations: 2395
- Area served: Bulgaria; China; Croatia; Czech Republic; France; Germany; Hungary; Poland; Romania; Serbia; Slovakia; Slovenia; Spain; Switzerland
- Key people: José Parés Gutiérrez (chairman); Luis Comas (CEO); Eduardo Zamarripa (CFO)
- Brands: KFC; Pizza Hut; Burger King; Starbucks; La Tagliatella; Sushi Shop; Bacoa; Blue Frog; FoodAbout
- Revenue: ▲€1.546 billion (2018)
- Operating income: ▲€71.6 million (2018)
- Net income: ▼€41.3 million (2018)
- Number of employees: 49,000 (2018)
- Website: www.amrest.eu

AmRest Holdings SE is a European multinational casual dining, fast-food restaurant and coffee shop operator headquartered in the Spanish capital, Madrid. The company runs more than 2300 locations, mostly franchises of KFC, Pizza Hut and Starbucks, and also Burger King until 2022, but also operates its own brands of restaurants. Apart from Spain, AmRest operates in Bulgaria, China, Croatia, the Czech Republic, France, Germany, Hungary, Poland, Romania, Russia, Serbia, Slovakia, Slovenia, and others.

AmRest is listed on the Warsaw Stock Exchange since 2005 and Madrid Stock Exchange since 2018 with Mexican investor Carlos Fernández González as majority stakeholder.

== History ==
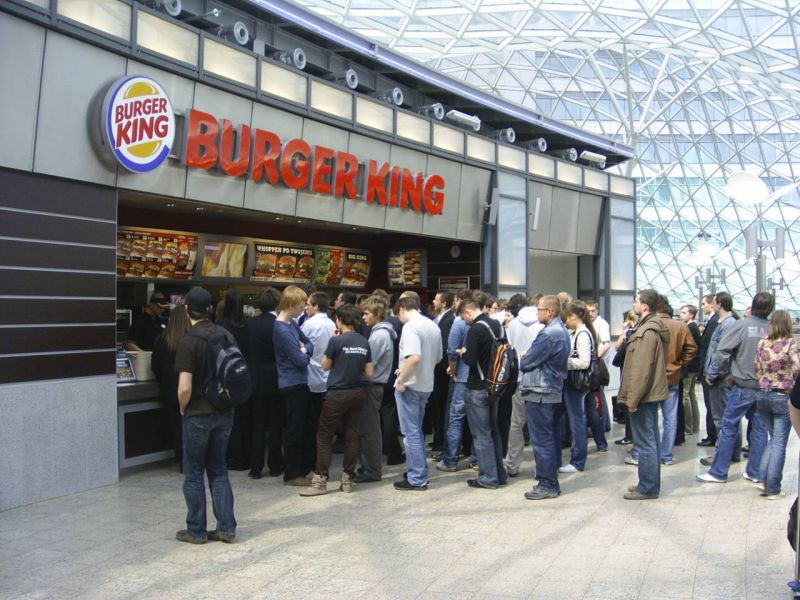
Burger King in Złote Tarasy, Warsaw

In 1993 Henry J. McGovern, Donald M. Kendall Sr., Donald M. Kendall Jr., and Christian R. Eisenbeiss established American Restaurants Services. Initially, the company held franchise rights to operate Pizza Hut and KFC restaurants in western Poland. In 1998, it expanded its operations outside Poland, by taking over KFC and Pizza Hut locations in the Czech Republic which were previously run by Yum! Brands.

In 2000, AmRest Holdings was formed as a joint venture company between American Restaurants and Yum! Brands, and in 2001 the new company took over International Fast Food Polska, the operator of the Burger King locations in Poland. Out of the 23 Burger King restaurants acquired, the Company closed 6 and rebranded the remaining 17 into KFC. In 2005, the company acquired the remaining franchise for Yum! concepts in the Czech Republic and Poland becoming the exclusive KFC and Pizza Hut franchisee in those countries. In 2006 AmRest bought the rights to seventeen KFC and Pizza Hut restaurants in Hungary and launched new Freshpoint and Rodeo Drive brands.

AmRest debuted on the stock market in April 2005 and Yum exited the company as a shareholder. In May 2005 AmRest acquired 8 Big Food restaurants in Czech Republic, and rebranded them into KFC.

In 2007 AmRest opened its first new Burger King restaurant in Poland, the first KFC restaurants in Serbia and Bulgaria and signed joint venture agreements with Starbucks about opening the coffee chain's stores in Poland, the Czech Republic and Hungary. In 2008 company signed agreements about opening Burger King in Bulgaria and acquired several restaurants in Russia. In January 2008 AmRest opened first Starbucks store in Prague. The company opened its first Starbucks location in Poland in 2008.

In May 2008, AmRest acquired 80% shares in Apple Grove Holding, the second biggest Applebee's franchisee in the United States.

In April 2010, Warburg Pincus, a premier private equity firm, offered to invest over 300 million pln for a 24.99% shareholding in AmRest. In 2010, AmRest also opened the first Starbucks in Hungary.

In April 2011 AmRest announced the acquisition of Spanish company Restauravia, operating 30 KFC's and over 120 Italian Casual Dining restaurants La Tagliatella. La Tagliatella was announced to be one of the main drivers of AmRest's global expansion. But the result of AmRest's attempts since 2012 for developing La Tagliatella chain of restaurants outside Spain was without success. Locations opened in China, India and the United States closed quickly. The subsidiary in France, which operates the group's five restaurants, generated a loss of 2.9 million euros in 2017, a total of 11.7 million euros since 2012.

AmRest LLC, which operated 102 Applebee's restaurants in the United States was sold to American Apple Group, the largest franchisee of Applebee's on June 7, 2012.

On December 14, 2012, AmRest acquired Blue Frog and Kabba restaurant brands in China.

AmRest has increased the number of countries in which it operates Starbucks after acquiring the coffee shops operated by Greek Marinopoulos Coffee in Romania and Bulgaria in March 2015. In April 2016, AmRest also bought 144 Starbucks coffee shops in Germany for 41 million euros.

In 2017, the company moved its headquarters from Poland to Madrid, Spain.

AmRest acquired the Sushi Shop restaurant chain in France in July 2018. Burger King returned to Slovakia after AmRest opened a restaurant in November 2018.

In April 2019, AmRest opened the first Starbucks cafe in Serbia. It also returned Burger King in Romania by opening first restaurants in Bucharest, after 7 years break, in which only the airport location was operated.

On February 1, 2022, Burger King terminated its franchising contract with AmRest, which means no new Burger King restaurants would be opened in Poland, Czech Republic, Slovakia, Romania and Bulgaria but in Romania, Poland and Czech Republic, they will open new restaurants with Rex Concepts CEE (McWin). In March 2022, Amrest suspended its operations in Russia due to the 2022 Russian invasion of Ukraine; in 2023, the company sold its Russia-based KFC business to Russian franchise holder Smart Service for at least 100 million euros.

== See also ==
- List of hamburger restaurants
