= Gamesmen of Kasar =

Gamesmen of Kasar is a 1982 role-playing game adventure for Tunnels & Trolls published by Flying Buffalo.

== Plot summary ==
Gamesmen of Kasar is a solo adventure in which a merchant from outside of Kasar has purchased a building in that city, and messengers soon challenge anyone to risk their lives in a game for the prize of riches and fame.

Gamesmen of Kasar is the 17th solo scenario, and is intended for any character that has up to 110 adds by the game system, in which the Gamemasters of Kasar present wealth to anyone that can win their game.

== Publication history ==
Gamesmen of Kasar was written by Roy Cram, with a cover by James Talbot and illustrations by Douglas Herring, and was published by Blade/Flying Buffalo in 1982 as a 40-page book, and published by Chris Harvey (U.K.) in 1983.

== Reception ==
William Peschel reviewed Gamesmen of Kasar in The Space Gamer No. 62. Peschel commented that "The physical quality of the solo is excellent and up to Flying Buffalo standards. But in writing Gamesmen, Cram forgot to include anything to challenge the intellect of the player."
