= Element Fresh =

Restaurant chain in China

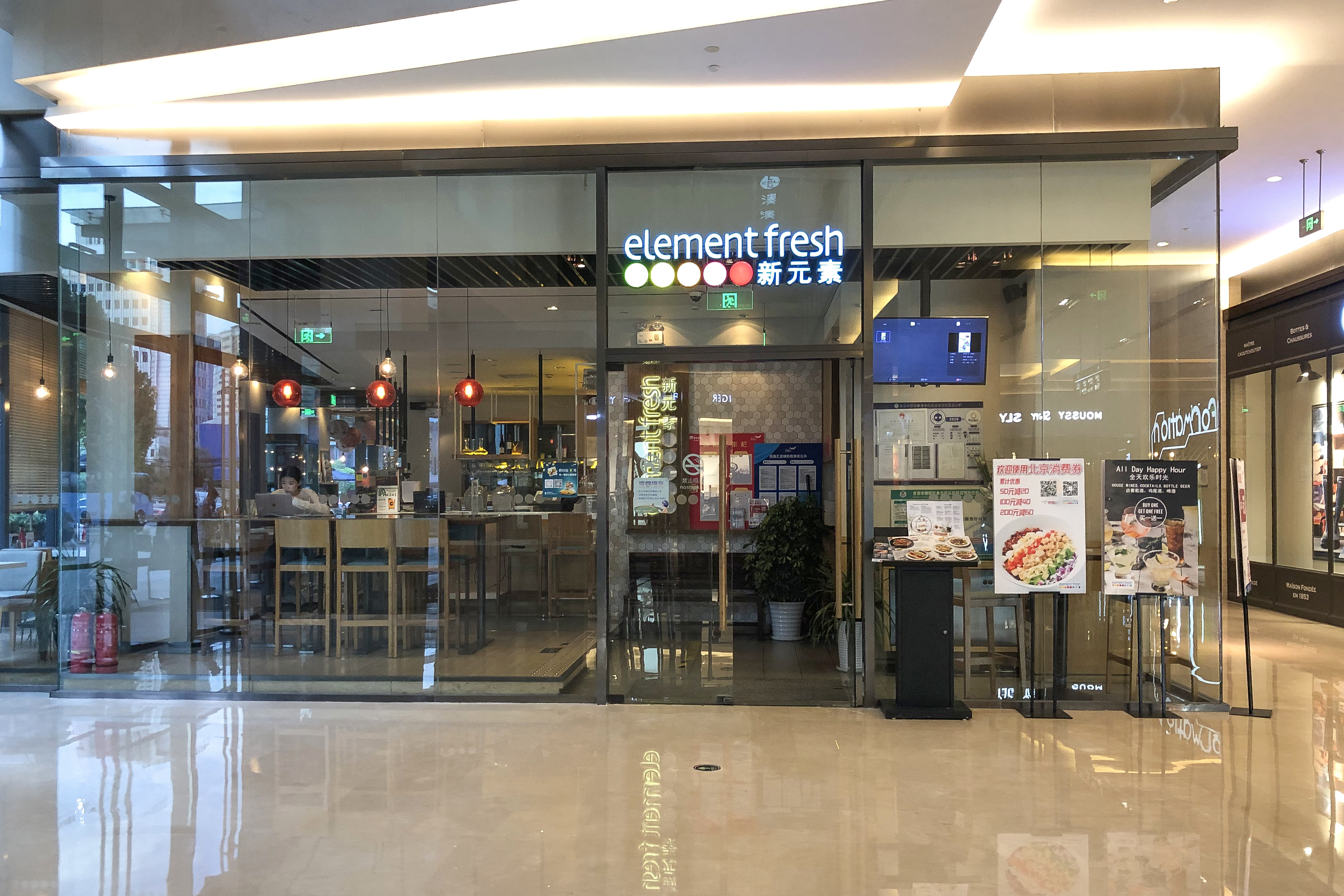
An Element Fresh location in Beijing

New Elements Food & Beverage Management or Elementfresh Inc, doing business as Element Fresh (Chinese: 新元素; pinyin: Xīn Yuánsù; lit. 'New Element'), was a chain of restaurants in China focusing on Western cuisine. The company headquarters were in Jing'an District, Shanghai.

Shanghai Centre in Shanghai housed its flagship restaurant.

== History ==
In 2001 the chain was established by two people from the United States, Scott Minoie and Sheldon Habiger. It was located in a Gold's Gym, and it served as a juice bar. It served as a shop for foods for people looking for healthy options. The initial customer base was employees at Shanghai Centre.

The company purposely catered to an expatriate market as a way of also assuring Chinese customers that its food was authentic to the Western world. In 2016 the company had locations in seven cities in China. These restaurants totaled 28.

For a period of time, the company's business operations returned profits. The COVID-19 pandemic in China ended this streak.

Its business was scheduled to end on January 1, 2022.

== See also ==
- Blue Frog
- Wagas
