= The DragonCrown War Cycle =

Fantasy book series by Michael A. Stackpole

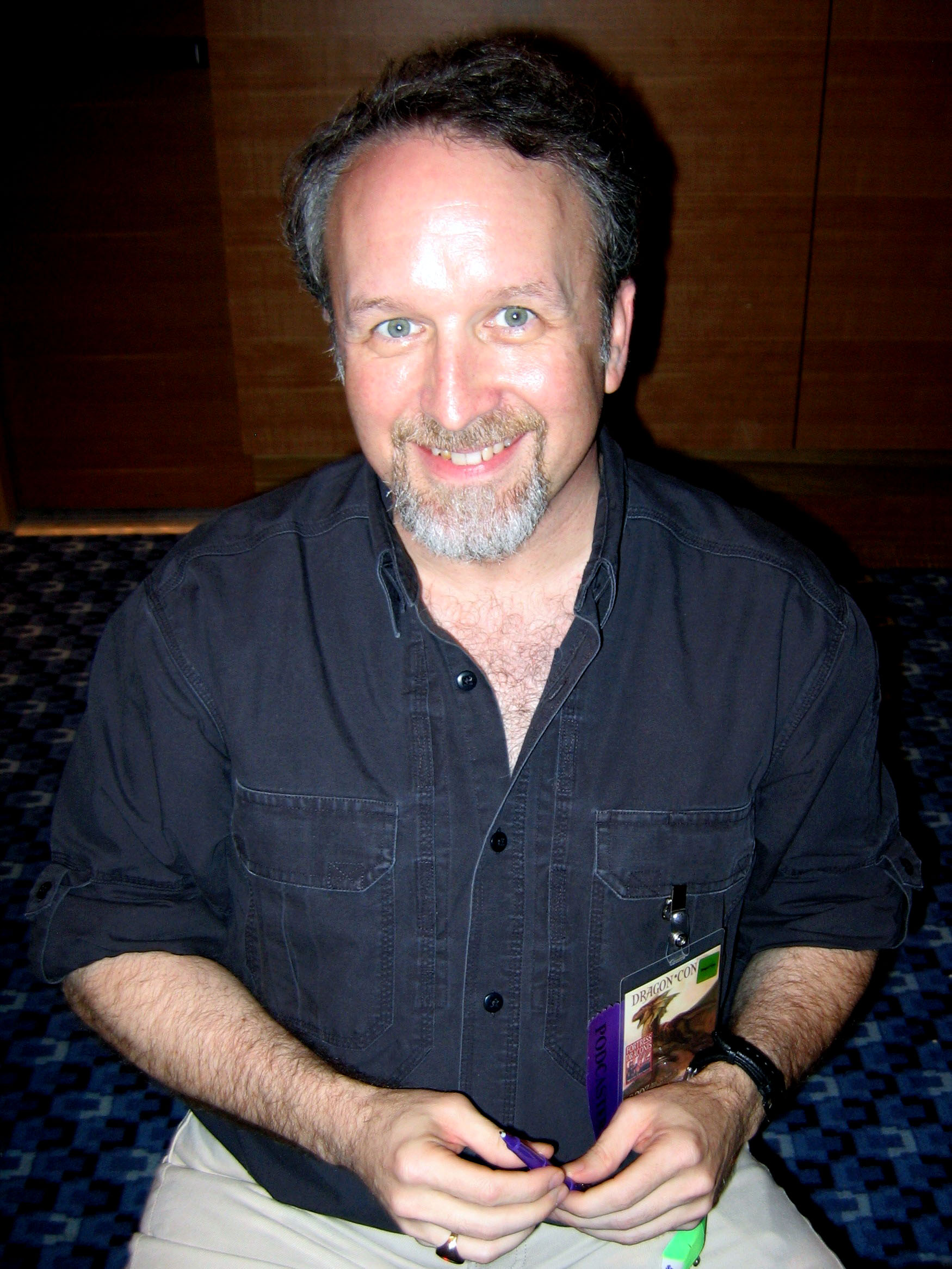
- Michael A Stackpole at Dragon Con 2007
- Volumes: The Dark Glory War; Fortress Draconis; When Dragons Rage; The Grand Crusade
- Author: Michael A. Stackpole
- Country: United States
- Language: English
- Genre: High fantasy; Adventure
- Publisher: Bantam Spectra (US)
- Published: 2000; 2001; 2002; 2003
- Media type: Print (paperback)

The DragonCrown War Cycle is a four book fantasy series consisting of a prequel, The Dark Glory War, and three main volumes, Fortress Draconis, When Dragons Rage, and The Grand Crusade. The books were written by Michael A. Stackpole and published by Bantam Spectra, a subsidiary of Randomhouse inc. over the course of 4 years from 2000-2003. The books follow a group of heroes as they struggle to bring to fruition the Norrington Prophecy, so that they can defeat the evil Queen of the north, Chytrine, and save the southern kingdoms from destruction.

== The Norrington Prophecy ==
The words of the prophecy are printed in every book on the pages before the story starts.

A Norrington to lead them,
Immortal, washed in fire
Victorious, from sea to ice

Power of the north he will shatter,
A scourge he will kill,
Then Vorquellyn he will redeem.

== The Dragon Crown ==
The Dragon Crown is a magical artifact of great power. In ages long past, the powerful sorcerer Kirun created the crown using Dragon Heartstones gifted to him by the Dragon Council. Each Stone held the soul of an old and powerful dragon. Drawing from their strength, Kirun wove spells and created a crown that allowed the wearer, if they are powerful enough, to bend Dragons to their will. However, after Kirun's defeat the pieces were separated and hidden. Chytrine has been trying to recover the crown fragments while the people of the southern kingdoms fight to protect them because if Chytrine could wield the power of the crown, none could stand before her.

== Book Summaries ==
=== The Dark Glory War ===
It is Moon Month in Oriosa, the month where boys participate in the joyous festivals of becoming men. Three childhood friends Leigh Norrington, Tarrant Hawkins, and Rounce Playfair are joined by a newcomer Naysmith Carver as they are sent out into the forest to prove themselves worthy of earning their adult masks to replace their recently received moonmasks. In Oriosa, a person without a mask has no identity and is a shame to his family. While out in the forest their hidden guide is killed and the boys must fight a monstrous temeryx. They succeed in killing the monster but Rounce is severely hurt and cannot continue in their adventures. The boys return to their town to inform Leigh's father, Lord Norrington, of their encounter. Norrington realizing that the arrival of the temeryx from the north means the evil Queen Chytrine of Aurolan was renewing her effort to conquer the world. Norrington, the boys, and Norrington's soldiers set out to tell the Queen of Oriosa their discovery. From there they join forces with the Queen's armies and set out to fight the Aurolan armies of Gibberers and temeryxes. They fight various roving armies as they are en route to the besieged Fortress Draconis, the gateway to the north. During the trip the young heroes are awarded their adult masks by Lord Norrington. In these battles they are greatly aided by a magical sword Temmer discovered by Leigh Norrington. Temmer makes the user invincible in battle but will eventually cause the wielder to lose his sanity. When Leigh discovers the sword he also discovers a prophecy that seems to suggest he will be the one to destroy Chytrine once and for all. When the heroes reach Fortress Draconis their armies help win the battle. However, the main heroes believing themselves invincible with prophecy leave their armies to orchestrate a sneak attack against Chytrine in her own territory. Unfortunately, the heroes are defeated by Chytrine with some dying and others giving up and being magically corrupted into becoming Chytrine's new sullanciri(Dark Lancers). They ironically replace her old generals whom they had killed earlier in their adventures. The only one to escape is Tarrant Hawkins but he does not believe that he escaped truly alive. He is stripped of his adult mask by his father upon returning to Yslin. The Crown heads don't want him spreading word of Chytrine's promise to return. Without his mask, he is without his identity so Tarrant Hawkins dies and becomes Kedyn's Crow.

=== Fortress Draconis ===
Will is a thief in the slums of the once great city of Yslin. He usually sticks to small thefts but today he has something big planned. Something that will force his landlord and mentor, Marcus, from kicking him out of the thief's den. He waits all night for the Vorquelf, Predator, to go to sleep. Will sneaks in the house and steals what to him is just a metallic leaf. He does not know its true purpose but suddenly feels as if he was destined to have it. Unfortunately, he lingers too long and Predator becomes aware of his presence. Predator and his band of Vorqs chase Will until they are intercepted by a Vorq even bigger than Predator. Resolute beats down the Vorqs with the help of an older man named Crow. After their rescue they take Will to a tavern to get him washed up and to spread false tales of their plans. Now taking a bewildered Will with them, Resolute and Crow leave the city and head into the countryside. They pass through a town called Stellin that should be peaceful but is on edge because of recent gibberer incursions. They pass through quickly, heading towards the mountains. There they meet the Oracle, a Vorq with the power to see the future, among other things. Using Will's blood and her magic, she manages to summon a Sullanciri into her cave. While some minor damage is caused trying to get the Dark Lancer to leave, his presence confirms that Will is, at least, strongly connected to the person Resolute and Crow have been looking for. After this encounter the group heads back towards Stellin and finds it ready for a battle. The group help the town set up better defenses and drops off a girl named Sephi they had saved in the woods. The group hides in the stables waiting for the gibberers. They kill many but would have been overrun if not for the arrival of Princess Alyx and her golden bandits. The group sneaks away while the bandits finish the battle.

From the town Will, Resolute, and Crow head towards a city to find boat passage to Fortress Draconis. Alyx on the other hand heads to a different city that is being overrun by Aurolani forces. She stages a brilliant plan and saves the city only to have it be destroyed a few days later by a dragon Chytrine has gained control of with a piece of the legendary DragonCrown. After The victory she is taken to Yslin by King Augustus in order to help him influence the Okrannel refugees in the city during the Harvest festival. Meanwhile on the way towards the sea our heroes encounter and save a man named Dranae who towers above even Resolute. With him in tow they reach the desired city only to be press ganged into serving on a ship headed to protect the island of Vilwan where the strongest mages of the era live and train. They get there just in time to help set up the defenses. The battle seems destined to be a Vilwaneese victory until Chytrine's dragon appears. Luckily another dragon materializes, wounds the golden dragon, destroys the pirates' flagship and flies away carrying its younger brethren in its massive claws. Without the dragon the mages easily win but at great cost. Many of the young apprentices evacuated before the battle were sought after and killed by the pirates. Luckily for the world, a young Adept named Kerrigan Reese survived his time on the high sea. He is the most powerful mage in a generation granted powers that a human hasn't possessed in centuries. However he is just a boy and his isolation in Vilwan has made him soft. After the battle Will and company find themselves taken to the Harvest Festival. Kerrigan also finds his way there after being rescued from the sea by his tutor Orla and a Panqui named Lombo. Once there Will learns he is the Norrington from the prophecy and runs away. While people search for him, all the kings and queens at the festival meet to discuss their plans. One side wishes to reinforce Fortress Draconis and remove the pieces of the DragonCrown hidden there. Another faction wishes to free Okrannel before sweeping into Aurolani.

Eventually the Okrannel side wins out over the more reasonable plan. Will is found and sent with the Okrannel army featuring Princess Alexia as one of its generals. Kerrigan also joins the troops as Will's protector from magical attacks. The Baron Draconis leaves angrily and with less reinforcements than he wanted. During the expedition into Okrannel the army manages to free the once important city of Svoid but find it is not worth protecting and burn it. However, Alexia learns that a thief has stolen a piece of the DragonCrown and given it to a pirate Queen. The main group of heroes leaves the battlefront in the capable hands of General Adrogans in order to retrieve it. They infiltrate a pirate city and take back the crown though in the process Orla dies. From there they decide to head to Fortress Draconis to try to save other pieces of the DragonCrown. They succeed in saving one more piece thanks to Kerrigan's magic and the massive number of soldiers who gave their lives defending the Fortress. Chytrine wins out in the end with the help of her dragon and takes hold of the Fortress and the two other pieces of the Crown left there. Luckily a force of the fortresses' men stays behind and will continue to harass her armies until they die or the southern armies liberate them. The main cast of heroes is stopped on the road as they lead the refugees back towards the south. Crow is arrested as it is revealed to the rest of the group that he is in fact Tarrant Hawkins, who most people believed caused the failure of the original Norrington quest.

=== When Dragons Rage ===
Will, Resolute, Alyx, Kerrigan and their allies are being led by Orosian soldiers towards the capital city of Meredo. On the way they discuss plans for freeing Crow from his imprisonment. Will wants to take a direct approach but Alyx discovers another way after a secret meeting in her dreams with the black dragon. The Black Dragon is a member of secret society that Alyx was inducted to during the events of the last book. She secretly marries Crow giving him all the rights a royal consort would be given. Upon arrival in Meredo she spars verbally with King Scrainwood and achieves her goal of getting Crow a fair trial. Meanwhile Will and Kerrigan make preparations to hide the piece of the DragonCrown they rescued. Kerrigan is summoned by a Magister to the Vilwan consulate but using his new found confidence and experience he refuses calmly and effectively. Later he is summoned by the Grand Magister and decides to go. In the northern lands of Aurolan, Chytrine begins to prepare her adopted daughter for a trip south as her agent. Chytrine also creates another Sullanciri out of what used to be the renowned thief the Azure Spire to send south with her daughter.

Keydn's trial begins with Will assuming the role of Lord Norrington in order to plead Crow's case. However, the sullanciri that was once Lord Norrington appears and citing many laws of Oriosa is allowed to speak. He acquits Tarrant of many of his supposed crimes but still accuses him of treason because he would not kill Lord Norrington before he could become a sullanciri. Another setback occurs when Kerrigan is abducted by an unknown person as he was trying to attend his summons. He awakes in a cell and begins to use magic but every time he does an entity breaks his concentration until he lights a fire with just a rock and his manacles. Someone was testing to see if Kerrigan could actually save the world. Will had bolted from the courtroom when the sullanciri was allowed to speak. He suddenly realizes it is a distraction and runs to his room to try to protect his piece of the dragoncrown. When he arrives he finds the new Azure Spider trapped in Kerrigan's protective spells. Will is relieved until the Spider sprays Will with venom who begins to feel paralysis set in.

When Scrainwood finds out he demands the crown piece. King Augustus gives it to him and receives promises of help in the future. Isaura while exploring Meredo finds Will and helps to save him not knowing who he is. She thinks upon this idea as she is taken back to her homeland and wonders why she did what she did. Was this a betrayal of her mother? Kerrigan also finds out that his captor is a very powerful mage who has an urZethru as a companion. He decides Kerrigan is not a threat to the world and promises to help him.

As Crow is being freed a Princess from another nation storms in to the chambers to claim Will as her country's champion. However, Scrainwood enters and reveals that there is another possible Norrington. Will however eventually is chosen as the true Norrington over his half-brother Kensleigh. Will also falls in love with the younger princess, Saynce, from Murosa. While these political battles take place, the heroes receive word of another invasion by Aurolani forces and set off to battle it. Before they leave Will and Saynce make love.

Kerrigan and his new tutor also travel towards the fight trying to prepare magics that will help the battle and recruit the dragons to their cause. They discover during the battle that they had one already. As an enemy dragon joins the fray, Dranae remembers that he is actually a Dragon when the younger dragon's fire burns off the spell that bound him. Dranae returns to Dragon form, chases off the Aurolan army and then takes a select few of his companions into a major dragon haunt as ambassadors. In another battle in Okrannel Kerrigan and Alexia encounter another Dragon which offers to save them and the city they defend if he may take Kerrigan. They agree and after he wins the day for them he also brings them to Dragonholm. There Will gets in a debate with the sullanciri version of his father as they both try to recruit the race of Dragons to their sides. The sullanciri steals Kerrigan's master's heart because he is actually a dragon placed in a magical puppet. As it seems the debate is going against him the sullanciri throws the heart towards the lava pits. Without thinking Will leaps and saves the heartstone but ends up falling into the lava himself. The Dragons decide to remain neutral because both sides had broken the etiquette rules of Dragon congress. The rest of the heroes speculate on how the world will react to the news of Will's death.

=== The Grand Crusade ===
Chytrine appears in King Scrainwood's throne room to inform him of the Norrington's death. She then tells him that she is going to make him a sullanciri whether he accepts it or not. He accepts the change. When Crow, Alyx, and Resolute return to the council of kings they inform the rest of the kings of Will's death and the fact that they have the support of a few Dragons but not all. Quickly, political battles begin with the kings creating a compromise that forces King Fidelius of Saprocia to allow other nations' troops to cross his border. Also, the Queen of Jerana sends a request to General Adrogan inquiring about his possession of Dragonell cannons. He decides to play his own game with the manner he responds to the request knowing no one should have Dragonells. Alyx and Crow whose sham wedding had grown into real love are visited by Crow's old friends, Rounce and Naysmith. They had created 4 new magical swords, each with a piece of Temmer placed inside of it. Alyx and Crow each choose, or are chosen by, a sword.

Kerrigan while being taught by the urZethri Bok and the Dragon Rym learns that Chytrine was the daughter of a female dragon and Bok while both were in human form. Chytrine became Kirun's apprentice because he thought she could heal the rift between dragons and urZethri. Kerrigan creates a spell to track Chytrine based on the information and tracks her to the encampment of the multi national army raised in Narriz (due to, in no small part, Resolute's passionate speech). Kerrigan bursts into the command tent where the selected leader of the army, Alexia, was conferring with king Augustus and her aunt Grand Duchess Tatyana who Kerrigan reveals to be Chytrine. She blasts Kerrigan, hurts Bok and escapes with Nefrai-Kesh (Lord Norrington turned sullanciri). They also take Saynce who they realize is carrying Will's son. They then slay Nefrai-Laysh (Leigh Norrington turned sullanciri).

As the army sets out from Narriz, General Adrogan also begins his assault on the ghost marshes. Alexia, Resolute, Kerrigan and Crow learn from the oracle that Will may have survived and been magically trapped on Vorquellyn because of dragon blood within him. Chytrine also knows this and sets a trap during a meeting with her sullanciri generals. After leaving the meeting Isaura meets Saynce and talks to her about the south, saving Will and Chytrine. Isaura also has the sullanciri version of Lombo, Hullcri, as her bodyguard. Alyx's army realizes, thanks to Kerrigan, that someone has stolen the DragonCrown piece hidden in Orosio who has the Vorquellyn Crown piece as well. General Adrogan, and General Caro lead their army through the boreal pass, their clever strategies making up for their manpower deficiencies.

Alyx's army pursues the crown pieces fighting the Aurolani invaders as she does. However, Alyx, and Crow are ambushed in their tent by a sullanciri who poisons Crow. Alyx retreats into her mind to call for help from the Black Dragon in the ether realm chamber of her secret society. The black dragon appears, saves them both and reveals himself to be Alyx's dead father. His esscence quickly retreats back to the other realm leaving just his mechanical assistant who turns out to have a crown fragment inside of him. Kerrigan and Resolute split from the main group with Dranae to track the two crown fragments Kerrigan has felt. It leads them to an old Vorqelf who has been protecting the Vorq fragment for centuries. That Vorq then helps them reach the place on Vorquellyn they need to go. While there they free Will and defeat the Sullanciri left behind to surprise them. Also during this time, Isaura turns against her mother, realizing she is evil like the Oromise who guide her, and helps free Saynce and then head to find the newly freed Will. Alexia's army defeats the Aurolani forces in the south and moves into Aurolan to face Nefrai-Kesh. On the other side of the continent, Adrogan steadily advances into Aurolan, destroying armies and a huge ship building project.

The Will that has returned is not the same; much of his personality seeming to be lost. With each passing day he becomes less of himself. Resolute, Kerrigan, and Force (Will's new name, taking the other part of his full name Wilburforce) meet up with Sayce, and Isuara learning that Isuara is Tarrant's daughter with a Vorq that had become a sullanciri. Adrogan draws near the Aurolan palace around the same time as Alexia. They each fight an army headed by a sullanciri. As this occurs, Force is being smuggled into the Aurolani palace where he and his companions fight Chytrine and her servants. Chytrine becomes a dragon and destroys Force. She then begins to toy with Resolute and the rest but Resolute resists, rediscovering his true self. Suddenly, Chytrine begins to cough. Force's body rebuilds itself from the dust in the air and inside Chytrine's body. With her death the Sullanciri weaken and Earlstroke of Orosia slays Ferrexigo allowing General Adrogan to win the day. On the other side of the battle, Crow finally does what Lord Norrington has asked for long ago and kills Nefrai-Lesh. An old dragon appears, to fly Resolute and the rest of his group south to meet Alexia.

He then takes Resolute to Orosia, to where Resolute killed Scrainwood whom he had guessed was a sullanciri. Rym and Kerrigan go to Vilwan to tell the Mages that their monopoly on power is over and their alliance with a sullanciri and attempts to control the norrington bloodline were crimes that would be divulged. The magisters laugh, saying that Kerrigan doesn't have enough power to defeat them all. Smartly, Rym, having retrieved his dragon body, changes into dragon form in order to defeat the magisters. King Erlestroke having replaced his father helps secure the continued freedom of Murosa and Sebcia. However at the kings meeting it is decided not to destroy the dragoncrown and return their truestones to their waiting bodies mainly because few trust Kerrigan after him taking over Vilwan. Also many Kings and Queens fantasize about it eventually being theirs. So the Crown pieces are once again separated and hidden. Later on Vorquellyn, Magic created by Kerrigan and Isuara channeled through Force eliminates Chytrine's corruption of the elf homeland. Resolute however is rejected by Vorquellyn. At first he is devastated but an elf mage suggests that Vorquellyn did not accept him because Resolute is destined to create a new elf homeland. If one could be created then Elves would not have to eventually leave the world. Will leaves Vorquellyn to wander the north ensuring Chytrine's evil can never return. Tarrant, in a letter to his sons with Alexia who are just born, promises that they will hear many tales of the age before their birth but hopes they never have to live through the same kind of life he had. He also promises that, eventually, he will take them to the north when they are of age, to meet him who sacrificed himself. A boy who was never able to grow old and have the life he desired. Instead, he sacrificed himself and became a myth. A stone man that stalks the north ensuring peace for the south.

== Characters ==
- Will - A street-smart, orphaned thief with a penchant for rhymes from the city of Yslin who knows little of the world or his destiny. Luckily, he is a quick learner.
- Alexia - A princess of a dead nation, raised among the winged people of Gyrkhyme, who excels at everything she does.
- Kerrigan - A boy who has been granted enormous magical powers whether he is ready for them or not. Years of study make him adept in the classroom but useless in the real world.
- Keydn's Crow - A grizzled old warrior that has dedicated his life to the renewal of Vorquellyn and the destruction of Chytrine
- Resolute - A Vorquelf that comes off as mean-spirited, and gruff because of his single-minded quest to restore his homeland. He sees everyone as either useful to his goal or an obstacle.
- Chytrine - The evil Queen of Aurolan, who is hellbent on conquering the lands to the south. She has immense magical powers and is only kept at bay by the combined efforts of the southern kingdoms.
- Oracle - A Vorquelf with the power of foresight. She keeps watch over the trove of relics rescued from Vorquellyn before its corruption. However, she can no longer see the present because she blinded herself to prevent others from using her eyes.

== Other information ==
The second book of the series, Fortress Draconis, was one of the featured books for the year 2001 during Spectra's 25 Years of Spectra celebration which occurred in 2010. When he was interviewed for the event Stackpole stated that “Fortress Draconis was a first novel in several ways. It was my first trade paperback, which was a great thrill." Also in regards to the planning stages of the DragonCrown War Cycle he stated the he'd "originally looked at just doing the trilogy" but he added The Dark Glory War after a discussion with Anne Groell and Tom Dupree. He decided he "had back-story, so might as well burn it in a novel we could use as a lead-in."

Each of the books had a brief excerpt from the next book after the "About the Author" section except for the final book, The Grand Crusade. Instead, that book had an excerpt from the first book, The Secret Atlas, of Stackpole's next series, the Age of Discovery. The Secret Atlas was also featured during the 25 years of Spectra celebration for the year 2005.
