= Wagas (restaurant) =

Restaurant chain in China

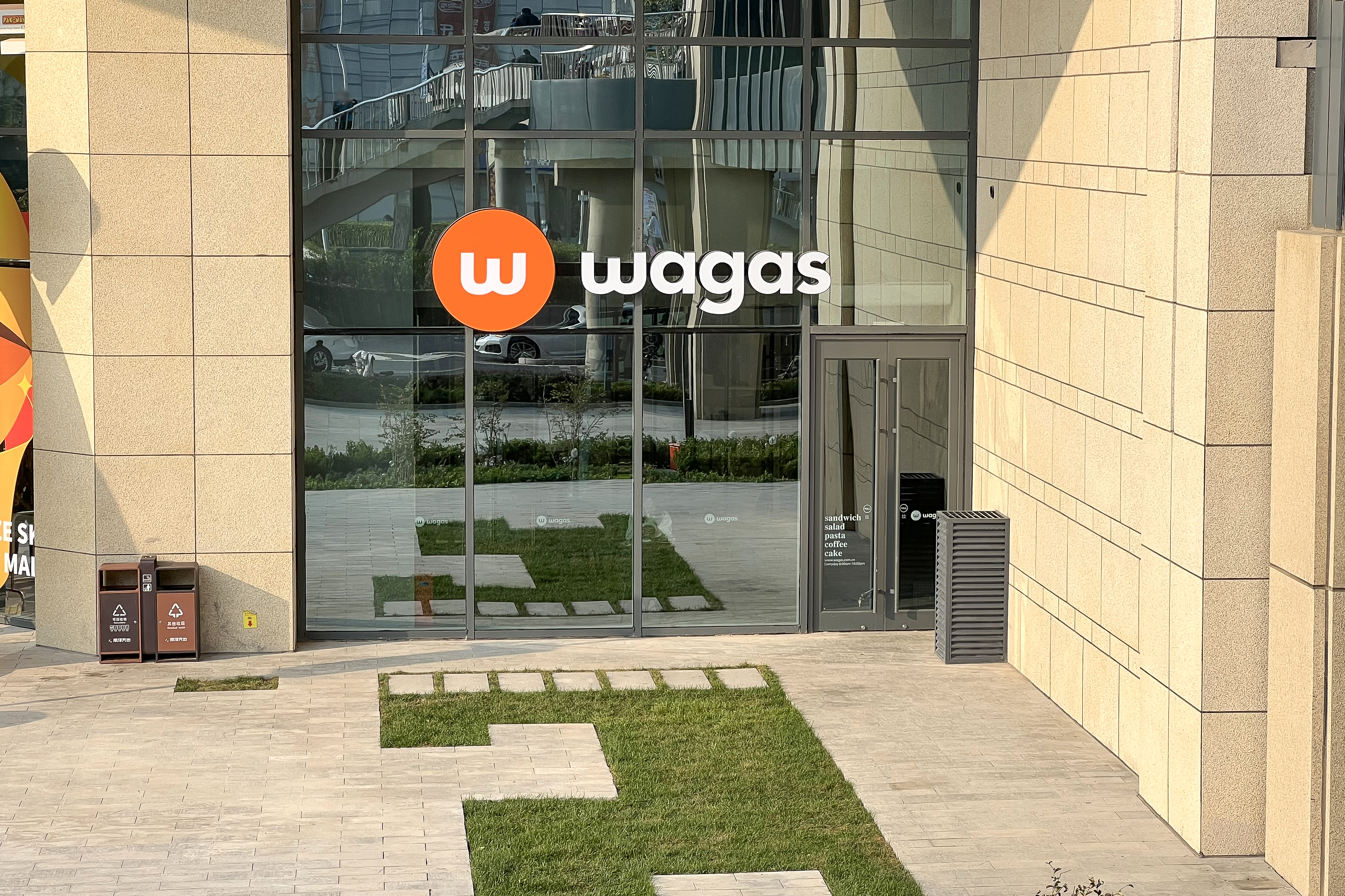
A wagas restaurant at Lize Sky Mall, Fengtai District, Beijing, China

Wagas (Chinese: 沃歌斯; pinyin: Wògēsī) is a Western cuisine restaurant chain in China, headquartered in Jing'an District, Shanghai.

In 2022, it had 250 restaurants.

== History ==
Originating in Shanghai, it began operations in 1999, established by John Christensen from Denmark. His business partner was an Australian named Jackie Yun.

The company began a bakery chain called Baker & Spice in 2010.

Wagas, by 2016, opened its first Shenzhen location.

In 2021 various investing groups showed interest in purchasing the company. Jollibee, Restaurant Brands International, and Yum China considered acquiring Wagas. In February 2022 Advent International had made moves towards acquiring Wagas. In September 2022 Advent acquired 60%, a controlling stake, in Wagas.

== See also ==
- Blue Frog
- Element Fresh
