= Mistywood =

Tabletop role-playing game supplement

Mistywood is a 1981 role-playing game adventure for Tunnels & Trolls published by Flying Buffalo.

== Plot summary ==
Mistywood is a solo dungeon adventure for a single humanoid character that takes place in a town on the border of the Mistywood.

== Reception ==
W.G. Armintrout reviewed Mistywood in The Space Gamer No. 52. Armintrout commented that "I had a very good time with Mistywood. It you like T&T lethality, and if you stick to characters with at least 65 combat adds, I recommend it."
