= Starfaring =

- Cover art by Ernest Hogan
- Designers: Ken St. Andre
- Publishers: Flying Buffalo
- Publication: 1976
- Genres: Science fiction
- Systems: Custom

Starfaring was the first science fiction role-playing game (RPG) published, released by Flying Buffalo in August 1976. (Note: Several sources call Metamorphosis Alpha the first science fiction role-playing game, others Starfaring. The Catalog of Copyright Entries. Third Series 1976: July–December, p. 2992 put the publication date of Metamorphosis Alpha at November 1976, p. 3051 puts Starfaring to August 1976, i.e. months earlier.) Although it was the first to market, it didn't attract an audience, and was soon superseded by the much more popular Traveller published the following year.

== Description ==
Starfaring is a two-player science fiction RPG "loosely based on Star Trek" that is set 700 years in the future, after humanity wins a war against robots. The world government loans money to adventurers so they can buy a small spacecraft and travel through a nearby stargate to explore space. The book includes information on:

- creating scenarios
- building ships
- creating crews and characters
- weapons and conflict
- rewards
- stores
- psionic powers
- hazards
- random star locations, star types, star systems, and planetary types
- life among the stars

=== Gameplay ===
Two people are required for play:

1. The gamemaster designs adventures, and then runs them.
2. The player creates a ship and its crew. Unusually, the ship, not the crew, becomes the primary player character.

=== Shipbuilding ===
Ships have the following attributes: Size, Warp Drive, Brahma Crystal Power Supply, Shiva Crystal Weapons System, Vishnu Crystal Shields, and Instrumentation Computers.

=== Character creation ===
Character creation uses random rolls of three six-sided dice to generate Mentality, Psi, Physique, and Health.

== Publication history ==
As game historian Erdei Jacint noted, following the successful launch of the first fantasy RPG, Dungeons & Dragons in 1974, "many small companies started producing fantasy RPGs, hoping to get rich. Clones rapidly appeared." Game designer Ken St. Andre was part of that movement, quickly designing several fantasy RPGs and supplements, including Tunnels & Trolls (published by Flying Buffalo) and Monsters! Monsters! (published by Metagaming Concepts). But as Jacint noted, "Due to the enormous amount of games with similar themes, the market started to stagnate. The time had come for a change. St. Andre took the first step in this direction." St. Andre decided to move away from fantasy and created a science fiction RPG titled Starfaring, which was published by Flying Buffalo in August 1976. As game historians Shannon Appelcline, Lawrence Schick, and Pascal Martinolli noted, it was the first science fiction RPG on the market, appearing several months before the publication of TSR's science fiction RPG Metamorphosis Alpha.

The first printing of Starfaring in 1976 was an 80-page saddle-stapled mimeographed softcover book with a black & white illustration by Ernest Hogan on the cover. More artwork by Hogan appeared in the book. A second printing that same year had a black spiral binding. The book did not make much of an impact on the market. In a player poll of 28 RPGs in the October–November 1976 issue of The Space Gamer, Starfaring received the lowest rating. As Lawrence Schick explained, "Starfaring shared [Tunnels & Trolls]'s loose and whimsical approach. Unfortunately, looseness is not a valuable commodity in SF games — to be credible, the technology and how it affects society must be clearly explained."

In 1977, Game Designer's Workshop released another science fiction RPG, Traveller, featuring professional typesetting, illustrations, and graphic design. It quickly proved to be far more popular than Starfaring. In a 1980 international listing of several hundred gamemasters and gaming groups that appeared in Issue 33 of Dragon, over one hundred identified that they played Traveller. In contrast, only two played Starfaring.

In 2007, Outlaw Press published a revised and expanded second edition of Starfaring packaged as a 76-page digest-sized book. Ernest Hogan's original cover art was used, this time in full color.
