= The Toughest Dungeon in the World =

Tabletop role-playing game adventure

The Toughest Dungeon in the World is a 1980 role-playing game solo adventure for Tunnels & Trolls.

== Plot summary ==
The Toughest Dungeon in the World is an adventure in which the player character is a troll searching the dungeon trying to build up a treasure hoard.

== Publication history ==
The Toughest Dungeon in the World was written by Ken St. Andre and was the first adventure for Tunnels & Trolls published by Judges Guild.

In 2020, St. Andre, with art by Steve Crompton and Phil Longmeier, updated and expanded the adventure to create a 48-page second edition named Toughest Dungeon in the World. Its release coincided with the second edition of Monsters! Monsters! and was first published by Trollhalla Press Unlimited.

== Reception ==
Forrest Johnson reviewed The Toughest Dungeon in the World in The Space Gamer No. 35. Johnson commented that "Do you enjoy rolling dice for hours on end, even knowing the probability of a favorable outcome is very slight? [...] If you have better things to do with your time [...] there are plenty of other games on the market."

Anders Swenson reviewed The Toughest Dungeon in the World for Different Worlds magazine and stated that "In evaluation, this is a well done adventure with a crazy theme that everybody should try. Pity the poor troll, cowering in the dank depths, trying to get a small fortune together so he can escape to the outside world, free from the clutches of dungeon existance [sic]! It may make you want to take a troll to lunch."
