= Deathtrap Equalizer Dungeon =

1977 gamebook

Deathtrap Equalizer Dungeon is a 1977 gamebook published by Flying Buffalo.

== Gameplay ==
Deathtrap Equalizer Dungeon is a dungeon adventure for a single player character of any character class.

== Publication history ==
Deathtrap Equalizer Dungeon is the second book in the series after Buffalo Castle. Ken St. Andre wrote Deathtrap Equalizer Dungeon in February 1976. St. Andre wrote the gamebooks Deathtrap Equalizer Dungeon and Naked Doom which were published in 1977 after Rick Loomis's own Buffalo Castle.

== Reception ==
Steve Jackson reviewed Deathtrap Equalizer Dungeon in The Space Gamer No. 11. Jackson concluded that "On the whole, it's a lot of fun. Generally witty too".
