= Blue Frog Tavern =

Role-playing game supplement

Blue Frog Tavern is a 1981 role-playing game adventure for Tunnels & Trolls published by Flying Buffalo.

== Plot summary ==
Blue Frog Tavern is an adventure for one player character involving a tavern in a forest.

== Reception ==
Harry White reviewed Blue Frog Tavern in The Space Gamer No. 50. White commented that "Some encounters route you to earlier solitaire dungeons; if you don't have them, buy or die! Other encounters smack of the sudden death paragraphs in former efforts from FBI. But come on in and have a beer, anyway, if you are a solitaire T&T freak."
