= Blue Frog Bar and Grill =

Restaurant chain in China

Blue Frog Food and Beverage Management (Shanghai) Ltd.
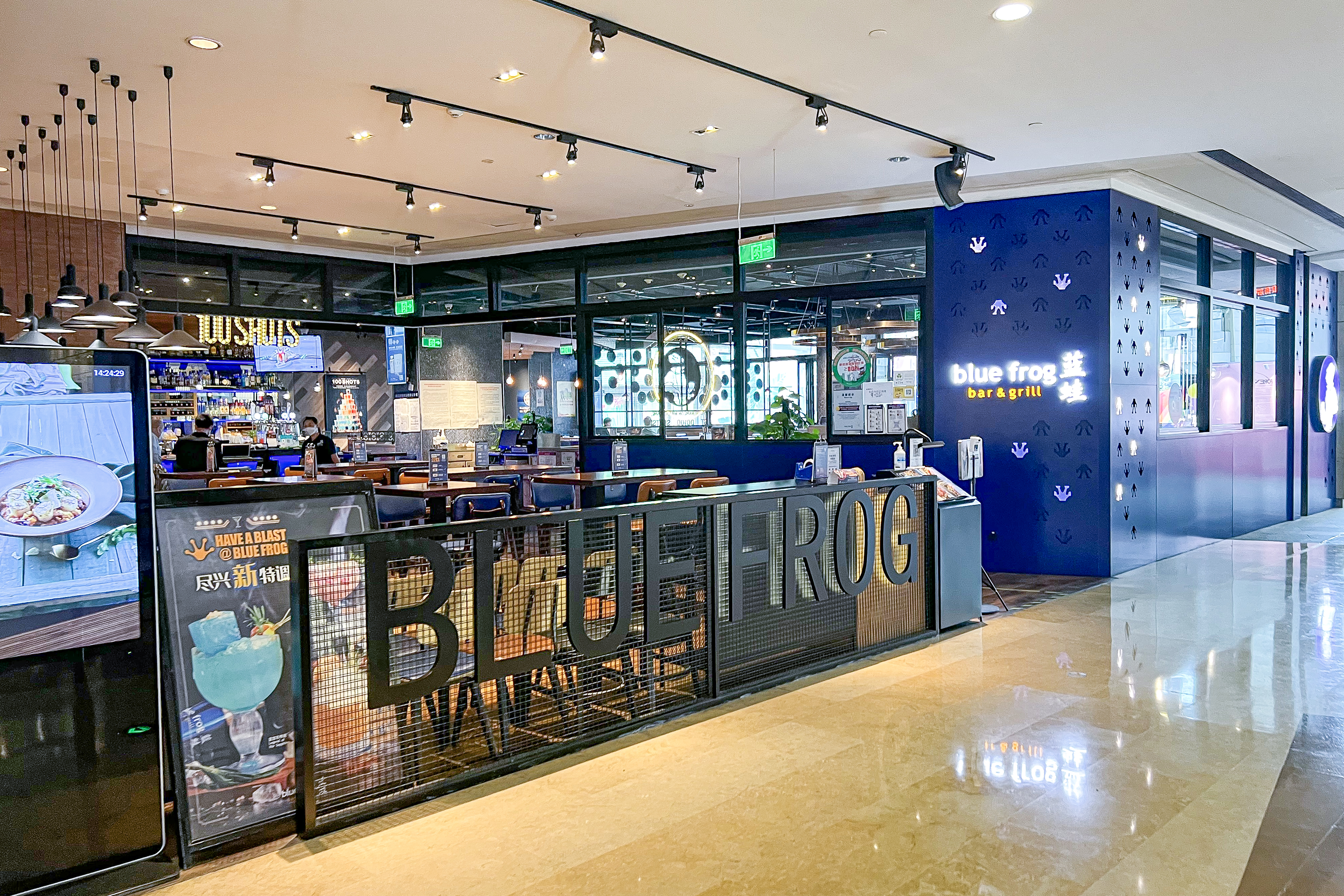
- A Blue Frog Bar & Grill restaurant at INDIGO, Beijing
- Simplified Chinese: 蓝蛙餐饮管理（上海）有限公司
- Traditional Chinese: 藍蛙餐飲管理（上海）有限公司
Transcriptions
Standard Mandarin
- Hanyu Pinyin: Lán Wā Cānyǐn Guǎnlǐ (Shànghǎi) Yǒuxiàngōngsī

Blue Frog Food and Beverage Management (Shanghai) Ltd., doing business as Blue Frog Bar and Grill (Chinese: 蓝蛙; pinyin: Lán Wā), is a Western-style cuisine restaurant chain company in China. A member of AmRest, the company is headquartered in the Shanghai Free-Trade Zone in Pudong.

== History ==
It was established in 1999 by Bob Boyce, an American from Harlowton, Montana, and its first restaurant was opened on South Maoming Road in Shanghai in 2002. That year, Boyce had purchased a restaurant operation from Kathleen Lau, a woman from Boston. Boyce arrived in China in 1994 for the purpose of developing his Chinese language skills. Lau had arrived in China in 1996 and started a restaurant that year in Guangzhou, where she had previously instructed courses for the English language. Boyce met Lau at her restaurant and the two collaborated on starting another restaurant.

It established locations in shopping centers catering to upper class customers. In China beef hamburgers are usually eaten as luxury meals; the price of a typical Blue Frog hamburger, in 2017, was equivalent to 15 U.S. dollars. By 2015 the chain had a mapo tofu style hamburger. Circa 2015, there were ten Blue Frog restaurants in China.

Blue Frog became a part of the Blue Horizons Company, which also operated KAPP locations; KAPP is a bistro-style restaurant with a fancier operation.

== Locations ==
In 2015 Blue Frog operated 24 restaurants in seven cities.

== See also ==
- Element Fresh
- Wagas
