= Sorcerer Solitaire =

Tabletop role-playing game adventure

Cover page for Sorcerer Solitaire

Sorcerer Solitaire is a 1979 role-playing game adventure for Tunnels & Trolls published by Flying Buffalo.

== Plot summary ==
Sorcerer Solitaire is a solo adventure in which the player character is a magic-user investigating a haunted house in the night.

== Reception ==
Lorin Rivers reviewed Sorcerer Solitaire in The Space Gamer No. 28. Rivers commented that "With its good points and bad, this remains a unique and fairly pleasant adventure."
