= Arena of Khazan =

Role-playing game supplement

Arena of Khazan is a 1979 role-playing game adventure for Tunnels & Trolls published by Flying Buffalo.

== Plot summary ==
Arena of Khazan is a scenario involving brutal combat in the arena of the City of Death.

== Reception ==
Lorin Rivers reviewed Arena of Khazan in The Space Gamer No. 28. Rivers commented that "This adventure can be fun, but not recommended for highly-valued characters."
