= Crystal Island: Uncharted Discovery =

Educational video game

Crystal Island: Uncharted Discovery is an educational video game created by a team of educators and computer scientists at the Center for Educational Informatics aimed at teaching students upper elementary science education, focusing on landforms, navigation, and modeling. In the game, students play as shipwrecked adventurers on a volcanic island. To escape the island, they must complete a series of quests that test their critical thinking skills and teach them content-related information. Upon completion of the quests, the players gain access to a new area of the island which contains a multi-skill quest that requires students to use the knowledge and skills they learned during the previous quests. Once the final quest is completed, the players gain access to a communication device which allows them to call the outside world for rescue. The game was made with the Unity game engine. It was made by the same creators of the game Crystal Island: Lost Investigation.

== Setup ==
Teachers are given access to a Crystal Island wiki, which provides them with a suggested schedule and lesson plan, supplemental lessons, and a video tutorial.

== Gameplay ==
Crystal Island includes a virtual tablet in-game that contains applications to help students with quests. The apps include: an "IslandPedia" containing presentations of scientific concepts, a Problem-solving app which helps players understand the scientific problem-solving method, a Text Message app which presents scripted text messages from in-game characters that remind them of the learning resources provided to help them with the quests and to stay on task, a Camera app which allows students to take pictures of in-game landforms, a Note-taking app which allows students to take both text and image notes, a Quest app which shows the current progress that a student has made during a quest, and a Map app which includes a map scale, compass, and a grid that shows students their current location.

== Plot ==
Crystal Island begins with an introductory scene which shows the characters of the video game struggling at sea. The characters eventually reach land, and find that they are stranded on a volcanic island. They begin the start of a new life in a village.
