= Sword for Hire (Flying Buffalo) =

Tabletop role-playing game adventure

Sword for Hire is a 1979 role-playing game adventure for Tunnels & Trolls published by Flying Buffalo.

== Plot summary ==
Sword for Hire is an adventure in which the player character is a low-level fighter or rogue who hires out as a mercenary to a local wizard to explore the sub-levels of his dungeon.

== Reception ==
Lorin Rivers reviewed Sword for Hire in The Space Gamer No. 28. Rivers commented that "In the balance, this dungeon is certainly worth [the price]. I recommend it."
