= City of Terrors =

Role-playing game adventure

City of Terrors is a 1978 role-playing game adventure for Tunnels & Trolls published by Flying Buffalo.

== Plot summary ==
City of Terrors is an adventure where the player characters travel to the island of Phoron where the City of Terrors is located.

== Reception ==
Tom Gordon reviewed City of Terrors in The Space Gamer No. 33. Gordon commented that "The entire booklet (except for the cover) is printed on slick glossy paper. The artwork is fantastic. A 'reincarnation clause' helps eliminate the 'instant death' situations. It is extremely well balanced and worth the money. City of Terrors is by far the best solitaire game Flying Buffalo has produced yet."
