= Goblin Lake =

1979 role-playing game by Flying Buffalo

Goblin Lake is a 1979 role-playing game adventure for Tunnels & Trolls published by Flying Buffalo.

== Premise ==
Goblin Lake is an adventure in which the player character is a goblin.

== Publication history ==
Goblin Lake was the first "pocket adventure" that Flying Buffalo released.

== Reception ==
Lorin Rivers reviewed Goblin Lake in The Space Gamer No. 28. Rivers commented that "I had absolutely no fun. This 'adventure' is brief and not very exciting. It's a bad start for the new format. I don't recommend it."
