= Dargon's Dungeon =

Dargon's Dungeon is a 1977 adventure published by Flying Buffalo for Tunnels & Trolls.

== Gameplay ==
Dargon's Dungeon is an adventure for a single player character.

== Publication history ==
Dargon's Dungeon was first published in 1977, and a remake was published in 1981.

== Reception ==
Forrest Johnson reviewed Dargon's Dungeon in The Space Gamer No. 43. Johnson commented that "If you enjoy pointless solo dungeons, this is a fine one."

Anders Swenson reviewed Dargon's Dungeon for Different Worlds magazine and stated that "Dargon's Dungeon is an adventure where anything goes for the contents of a room - there is a strongly random flavor to the book. It is nevertheless a workmanlike product reflecting the great talents of the new co-authors, and it is worthy of inclusion in anybody's collection of solo T&T adventures."
