= Sewers of Oblivion =

Tabletop role-playing game adventure

Sewers of Oblivion is a 1980 role-playing game adventure for Tunnels & Trolls published by Flying Buffalo.

== Plot summary ==
Sewers of Oblivion is an adventure in which a group of thugs have taken the possessions away from the player character and imprisoned the character in the sewers.

== Reception ==
Clayton Miner reviewed Sewers of Oblivion for Pegasus magazine and stated that "While this product shows alot [sic] of hard work and creativity, it lacks the variety that normally comes about from the interaction of several adventurers and a Judge. Despite this, and the repetition that occurs, this is a good effort, and one that is well worth the price. Many hours of good play await any who is unfortunate enough to be waylaid and thrust into the Sewers of Oblivion."

Anders Swenson reviewed Sewers of Oblivion for Different Worlds magazine and stated that "The T&T solo adventures by Flying Buffalo are generally very good and this one is no exception. Sewers of Oblivion is a good buy for the solo T&Ter."

W.G. Armintrout reviewed Sewers of Oblivion in The Space Gamer No. 51. Armintrout commented that "This is a marvelous creation, but my regular characters wouldn't touch it with a ten-foot pole. I recommend this only for those mythical people with seventh-level supermen!"
