= Monsters! Monsters! =

Tabletop role-playing game supplement

Monsters! Monsters! cover

Monsters! Monsters! is a role-playing game first published by Metagaming Concepts in 1976.

== Description ==
Monsters! Monsters! is a fantasy system in which the player characters are monsters who prey on adventurers and the civilized world. The game's rules systems are essentially compatible with Tunnels & Trolls.

== Publication history ==
Monsters! Monsters! was designed by Ken St. Andre with Jim "Bear" Peters, with art by Liz Danforth, and was published in 1976 by Metagaming Concepts as a 40-page square-bound book. Monsters! Monsters!, St. Andre's third game, was developed by Steve Jackson based on a design by St. Andre related to his Tunnels & Trolls role-playing game. Metagaming Concepts released a second printing in 1976, which was saddle-stitched. Howard M. Thompson provided illustrations for Monsters! Monsters!

Flying Buffalo acquired the rights to reprint the first edition of Monsters! Monsters! in 1979.

In 2020, Ken St. Andre, with Steve Crompton, published a second edition of Monsters! Monsters! which was financed via Kickstarter and published through Trollhalla Press Unlimited (ISBN 978-0-9836929-8-0). That release included a new 26-page GM adventure written specifically for monster characters and the release of a new edition of The Toughest Dungeon in the World, a solitaire adventure also written primarily for Monster characters.

In 2024, St. Andre and Crompton released an expanded edition, numbered edition 2.7, intended to move the Monsters! Monsters! setting from the Trollworld of Tunnels & Trolls to the new world of Zimrala.

...in this 2.7 edition you will see references to Zimrala. That is the new world in which M!M! adventures will be taking place.

— Ken St. Andre, Troll Talk--About Monsters! Monsters!, Monsters! Monsters! 2.7 edition December 2023

Later, in 2024, St. Andre and Crompton followed up the new edition of Monsters! Monsters! with a supplement for playing human and humanoid characters, named Humans! Humans!, published by Trollgodfather Press.

== Reception ==
Ronald Pehr reviewed Monsters! Monsters! in The Space Gamer No. 34. Pehr commented that "Monsters! Monsters! is a good game for beginners or anyone who wants to be a troll, but experienced gamers who enjoy complex campaign games offering more than bloodlust won't find anything they want here."

John ONeill of Black Gate commented, "The game is well written, with plenty of delightful Liz Danforth art, and my games library is no longer missing an important piece of gaming history."

== Reviews ==
- The Playboy Winner's Guide to Board Games
