= Buffalo Castle =

Role-playing game adventure

- Author: Rick Loomis
- Publication date: 1976
- ISBN: 0-940244-01-2

Buffalo Castle is a gamebook first published by Flying Buffalo in 1976 (ISBN 0-940244-01-2). Using the Tunnels & Trolls role-playing system, Buffalo Castle consists of 150 paragraphs in A4 format.

== Description ==
After a friend suggested that someone should make a dungeon adventure book that allows the player to choose an answer and turn to another page, Rick Loomis wrote Buffalo Castle (1976). Buffalo Castle was an introduction to Tunnels & Trolls, a basic dungeon for a warrior of level 1–2.

Although it is widely believed that the Fighting Fantasy series of books were the first gamebooks to use dice and allow the character to possess statistics and equipment, Buffalo Castle pre-dates the Fighting Fantasy series by six years and used the same types of mechanics. Buffalo Castle may have been the first published adventure gamebook.

== Reception ==
Steve Jackson reviewed Buffalo Castle in The Space Gamer No. 9. Jackson concluded, "If you're into role-playing, you'll enjoy Buffalo Castle. If you're into solo role-playing, buy it."

== Reviews ==
- Panzerfaust and Campaign #75

== In other media ==
Buffalo Castle is included in the mobile game Tunnels and Trolls Adventures.
