= Tunnels & Trolls =

Tabletop fantasy role-playing game

- 2015 cover for the current version of T&T. Painting is by Liz Danforth
- Designers: Ken St. Andre, Liz Danforth, Jim "Bear" Peters
- Publishers: Flying Buffalo, Fiery Dragon, Grimtooth
- Publication: 1975 (1st and 2nd ed.); 1976 (3rd ed.); 1977 (4th ed.); 1979 (5th ed.); 2005 (5.5th ed.); 2005 (30th Anniv. Ed. (aka 7th ed.) by Fiery Dragon); 2008 (7.5th ed., by Fiery Dragon); 2012 (8th ed., by Grimtooth; French only); 2015 (Deluxe ed.)
- Genres: Fantasy
- Systems: Custom

Tunnels & Trolls (abbreviated T&T) is a fantasy role-playing game designed by Ken St. Andre and first published in 1975 by Flying Buffalo. The second modern role-playing game published, it was written by Ken St. Andre to be a more accessible alternative to Dungeons & Dragons and is suitable for solitaire, group, and play-by-mail gameplay.

== History ==
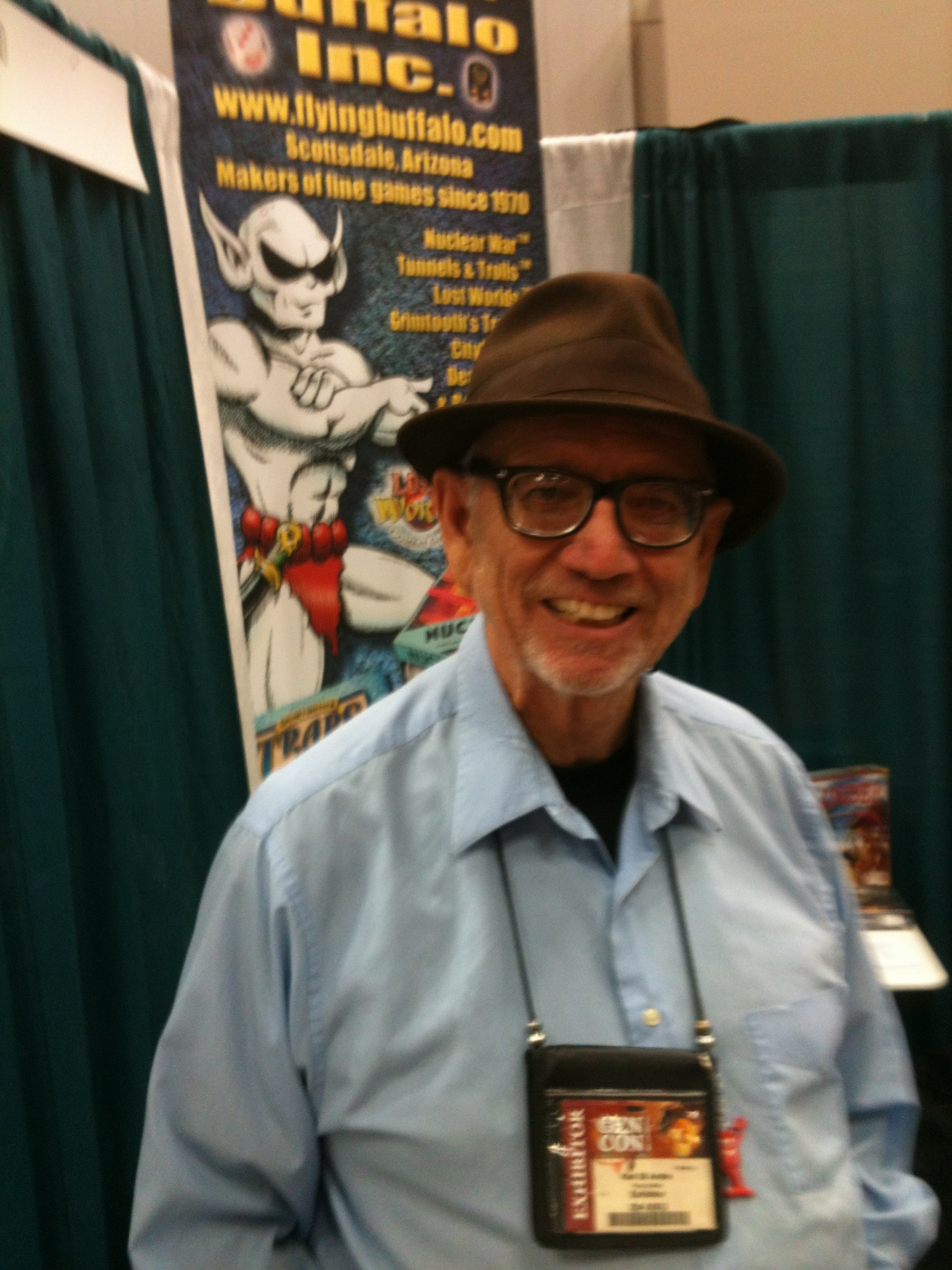
Ken St. Andre designed Tunnels & Trolls.

Ken St. Andre, a public librarian in Phoenix, Arizona, liked the idea of fantasy role-playing after reading a friend's D&D rule books but found the actual rules confusing, so he wrote his own. "I just wanted something I could play with my friends at a reasonable price, with reasonable equipment,” he said. The first edition of Tunnels & Trolls was self-published in April 1975. Flying Buffalo Inc. published a second edition of Tunnels & Trolls in June 1975, which soon became a serious competitor to D&D. Tunnels & Trolls had similar game statistics, character classes, and adventures to Dungeons & Dragons but used a magic system based on points and used only six-sided dice. According to Michael Tresca, Tunnels & Trolls explained its rules better overall, and "brought a sense of impish fun to the genre".

The game underwent several modifications between the original release and when the 5th edition of the rules was published in 1979. This edition was also translated and published abroad in the United Kingdom, Germany, France, Italy, Finland, Japan, and it entered these markets before Dungeons & Dragons did in most cases.

In 1999, Pyramid magazine named Tunnels & Trolls one of "The Millennium's Most Underrated Games". Editor Scott Haring said of the game "everybody knows this was the second ever fantasy roleplaying game ... But to dismiss it as just an opportunistic ripoff would be grossly unfair. Flying Buffalo's T&T had its own zany feel – it was much less serious than D&D – and a less-complicated game system."

In 2005, Flying Buffalo updated the 5th edition rules with a "5.5" publication that added about 40 pages of extra material. That same year, Fiery Dragon Productions produced a 30th Anniversary Edition under license in a tin box complete with CD, map, monster counters, and two new versions of the rules. Ken St. Andre used the opportunity to extensively update the style of play and introduce new role-playing concepts, such as character level determined by character attribute statistics instead of arbitrary numbers of experience points. The 30th Anniversary rules are generally known as the 7th edition. The 7th edition also introduced a skills system. The 7.5 edition was released in 2008 by Fiery Dragon, being an update and clarification on the 30th Anniversary Edition.

In 2012, Tunnels & Trolls was re-introduced in French-speaking markets by Grimtooth under license by Flying Buffalo. The French rulebook, which is officially the 8th edition, is based on the 7th edition, but includes elements taken from the 5.5 edition as well as clarifications by Ken St. Andre. The interior artwork includes the illustrations of the 5th edition, plus new inks by Liz Danforth. Several other products (solos and GM adventures) have been released via Lulu.com, and others have been announced.

The production work for the 8th edition prompted Flying Buffalo to start working on a Deluxe (9th) Edition of the rulebook. As Rick Loomis, head of Flying Buffalo Inc., put it, "The French edition came out so beautiful that now that I have run out of 5.5, I am not satisfied to just reprint 5.5. I wanted to have a deluxe edition even better than the French one. (Competition is what drives us to be better!)". Deluxe Tunnels & Trolls, written by St. Andre with additional design input and editing from longtime players Liz Danforth and James "Bear" Peters, was published in August 2015.

In July 2021, Webbed Sphere bought Flying Buffalo, along with its catalog, but not including its Play By Mail games. In 2023, Webbed Sphere terminated licenses previously granted by Rick Loomis and Flying Buffalo to third party publishers of Tunnels & Trolls products. During their ownership of the company and the Tunnels & Trolls intellectual property, Webbed Sphere did not release any new versions of the game.

In May 2023, Webbed Sphere sold Tunnels & Trolls, in addition to Flying Buffalo's entire range of role-playing games, including the Citybook and Grimtooth products, as well as Mercenaries, Spies and Private Eyes, to Rebellion Unplugged's table top role playing game division.

Across March and April 2026, Rebellion Unplugged ran a Kickstarter campaign for the first new edition to be created since the Deluxe Tunnels & Trolls edition in 2015. Named "Tunnels & Trolls: A New Age," the edition's campaign established a £20,000 goal, which was more than quintupled in campaign pledges by the time the campaign ended. The edition, which featured a Core Book, a City Book, and a Campaign Book, among other items such as dice, map and game master aids, was planned for delivery in May of 2027. The game company, which committed to honoring the legacy of previous editions, while at the same time "reimagining... the classic game" (which has been rebranded as Tunnels & Trolls Heritage), described their approach to the new edition:

Tunnels & Trolls has been lovingly reborn for a new generation of fantasy roleplayers, blending the spirit of the original with the best of modern tabletop design. The result is a fresh, streamlined ruleset that is easy to learn for newcomers while evolving the most loved elements of the classic game for veteran fans.

== Setting ==
The 5th edition Tunnels & Trolls core ruleset does not detail a specific setting, saying only that gameplay occurs in "a world somewhat but not exactly similar to Tolkien's Middle Earth." In an interview in 1986, Ken St. Andre stated that "my conception of the T&T world was based on The Lord of The Rings as it would have been done by Marvel Comics in 1974 with Conan, Elric, the Gray Mouser and a host of badguys thrown in."

The current Deluxe Edition includes Ken St. Andre's house campaign setting, Trollworld, along with additional material by early players Jim "Bear" Peters and Liz Danforth.

== Gameplay ==
=== Prime attributes ===
Eight prime attributes define characters in Tunnels & Trolls:

- Strength (ST) determines which weapons the character can use and how much the character can carry. It also serves as magic points in 5th and earlier editions.
- Intelligence (IQ) measures the character's ability to think and remember facts.
- Luck (LK) affects combat results and saving throws.
- Constitution (CON) measures how healthy the character is and how much damage the character can take before being killed.
- Dexterity (DEX) represents agility, nimbleness and affects marksmanship.
- Charisma (CHR) represents attractiveness and leadership ability.

Later editions add the following prime attributes:

- Wizardry (WIZ) replaces Strength for powering magic points. Also called Power (POW) in the 5.5 Edition.
- Speed (SPD) represents reaction speed and, in some editions, movement rate.

A new character begins with a randomly generated score for each attribute, determined by rolling three six-sided dice.

=== Character races ===
The rules recommend that novice players create human characters but also offer the options of elves, dwarves, and hobbits. Other races like leprechauns and fairies serve as additional character options. A character's race affects his or her attributes. A player may also choose to play as a "monster race" such as a zombie or vampire.

=== Character classes ===
Players also choose a character class for their character. The two base classes are Warriors and Wizards. Wizards can cast spells but have combat limitations. While Warriors cannot cast magic, they are allowed the full use of weapons, and armor is twice as effective in blocking damage. Rogues and Warrior-Wizards are also available as character classes. Both classes combine the abilities of the Warrior and the Wizard. Rogues in Tunnels & Trolls, unlike the Rogue classes in Dungeons & Dragons, are not thieves, but could be more accurately described as 'Rogue Wizards'. Rogues are limited in their spell-casting abilities, can use the same range of combat weapons and armor as a warrior, and do not receive the Warrior's armor bonus or the Wizard's spell-creating ability. Warrior-Wizards are not so limited, but the player must be lucky with the dice when creating the character: high minimum attribute scores are required. Later editions include new classes such as Specialist Mage, Paragon (a renaming of the Warrior-Wizard), Leader, and Ranger.

=== Starting equipment and money ===
New characters begin with a number of gold pieces determined by rolling three six-sided dice and multiplying the total by ten. These gold pieces can be used to buy weapons, armor, and other equipment.

=== Combat ===
Combat is handled by comparing dice rolls between a character and his opponent. Both sides roll a number of dice determined by which weapon is in use, then modify the appropriate result by "personal adds". Totals are compared, with the higher roll damaging the opposing combatant by the difference in totals. Armor absorbs this damage taken, and any amount remaining is subtracted from the Constitution attribute.

Tunnels & Trolls is unusual among roleplaying games in conducting mass combat resolution with one set of rolls, as the above system applies to combat between any number of opponents.

Personal adds are determined by Strength, Luck, and Dexterity. For every point above 12 possessed in each of these attributes, the character receives a one-point bonus to his personal adds. Similarly, for every point below 9 possessed in each of these attributes, the character receives a one-point penalty.

In the 7th Edition, the formula was changed to include Speed in the personal adds. This also applies to the Deluxe Edition.

The 5.5, 7th and Deluxe editions include 'spite damage' whereby each "6" rolled on the combat dice causes a minimum of one damage to be inflicted on the opposing side, regardless of armor or the respective combat totals. This helped resolve the interminable stalemate that could occur between evenly matched, heavily armored opponents.

=== Saving rolls ===
The Saving Roll (SR) is used during combat to break a stalemate or overcome the characters being outmatched as well as for use of ranged weapons. The SR is also used in all other tests of skill or luck the characters may be presented with by the GM or solo adventure. Checks are made using a character's attribute plus 2d6 (doubles add and roll over) against a difficulty level based on the task at hand. For every level of saving roll the formula is 15+5x, with x being the level of difficulty. This was one of the earliest uses of this mechanic in RPGs.

== Reception ==
In the third issue of The Space Gamer, Brant Bates called the first edition of Tunnels & Trolls "very playable, and a lot of fun", and recommended it for fantasy fans who are "not purists."

Lewis Pulsipher reviewed Tunnels & Trolls for White Dwarf #2, and stated that "T&T is much more limited than D&D in every way. Anyone who likes T&T will sooner or later 'graduate' to the much more satisfying (and much more widely played) D&D."

Five years later, in the March–April 1980 edition of The Space Gamer (Issue 27), Steve Jackson said of the 5th edition, "On the whole, a good book, worth the price for any adventure gamer just for the ideas and comments it holds. A must for anyone playing T&T with an earlier edition."

That same year, in the July 1980 edition of Ares (Issue 3), Eric Goldberg dismissed the 5th edition as "a pleasant puff piece", although he agreed that since 1st edition, "the production values have increased from amateur status to a nearly professional standard." However, he did not recommend it, saying, "the game will be passed over by all but the completist; there are better buys on the market now."

In the 1980 book The Complete Book of Wargames, game designer Jon Freeman commented, "Tunnels & Trolls was specifically designed to be a cheaper and simpler Dungeons & Dragons. It's both — and faster — but not better. Several new editions over the past few years have added a few suggestions and clarifications, but there are still nearly as many holes in the rules as there were in Dungeons & Dragons." Freeman specifically had issues with the lack of monster lists, treasure lists, and thief abilities, and found combat to be "unsatisfyingly gross." He also objected to the "tacky" names for spells such as Too-Bad Toxin, Dum-Dum and Upsidaisy, saying that they "lend the game an air of Ali Baba and the Three Stooges." Freeman gave this game an Overall Evaluation of only "Fair", concluding, "There are better alternatives available."

Ken Rolston reviewed Tunnels & Trolls for Different Worlds magazine and stated that "T&T is a system which I believe compares favorably with the other FRP systems available, and one which I believe is worth your attention. I have enjoyed the years I have played the system, and I believe T&T represents a particularly attractive philosophy of FRP - a philosophy that deserves your consideration whether you play the T&T system or not."

In the August 1992 edition of Dragon (Issue 184), Rick Swan liked several aspects of the 5th edition: "What the combat system lacks in realism, it makes up for in simplicity and speed" and "Players... will find the magic system to be exceptionally clever." Swan criticized the imprecision of the rules, calling them "a hairsplitter's delight", as well as the simplicity of the monster ratings, which meant "there's no meaningful distinction between fighting a giant slug and a drunken swordsman." But he concluded that the simplicity of the rules was its own virtue, especially for new players. "The Tunnels & Trolls game is by no means the most sophisticated alternative to the D&D game — the AD&D game, the Avalon Hill Game Company's Runequest game, and even the new Lord of the Rings game are all better designs — but it's certainly the easiest to learn. A beginner should be able to master it in an afternoon, and a veteran will probably nail it in under an hour."

In his 1990 book The Complete Guide to Role-Playing Games, game critic Rick Swan called this "One of the earliest and most enduring fantasy RPGs." Swan thought that "With its streamlined systems, T&T is the perfect choice for players who react to charts and tables like vampires react to crosses." Swan admitted that "Combat is painfully abstract" and noted that there were apparently no limits to how much a character's attributes can increase. Despite these problems, Swan gave the game a solid rating of 3 out of 4.

In a 1996 reader poll undertaken by Arcane magazine to determine the 50 most popular roleplaying games of all time, Tunnels and Trolls was ranked 32nd. Paul Pettengale, the magazine's editor, called T&T "pretty crude", noting its early release, and said "It's probably here for nostalgic reasons."

In his 2023 book Monsters, Aliens, and Holes in the Ground, RPG historian Stu Horvath noted, "By embracing simplicity, Tunnels & Trolls is the first major divergence [from D&D] in RPG design, one that would eventually turn into a sturdy branch of the RPG family tree, full of stripped down, minimalist fruit ... At a glance, Tunnels & Trolls and Thousand Year Old Vampire (2019) have very little in common, but deep down, there is an unbroken line of descent."

== List of Tunnels & Trolls publications ==
Tunnels & Trolls was also the first system to publish a series of fantasy-themed gamebooks - adventures which are designed to be played by one person, without the need for a referee. At least twenty such adventures were published by Flying Buffalo. The Fighting Fantasy series achieved great popularity using this format. Both T&T's simplicity and its reliance on use of six-sided dice (as compared to the various polyhedral dice used by Dungeons and Dragons) contributed to its success in this format.

=== Solo adventures ===
- Buffalo Castle by Rick Loomis
- Deathtrap Equalizer Dungeon by Ken St. Andre
- Labyrinth by Lee Russell
- Naked Doom by Ken St. Andre
- Dargon's Dungeon by Michael Stackpole
- Weirdworld by Keith Abbott- 1979
- Overkill by Michael Stackpole
- Beyond the Silvered Pane by James & Steven Marciniak- 1978
- City of Terrors by Michael Stackpole
- Sorcerer Solitaire by Walker Vaning
- Sword for Hire by James Wilson
- Arena of Khazan by Ken St. Andre
- Sewers of Oblivion by Michael Stackpole
- Sea of Mystery by Gienn Rahman
- Blue Frog Tavern by James Wilson
- Mistywood by Roy Cram Jr.
- Gamesmen of Kasar by Roy Cram
- Beyond the Wall of Tears by K. Martin Aul
- Captif d'Yvoire by Steven Estvanik
- The Amulet of the Salkti by David Steven Moskowitz- 1986
- Red Circle by Michael Stackpole- 1987
- Elven Lords by Michael Stackpole- 1990
- Caravan to Tiern by Andrea Mills- 1989
- The Dark Temple by Stefan E. Jones- 1991
- When the Cat's Away by Catherine DeMott, James L. Walker & Rick Loomis
- Elven Lords by Michael Stackpole, Limited Edition
- Rescue Mission by Ken St. Andre in 2011 Free RPG Day publication
- Adventurers Compendium 10 solos by various authors- 2014
- Agent of Death by Ken St. Andre
- Agent of Death by Ken St. Andre in 2017
- T&T Adventures Japan by various Authors in 2018
- Vaults of K'Horror by Andy Holmes & Ken St. Andre- 2018
- Alice in Weirdworld by Joel Marler- 2020

=== GM adventures ===
- The Dungeon of the Bear by Jim "Bear" Peters
- Uncle Ugly's Underground by Ugly John Carver
- Catacombs of the Bear Cult by Jim "Bear" Peters
- Isle of Darksmoke by Larry DiTillio
- Trollstone Caverns by Ken St. Andre
- Goblin Crag Level 1 by Andy Holmes
- Take the Money by Ken St. Andre
- Riverboat Adventure by Ken St. Andre in 2011 Free RPG Day publication
- Vaults of K'Horror by Andy Holmes

=== Pocket solo adventures ===
- Goblin Lake by Ken St. Andre
- Abyss by Paul Creelman
- Circle of Ice by Paul Creelman

=== Gamemaster supplements ===
- T&T Game Master Notebook & Screen
- T&T Survival Kit

=== Supplements by other companies ===
- The Esgaroth Herald written and published by Andrew McLaren

==== Cliffhanger ====
- Keepers of Lingusia by Tori Bergquist

==== Judges Guild ====
- Jungle of Lost Souls by Glenn Rahman
- The Toughest Dungeon in the World (solo) by Ken St. Andre
- Rat on a Stick by George R. Paczolt

==== Rider Creations ====
- Castles and Kingdoms by Bob Liddil
- Demons and Notmen
- Dimensions and Doors by Robert W. Liddil

=== Sorcerer's Apprentice magazine ===
Sorcerer's Apprentice was the Tunnels & Trolls magazine published by Flying Buffalo. In Ken St. Andre's editorial in the first issue (Winter 1978) the magazine was described as a "'zine based around T&T specifically and fantasy role-playing in general".

=== Reference publications ===
A number of books were published that support GMs by giving them ideas for "traps" and other tools for creating adventures when designing a dungeon or adventure. One example is the Grimtooth's Traps series, authored by Paul O'Connor (and others), that is a listing of traps that GMs can insert into their adventures.

== Spin-offs ==
Monsters! Monsters! is a subset of the T&T rules tailored to playing monsters. It is fully compatible with 5th edition. Copyright dates listed are 1976 and 1979, published by Metagaming and then Flying Buffalo. It is occasionally reprinted as photocopies by the author, Ken St. Andre. It is now available from Flying Buffalo.

Mercenaries, Spies and Private Eyes is a variant system credited to Michael A. Stackpole. Publication was by Flying Buffalo, who released it in 1983, and Sleuth Publications Ltd. in 1986. While the basics are the same, it adds a skill system, changes the time scale of combat rounds, and includes rules for modern weapons.

=== Video games ===
In the 1980s, a ColecoVision adaptation was announced but never released.

In 1990 a computer version (Crusaders of Khazan) was published by New World Computing, which embedded portions of many of the favorite old solo modules. Crusaders of Khazan is included in the 30th Anniversary Edition tin, but not the PDF version.

In 2008, an Amiga and Windows adaptation was released by James Jacobs.

In 2017, MetaArcade has published Tunnels & Trolls Adventures for iOS and Android, an adaptation of Tunnels & Trolls featuring over 20 classic quests. According to MetaArcade, new content will be published on a regular basis. Due to rights over the IP changing hands and the content being primarily web-hosted, the app and content is no longer available.

== See also ==
- Stormbringer (role-playing game) and Starfaring (role-playing game) are also designed by Ken St. Andre
