= Pittsburgh Comicon =

Comic book convention in Monroeville, Pennsylvania

Coordinates: 40.4°N 79.8°W

- Status: Nonactive
- Genre: Multi-genre
- Venue: Radisson Hotel Pittsburgh ExpoMart (1994–2008); Monroeville Convention Center (2009–2014); David L. Lawrence Convention Center (2015–2016, 2019)
- Locations: Monroeville, Pennsylvania (1994–2014); Pittsburgh, Pennsylvania (2015–2016, 2019)
- Country: United States
- Inaugurated: 1994
- Most recent: 2019
- Attendance: c. 10,000 (2011)
- Organizer: Comics World (1994–2014); Wizard World (2015–2019)
- Filing status: For-profit
- Website: www.pittsburghcomiccon.com

The Pittsburgh Comicon, later known as Wizard World Comic Con Pittsburgh and since succeeded by Steel-City Con, was a comic book convention held in Monroeville, Pennsylvania, United States. It was founded in 1994 by Michael and Renee George. It was traditionally a three-day event (Friday through Sunday) and featured a fan-friendly experience that allowed the fans to interact with comic professionals at all levels.

Though it primarily focused on comic books, the convention featured a large range of pop culture elements, such as professional wrestling, science fiction/fantasy, film/television, animation, anime, manga, toys, collectible card games, video games, webcomics, and fantasy novels. Given Pittsburgh's connection to George A. Romero's zombie apocalypse films (with Romero's Dawn of the Dead being filmed in the Monroeville Mall), horror fans were also welcomed at the convention to meet and greet with the film's actors that regularly attended.

The show also made a concerted effort to promote local-area talent and publishers. The show raised money for various charities; over the years the show had supported local literacy organizations, the Comic book Legal Defense Fund, local Food Banks, and had raised more than $250,000 for the Pittsburgh chapter of the Make-A-Wish Foundation.

== History ==
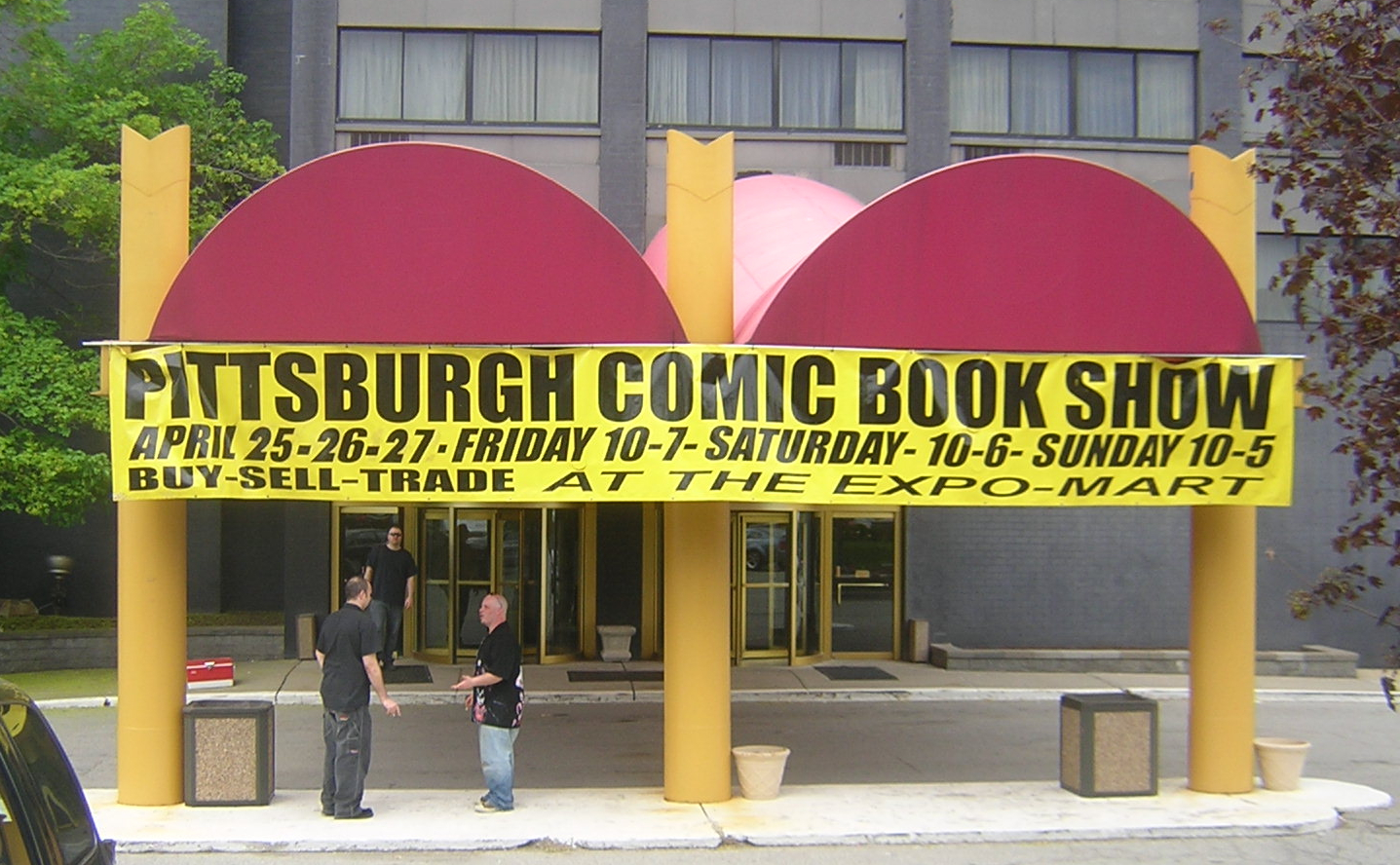
The entrance to the 2008 Pittsburgh Comicon at the Monroeville, Pennsylvania Expomart.

Windber, Pennsylvania-based comics retailers Michael and Renée George (proprietors of Comics World) staged the first Pittsburgh Comicon in April 1994 at the Radisson Hotel Pittsburgh ExpoMart in Monroeville. It was the first major show staged in Pittsburgh for the comic community since the 1970s. From the beginning, a major focus for the show has been giving to charity, the Make-A-Wish Foundation in particular, which is the primary beneficiary of the Annual Comicon Auction.

The Pittsburgh Comicon hosted the Harvey Award ceremonies from 2000–2002, with Evan Dorkin serving as master of ceremonies. Jeff Smith was the keynote speaker of the 2000 awards. Superstar creator Frank Miller gave the keynote speech at the 2001 award ceremony in which he vilified the comic book speculating industry, in particular Wizard magazine. He ended his speech by tearing up a copy of Wizard. Tony Millionaire gave the keynote speech at the 2002 awards ceremony. In 2003, due to a cancellation from scheduled keynote speaker Neil Gaiman, funding shortages forced a cancellation of that year's Harvey Awards ceremony and banquet (which had also been scheduled for the Pittsburgh Comicon), although award-winners were still named.

The 2000 edition of the show raised $26,000 for the Pittsburgh chapter of the Make-A-Wish Foundation. The 2003 show raised $27,000 for the Make-A-Wish Foundation. The 2007 show raised $30,000 for the Make-A-Wish Foundation and $5,000 for the Comic Book Legal Defense Fund.

In 2006, Comic Geek Speak was named the Official Comics Podcast for the Pittsburgh Comicon and has held that title ever since.

In 2009, the show moved from the defunct Pittsburgh ExpoMart to the new Monroeville Convention Center, welcoming Stan Lee as their guest of honor to inaugurate their first show in the new venue.

In 2015, Pittsburgh Comicon was acquired by Wizard World, becoming Wizard World Comic Con Pittsburgh. In addition, the convention moved to the David L. Lawrence Convention Center in Pittsburgh. Wizard World held the convention there for two years, but did not hold one in 2017 or 2018. The convention returned to Pittsburgh in 2019.

After the 2019 show, the official website URL, PittsburghComicon.com, redirected to the Steel City Con, held at the Monroeville Convention Center, leading to the assumption that the Pittsburgh Comicon was defunct.

=== Dates and locations ===
Dates	Attendance	Official guests	Notes
April 1994		John Byrne, Rob Liefeld, Eric Stephenson, Dan Fraga, Jim Valentino, Dave Sim, Steve Rude	
April 1995		Marc Silvestri, Boris Vallejo, Julie Bell, Mike Heisler	
April 19–21, 1996		Stan Lee, Jim Shooter, and Julius Schwartz, Rob Liefeld, Martin Nodell, Patrick Block, Ron Frenz, Tony Daniel, Larry Elmore, Dan Fraga, Randy Green, Irwin Hasen, Gil Kane, Mark Morales, Michael Turner	
April 18–20, 1997		David Prowse	Carmen Electra was a last-minute cancellation
April 25–26, 1998		Kevin Smith and Jim Mahfood, Mark Waid, James Robinson, Mike Allred, Drew Hayes, David Finch, David Wohl, Billy Tan, Jimmy Palmiotti, Joe Quesada, Amanda Conner, Billy Tucci, Howard Porter, David Mack, Gray Morrow, Clayburn Moore, Martin Nodell, Sheldon Moldoff, Dick Ayers	
April 23–25, 1999	7,500	Martin Nodell, Alley Baggett, Lou Ferrigno, George Steele, Steve Lieber, Michael Turner, George Pérez, Brian Pulido, Tom Savini, Mark Waid, Scott Lobdell, Joe Jusko, Dick Ayers, Michael Bair, Dorian Clevenger, Scott McDaniel, Gray Morrow, John Totleben	
April 28–30, 2000	10,000		Presentation of the Harvey Awards
April 27–29, 2001		Frank Miller, Jeff Smith, Gilbert Hernandez, Jaime Hernandez, Dave Cooper, Dan Clowes, Frank Cho, Mark Schultz, Scott McDaniel, Tom Savini, Chyna, Michonne Bourriague, Paul Blake, Claire Stansfield, Alexandra Tydings, Terry Moore, Dean Haspiel, Josh Neufeld, Erik Larsen, John Romita Jr., Jim Valentino, Tim Truman, Brian Michael Bendis, Keu Cha, Jeff Smith, Al Williamson, David Emge, Ken Foree, Scott Reiniger, Larry Elmore, George Pérez, Tom Savini	$15 per day; $35 for 3-day pass; presentation of the Harvey Awards
April 26–28, 2002		Carmine Infantino, William Tucci, George Pérez, Ted Dibiase, Nikolai Volkoff, Frank Cho, Julius Schwartz, Al Williamson, Kenny Baker, Michonne Bourraigue, Jerome Blake, Tim Bradstreet, Michael Kaluta, Julius Schwartz, Brian Michael Bendis, Joe Quesada, Robert Kirkman, Chris Sprouse, George Tuska, Brian Azzarello, Jill Thompson, and Evan Dorkin	
April 25–27, 2003		Terry Austin, Terry Moore, Wayne Wise, Adam Hughes, Bill Morrison, Erin Gray, George Pérez, Joseph Michael Linsner, Jim Balent, Michael Turner, George Tuska, Mike Deodato, Michael Turner, Frank Cho, Jimmy Palmiotti, Amanda Conner, Angel Medina, Mark Schultz, Michael Kaluta, Rowena, Jennifer Janesko, David Mack, King Kong Bundy, Greg Nicotero, Jim Krut	
April 30–May 2, 2004		Jim Rugg, George A. Romero, Lani Tupu, and Virginia Hey, Bernie Wrightson, Michael Turner, Mark Waid, John Romita Jr., Angel Medina, George Pérez, Greg Horn, Rudy Nebres	
April 22–24, 2005		George Pérez, Tom DeFalco, Ron Frenz, Michael Kaluta, Joseph Michael Linsner, Scott McDaniel, Jimmy Palmiotti, Howard Porter, Mark Texeira, Tom Smith, Michael Turner, and Sal Buscema	
April 21–23, 2006	8,400	George Pérez, Brian Michael Bendis, Jimmy Palmiotti, Amanda Conner, Jim Balent, Adam Hughes, Greg Horn, Michael Turner, Mark Waid, Bob McLeod, Howard Chaykin, Arthur Suydam, Timothy Truman, Joseph Michael Linsner, Bruno Sammartino, Ray Park, Ed Piskor, and Ron Frenz	
April 27–29, 2007		George Pérez, Ron Frenz, Terry Moore, Amanda Conner, Mike Grell, Adam Hughes, Joe Jusko, Joseph Michael Linsner, David W. Mack, Kane Hodder, Marc Singer, and Gigi Edgley	
April 25–27, 2008	7,000	Timothy Truman, Mike Grell, and Robert Tinnell, Tom DeFalco, Ron Frenz, Billy Tucci, David W. Mack, Tommy Castillo, David Prowse, Aaron Douglas, Brian Harnois, Kane Hodder, Francis Manapul, Jim Balent, Herb Trimpe, Arthur Suydam, Brian Pulido, Al Feinstein, Michael Golden, Michael Turner, Eric Basaldua, Patrick Block, Alex Saviuk	15th anniversary show
September 11–13, 2009	10,000	Guest of honor: Stan Lee; other guests include Beau Smith, Billy Tucci, Khoi Pham, Terry Moore, Scott James, Sean McKeever, Joe Jusko, Pat Olliffe, Ron Frenz, Brian Pulido, Dawn Best, Dan Fraga, Herb Trimpe, Gary Friedrich, Adam Hughes, Jamal Igle, Greg Horn, Arthur Suydam, Mike Grell, Eric Basaldua, Josh Medors, Talent Caldwell, Ramona Fradon, Darryl Banks	First show in the new Monroeville Convention Center
April 23–25, 2010	9,000	Roy Thomas, Gene Colan, Joe Sinnott, Ernie Chan, Herb Trimpe, Gary Friedrich, Talent Caldwell, Eric Basaldua, Margot Kidder, and Camden Toy	
April 15–17, 2011	c. 10,000	George Pérez, Terry Moore, Mike Grell, Tom Mandrake, Ernie Chan, Herb Trimpe, Scott McDaniel, Joshua Ortega, Joe Jusko, Gary Friedrich, Talent Caldwell, Stuart Sayger, Bob Almond, Wayne Faucher, Chad Hardin, Bob Hall, Kirk Lindo, Arvell Jones, Dan Parent, Billy Tucci, Dave Hoover, Mike Grell, Sam Witwer, Chandler Riggs, Sarah Allen, Dexter Vines, and Charles Paul Wilson III	
April 20–22, 2012		Stan Lee, Bob Almond, Jim Balent, Darryl Banks, Eric Basaldua, Robert Brewer, J. Scott Campbell, Tommy Castillo, Daxiong, Ron Frenz, Holly G, Adela Garcia, Mike Grell, Scott Hedlund, Terry Huddleston, Barry Kitson, Robert Kraus, Adam Mayfield, Peter Mayhew, Scott McDaniel, Paul Monsky, Chris Moreno, Rudy Nebres, Mike Okamoto, Pat Olliffe, George Pérez, Ian Petrella, Budd Root, Alex Saviuk, Stuart Sayger, Larry Thomas, Tim Vigil, Neil Vokes, Lee Weeks, and Ron Wilson	
September 27–29, 2013		Jim Steranko, Jim Balent, Holly G!, Eric Basaldua, John Beatty, Paris Cullins, Michael Golden, Graham Nolan, Barry Kitson, Scott McDaniel, George Pérez, Gene Gonzales, Louis Small Jr., Budd Root	
September 26–28, 2014		Bill Sienkiewicz, Jim Balent, Holly G!, Eric Basaldua, Scott McDaniel, George Pérez, Budd Root, Bob Camp, Talent Caldwell, Katie Cook, Herb Trimpe, John Beatty, Mike Grell, Chad Hardin, Holly Conrad, Patrick & Shelly Block, Ron Frenz, Rudy Nebres, Patrick Olliffe	
September 11–13, 2015		Neal Adams, Adam Baldwin, Dean Cain, Lou Ferrigno, Jason David Frank, Ernie Hudson, Rob Liefeld, James Marsters, Eddie McClintock, William Shatner, Jewel Staite	First show held by Wizard World; first show at the David L. Lawrence Convention Center
November 4–6, 2016		Sam Ellis, Jonathan Frakes, Joel Hodgson, Geof Isherwood, Kurt Lehner, Charles Martinet, Michelle Mussoni, Nichelle Nichols, James O'Barr, Sean Schemmel, Kevin Sorbo, YuffieBunny	
July 26–28, 2019		Jason Faunt, Kurt Lehner, Zachary Levi, Drew Powell, Don Simpson, Jewel Staite, Michael Wilson	The convention returns after a three-year absence

== Events ==
Along with panels, seminars, and workshops with comic book professionals, there were previews of upcoming feature films, portfolio review sessions with top comic book and video game companies, and such evening events as a costume contest, featuring dedicated cosplayers who put great effort into their costumes and props. Traditional events included gaming and hours of other programming on all aspects of comic books and pop culture.

One popular annual event was the Comic Book Legal Defense Fund Quick-Sketch, which usually raised between $5,000 to $6,000 per show. Other charity events taking place during the Pittsburgh Comicon were the annual "Casino Night," and various drawings and donations from attendees. These events benefited such charities as The Hero Initiative and local food banks.

Like most comic-book conventions, the Pittsburgh Comicon featured a large floorspace for exhibitors. These included media companies such as movie studios and TV networks, as well as comic-book dealers and collectibles merchants. Like most comics conventions, the Pittsburgh show included an autograph area, as well as the Artists' Alley where comics artists could sign autographs and sell or do free sketches. Despite the name, Artists' Alley could include writers and even glamour models.

== Charity ==
The Pittsburgh Comicon supported many charities through its fund raising efforts. The primary charity of the Comicon was the Make-A-Wish Foundation. Since the show's inception, the Comicon had raised enough funds to fulfill a number of wishes. The Annual Charity Auction was the main fundraising event during the show for this charity. It had been privileged over the years to be the recipient of the works of many talented guests willing to provide artwork and other items to be auctioned off to benefit this deserving charity.

The Comicon also held 'Charity Quick Sketch' events featuring numerous guests that volunteered to attend the hour-long events and provide original art, usually created in front of a live audience, for the event. During the event, raffle tickets could be purchased by attendees for a sum, which was donated to the charity featured at the event, and each piece of art created during the event was raffled off by picking a ticket from those sold.

== Gallery ==
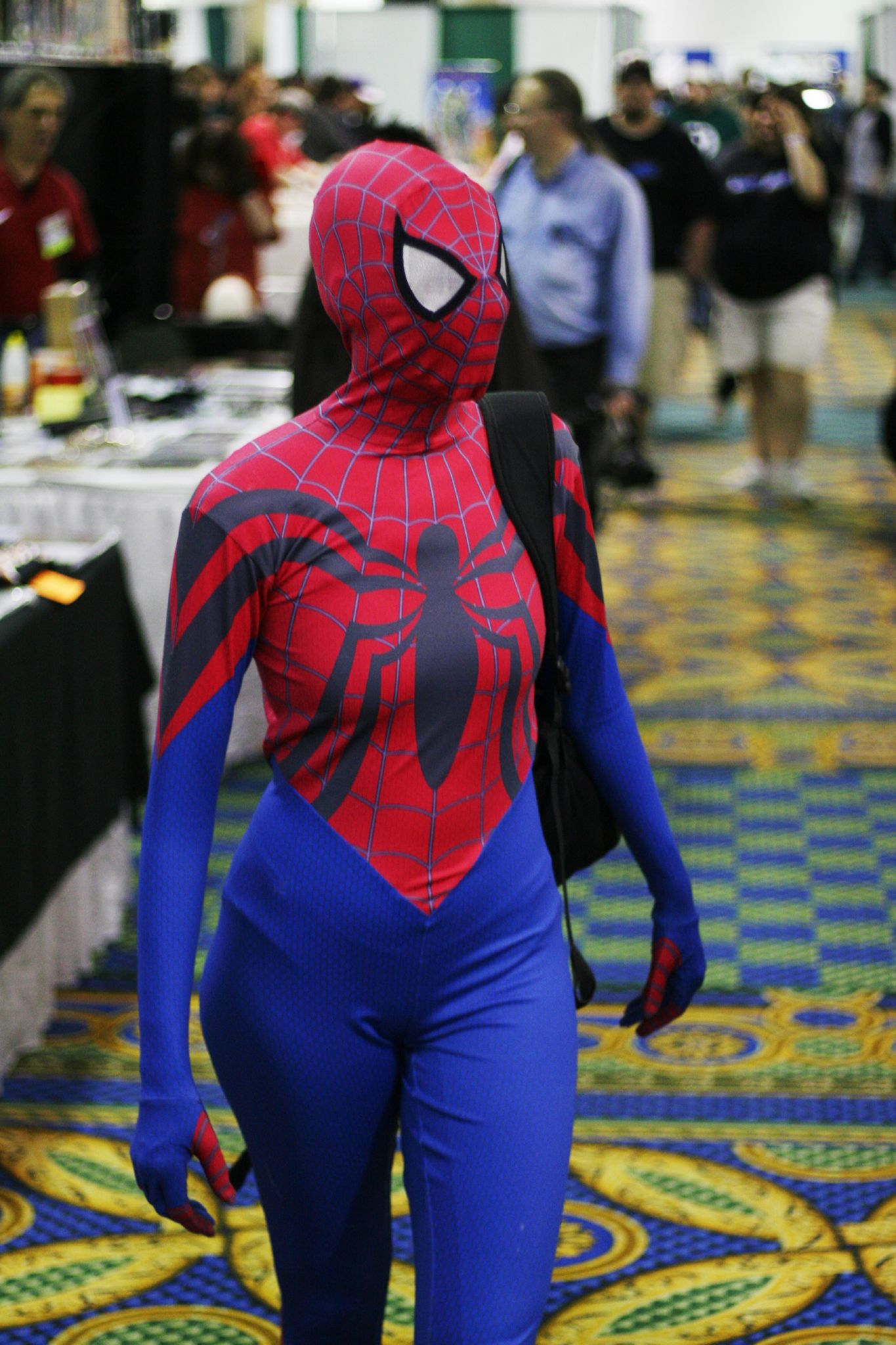
Spider-Girl

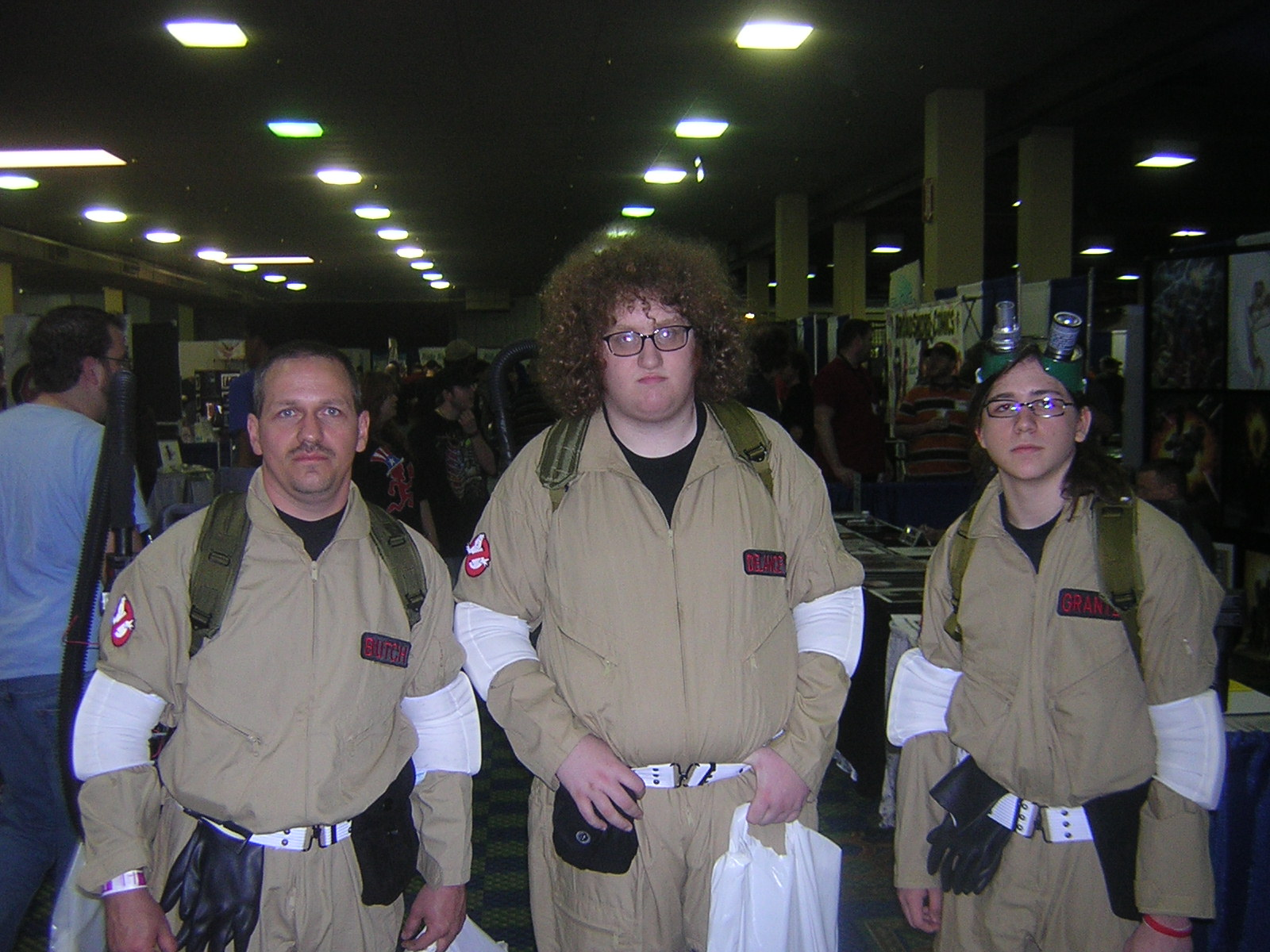
Sad Ghostbusters

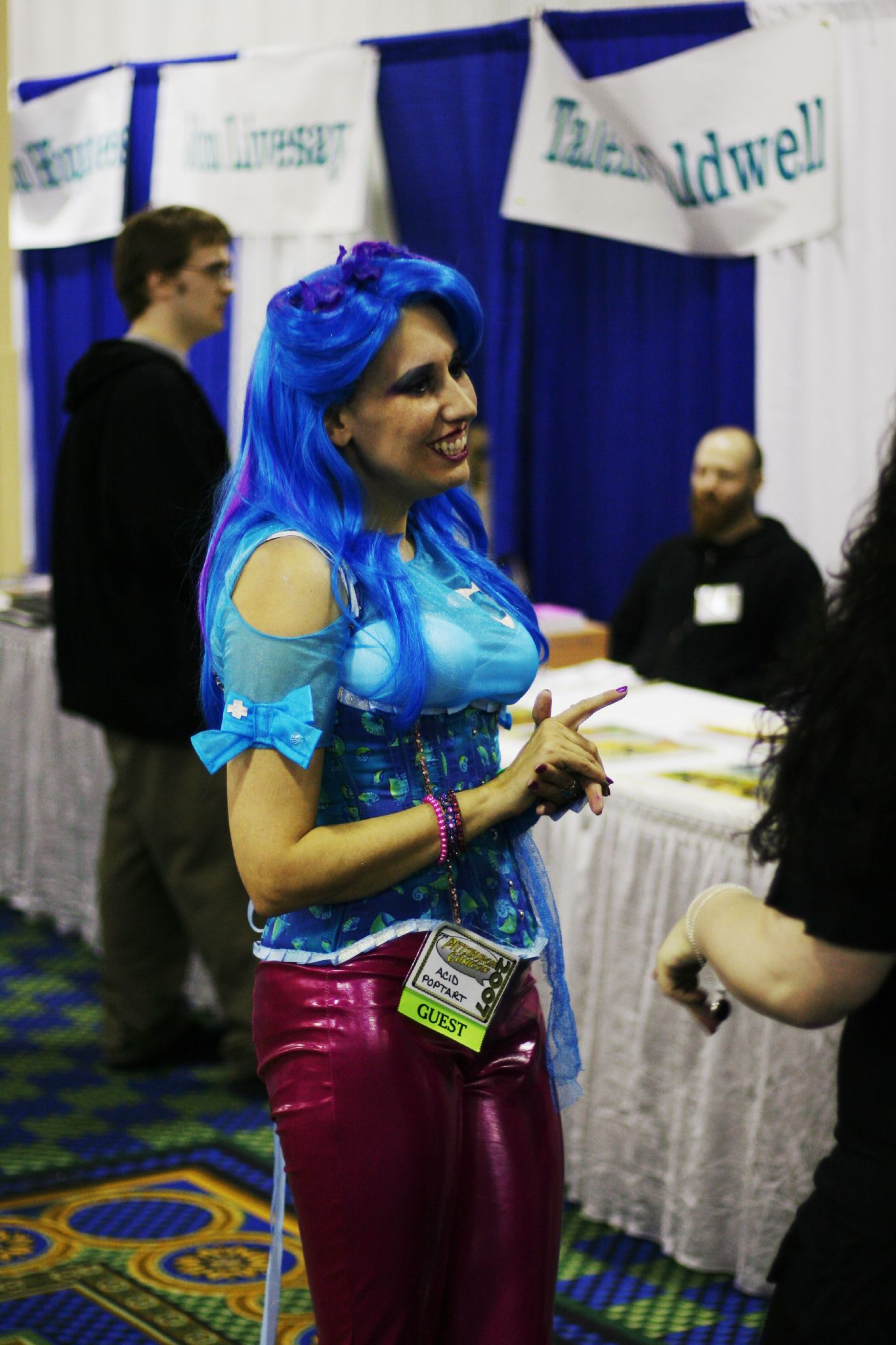
Cosplay

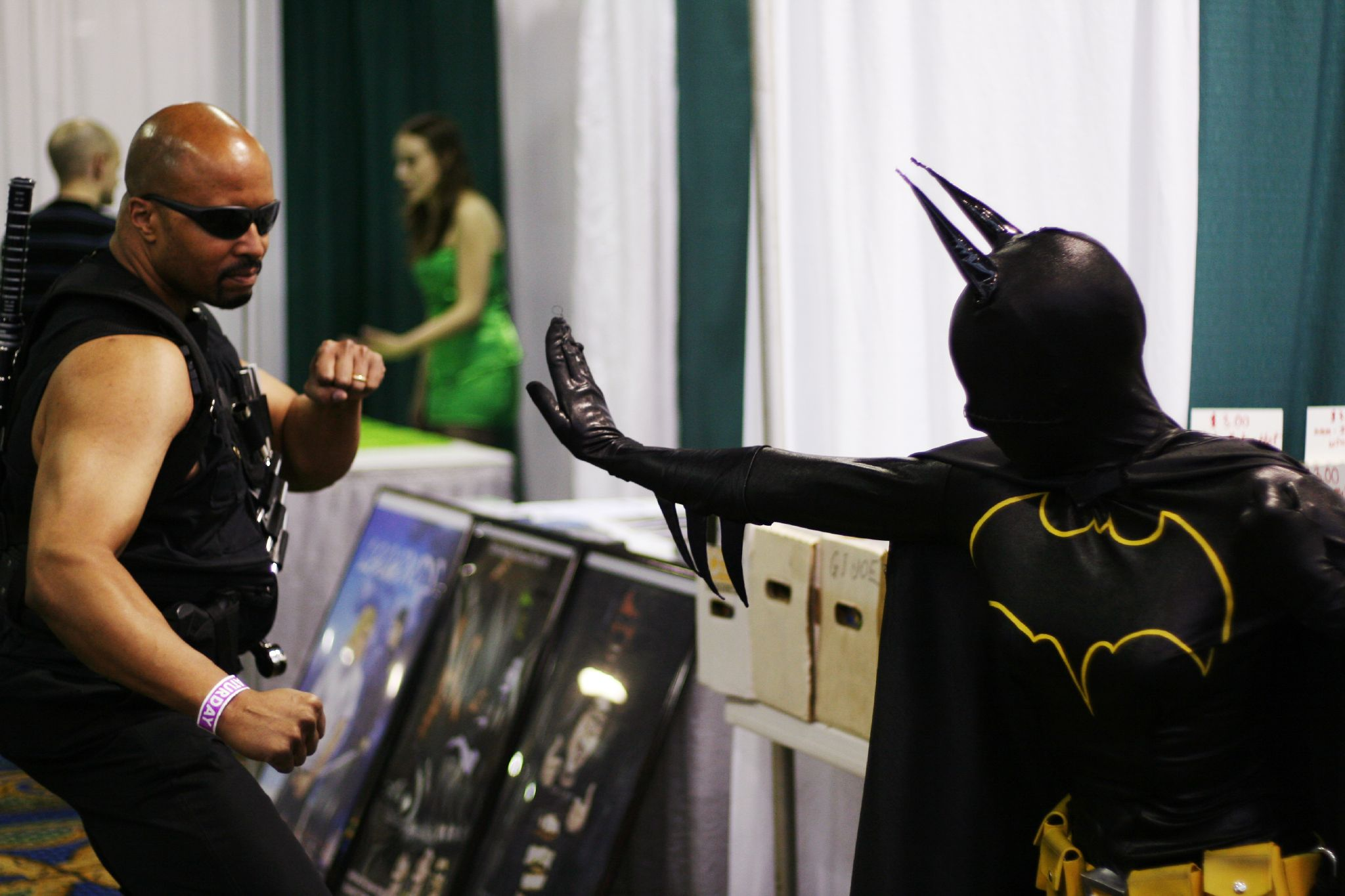
Batgirl versus Blade

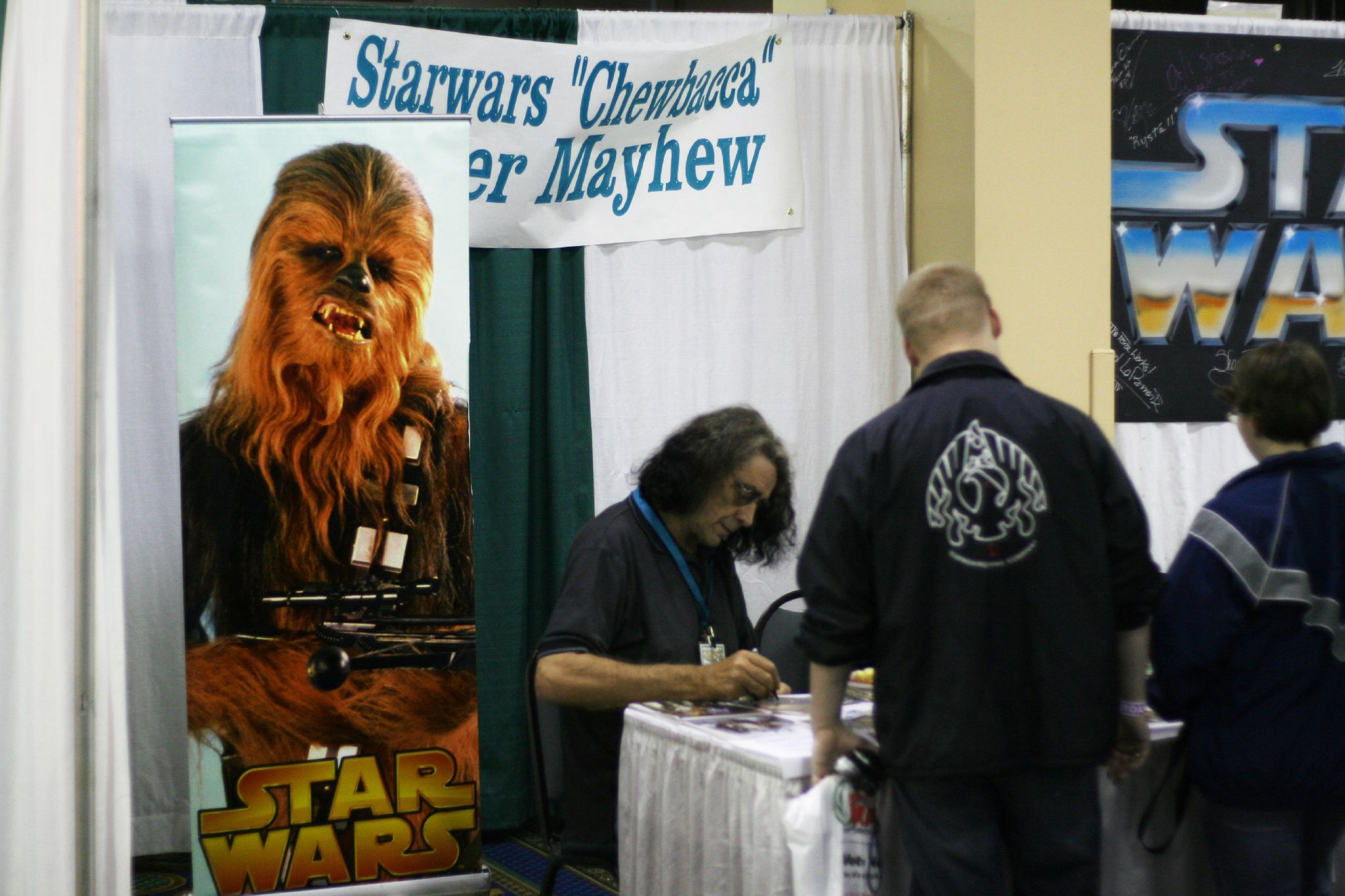
Peter Mayhew at the 2007 Pittsburgh Comicon.

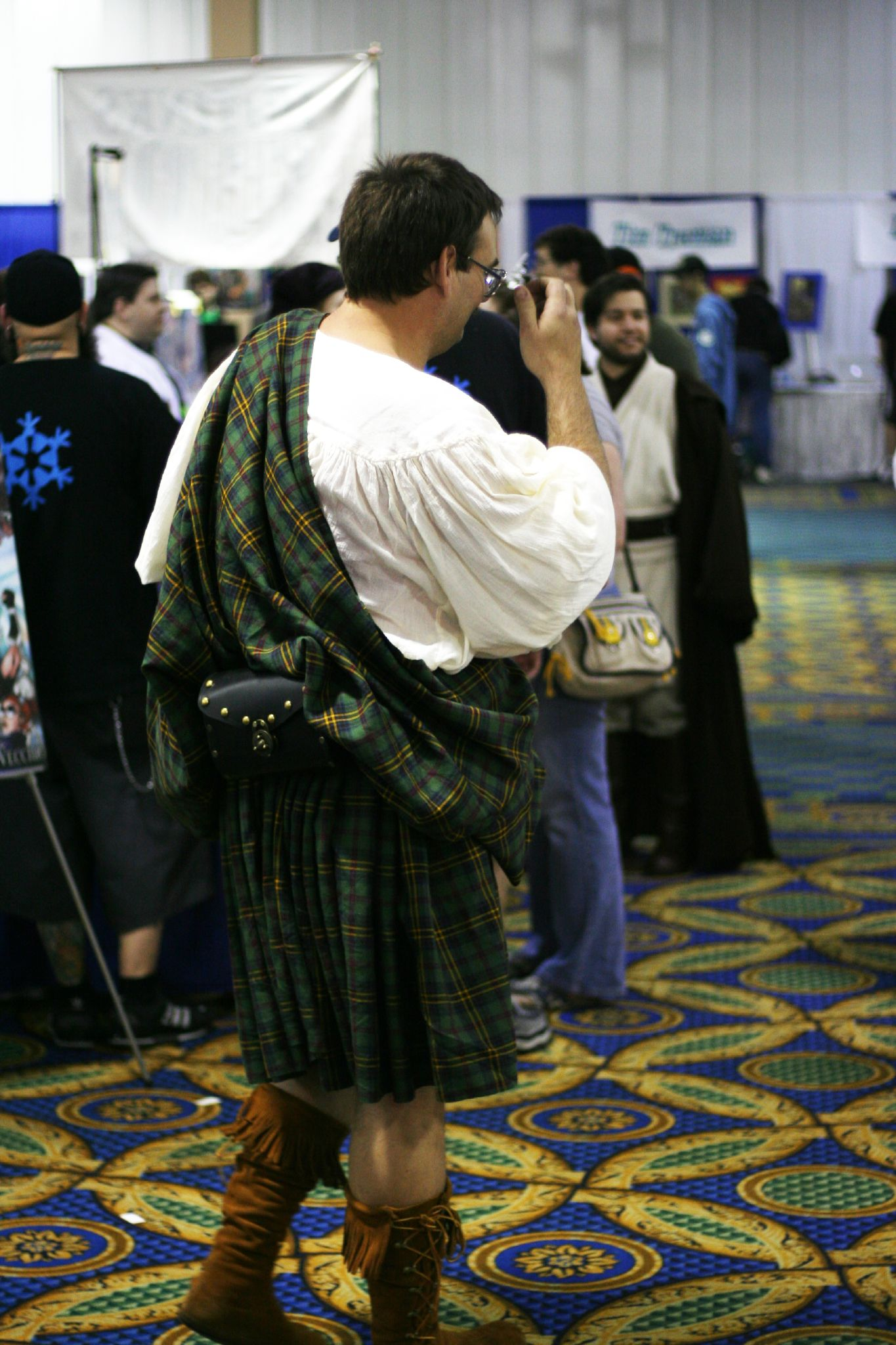
A kilted cosplayer

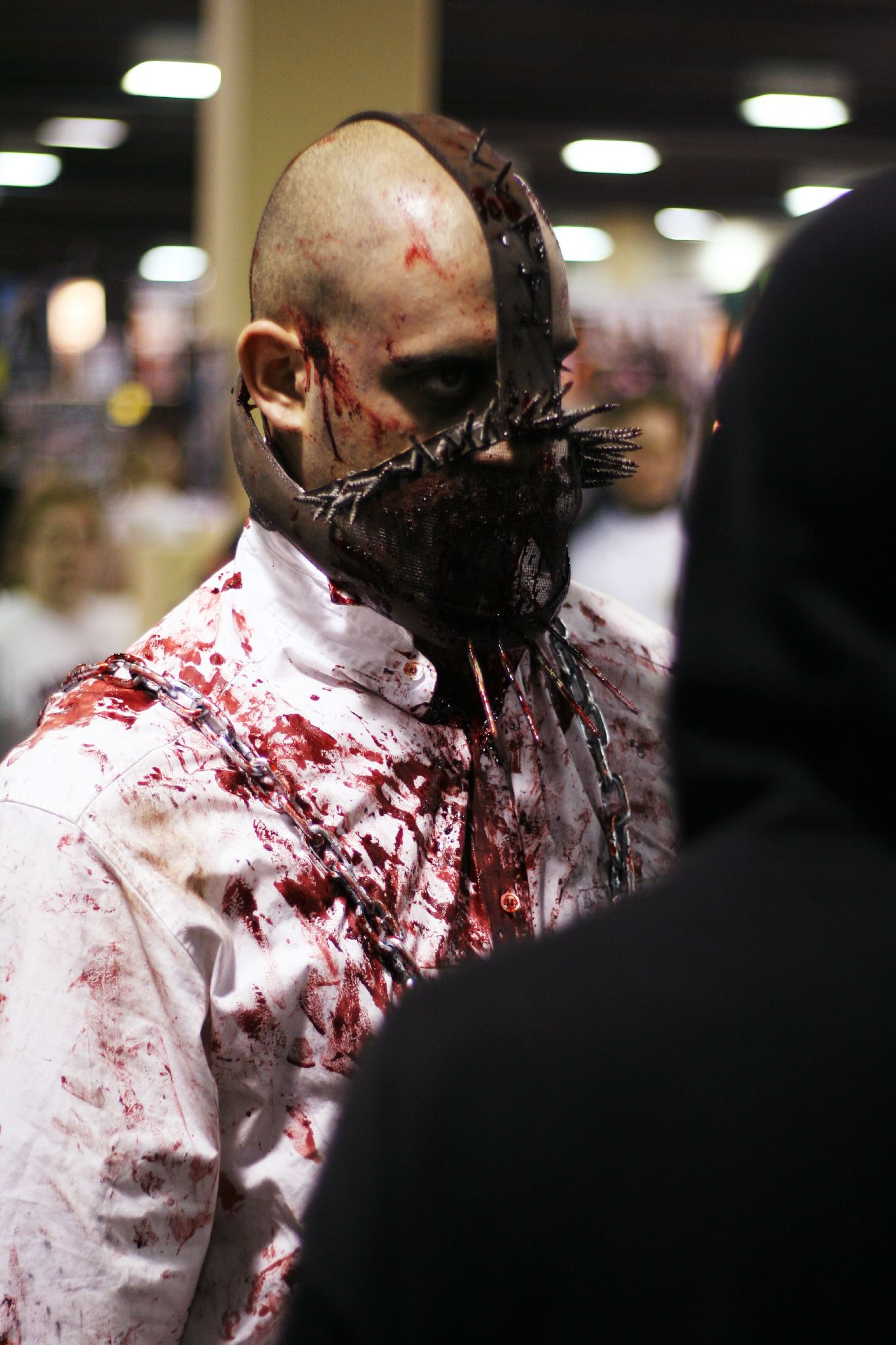
Bloody dude

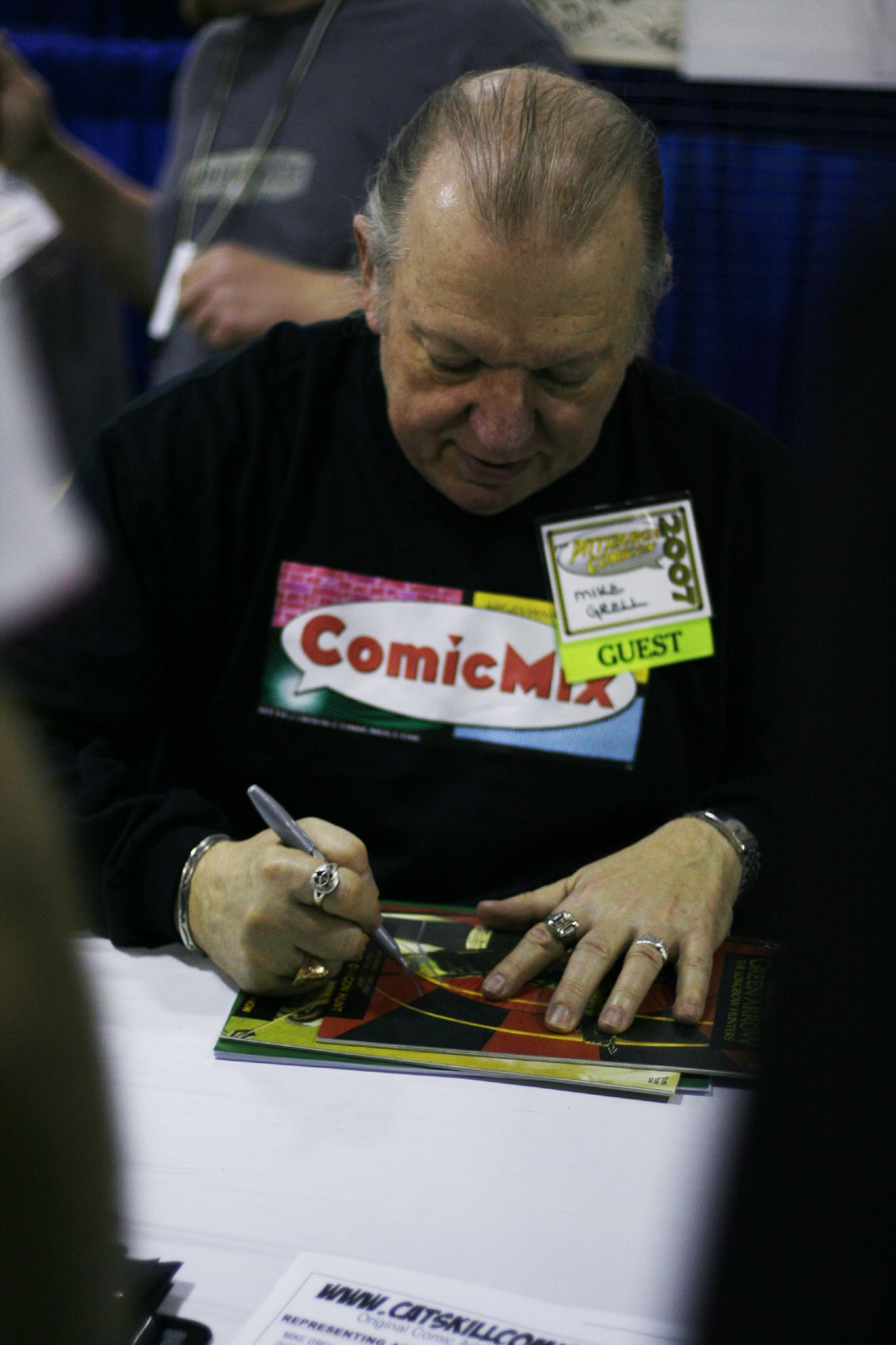
Mike Grell in 2007.

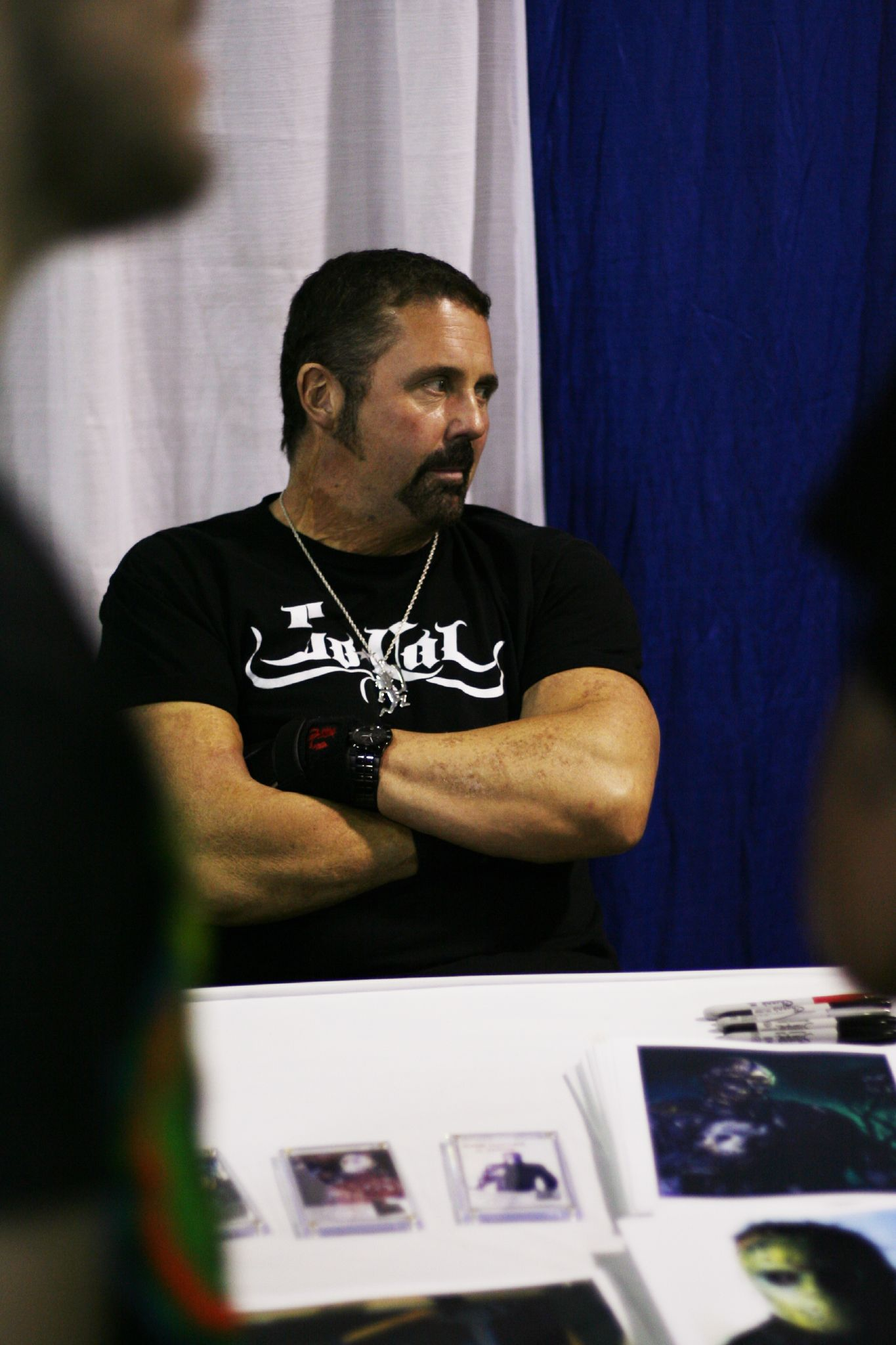
Kane Hodder in 2007

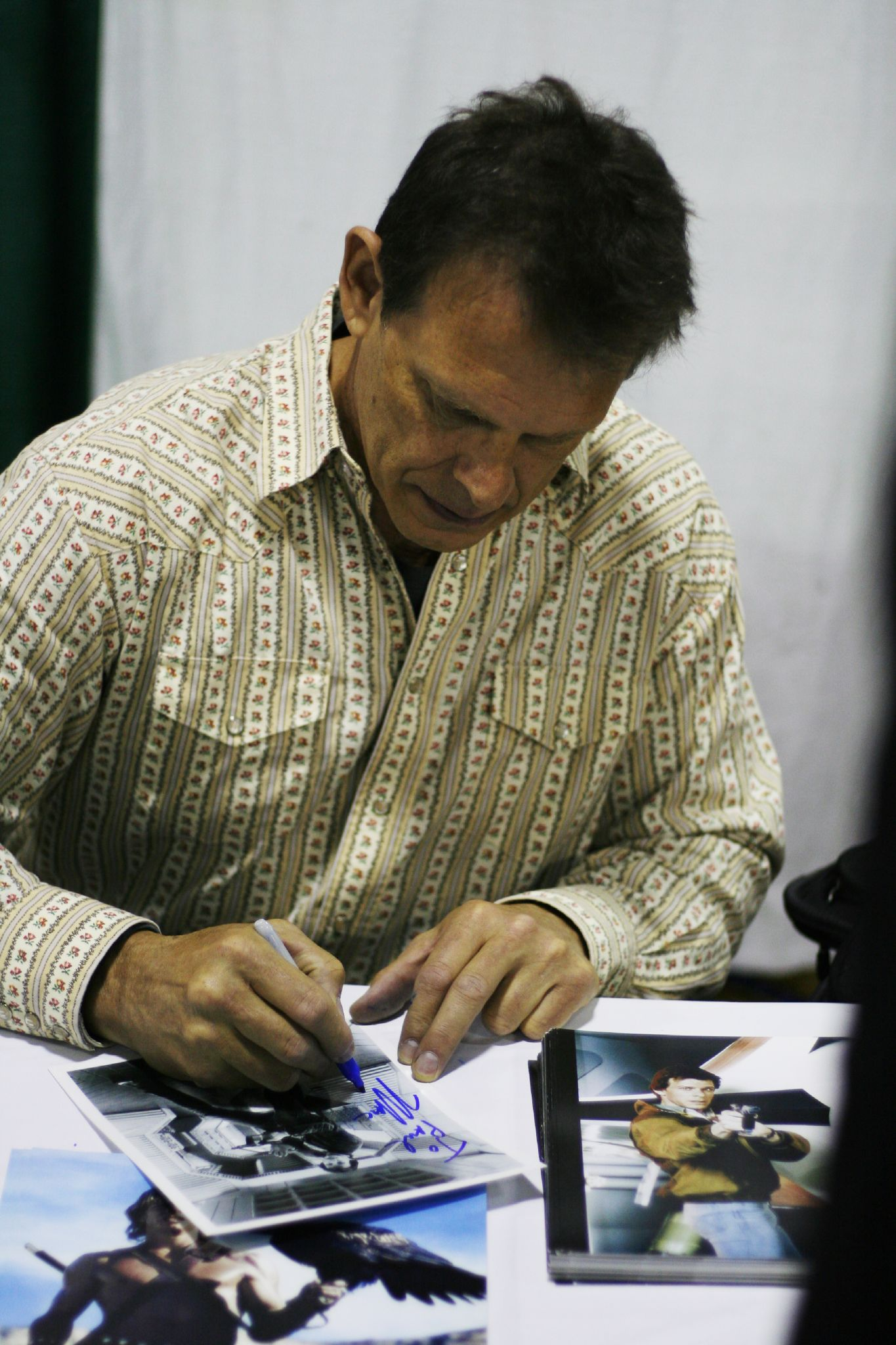
Marc Singer in 2007

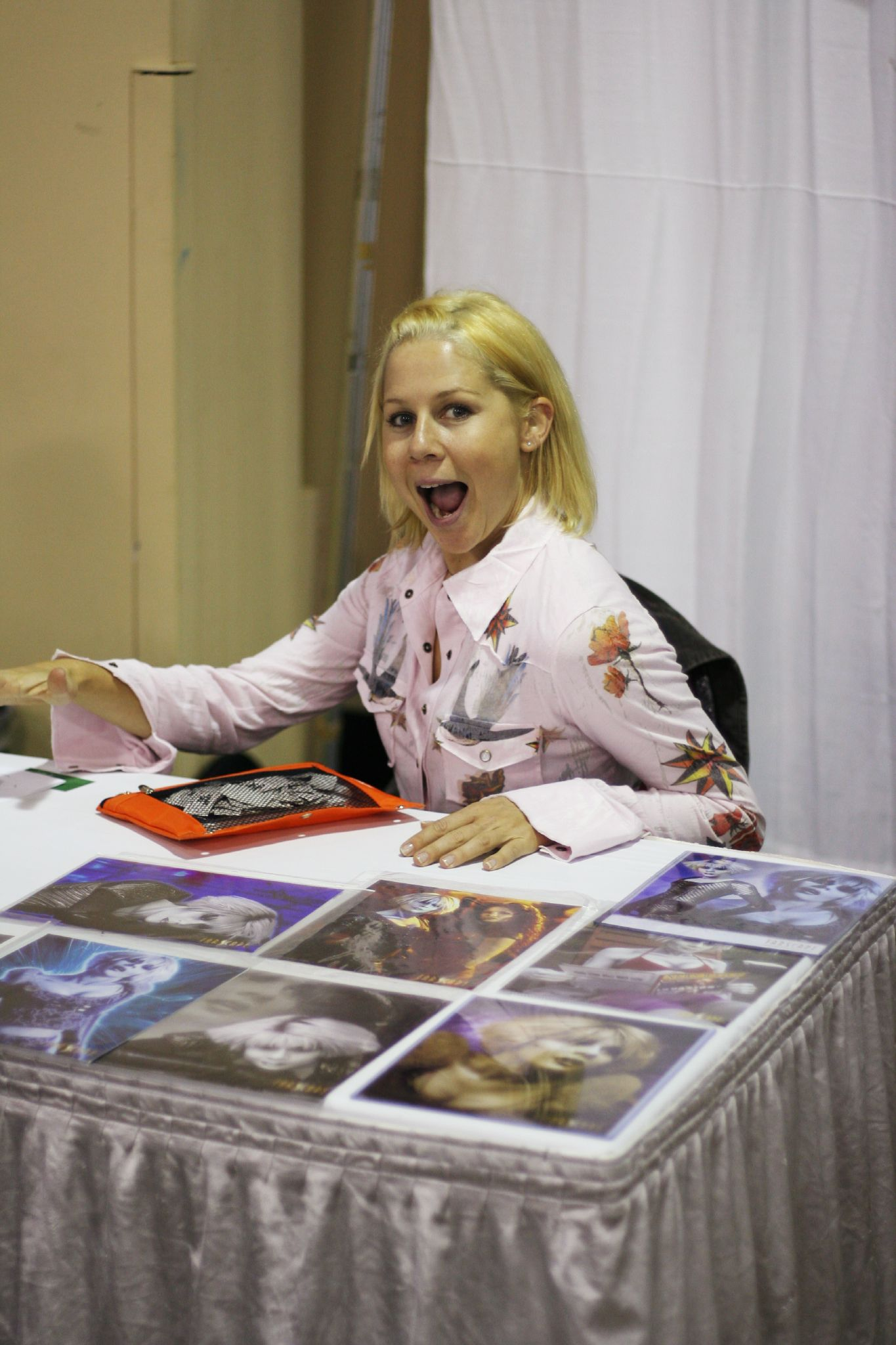
Gigi Edgley in 2007
