= List of The Ricky Gervais Show (TV series) episodes =

The Ricky Gervais Show is a cartoon series produced for and broadcast by HBO. The series is an animated version of the popular British audio podcasts and audiobooks of the same name, which feature Ricky Gervais and Stephen Merchant (creators of The Office and Extras), along with colleague and friend Karl Pilkington, talking about various subjects behind the microphone. The TV show consists of past audio recordings of these unscripted "pointless conversations," with animation drawn in a style similar to classic era Hanna-Barbera cartoons, presenting jokes and situations in a literal context. The animated Ricky Gervais Show has aired three 13-episode seasons since it premiered in the United States on February 19, 2010. The second season started on January 14, 2011, and a third season began airing in April 2012.

There were some plans for a possible fourth season as well, which would have used newly recorded audio, but this was shelved. On June 16, 2012, Ricky Gervais announced that the show will not get a fourth season in the foreseeable future. "My worry is that as we've used up all the best material we'd have to record hours and hours of new stuff and it might ruin the naivety of the whole thing. Never say never though, like The Office. But certainly for now", explained Gervais.

The first season was released on region 2 DVD on July 19, 2010. The region 1 (North American) DVD was released on January 4, 2011.

== Series overview ==
| Series | Episodes | Originally released | |
| Series | Episodes | First released | Last released |
|---|---|---|---|
| 1 | 13 | 19 February 2010 | 21 May 2010 |
| 2 | 13 | 14 January 2011 | 15 April 2011 |
| 3 | 13 | 20 April 2012 | 13 July 2012 |

== Episodes ==
=== Season 1 (2010) ===
Note: All episodes in this season were directed by Craig Kellman.

| No. overall | No. in season | Title | Storyboard by | Original release date | U.S. viewers (millions) |
|---|---|---|---|---|---|
| 1 | 1 | "Space Monkey" | Greg Miller | February 19, 2010 | N/A |
Topics include Karl's view on modern technology, his take on population control, the first monkey in space, and paranormal activity (or "weird stuff", as Karl puts it), including a cursed tankard, flies and a condom, and a spooky shopping list.
| 2 | 2 | "Knob at Night" | Dan O'Connor | February 26, 2010 | N/A |
Topics include a lion-mutilation story in Cambodia; what to know about donating to charities; public nudity; violence in animal sanctuaries; sexual aids for men and women.
| 3 | 3 | "Charity" | David 'Pez' Hofmann | March 5, 2010 | N/A |
Topics include Karl’s theory on a reverse-aging process; charitable gifts for families in need; the merits of space travel; a choice of superpowers; personal mottos. Also: a “Monkey News” segment about a Moscow TV station.
| 4 | 4 | "Dolphins" | Jake Castorena | March 12, 2010 | N/A |
Karl admits that he is getting a face rub at a spa; The customs of undocumented tribes in New Guinea; Ricky and Karl’s trip to an antiquities store; A fan’s email warns of dangerous dolphins.
| 5 | 5 | "Glass Houses" | Mike Stern | March 19, 2010 | 0.184 |
Karl answers questions from fans; Karl deciphers the true meaning of sayings; Karl's New Year's resolution; "Monkey News."
| 6 | 6 | "Cobblers" | Cindy Morrow | March 26, 2010 | N/A |
A fan asks Karl which body part he could live without; fan mail questions for Karl; "Monkey News."
| 7 | 7 | "The Diary" | Peter Browngardt | April 9, 2010 | N/A |
Ricky and Stephen read passages from Karl's diary; nicknames; "Monkey News."
| 8 | 8 | "Nuts" | Chris Reccardi | April 16, 2010 | N/A |
Karl answers fan emails, Stephen reads more from Karl's diary; Karl discusses how he would redesign animals; "Monkey News."
| 9 | 9 | "The Jockey" | John D. Anderson | April 23, 2010 | 0.092 |
Questions for Karl; Karl's diary; Monkey News.
| 10 | 10 | "The Fight" | Dan O'Connor | April 30, 2010 | 0.179 |
Karl discusses his teaching methods; questions for Karl; Karl's diary; Monkey News.
| 11 | 11 | "Beetles" | David 'Pez' Hofmann | May 7, 2010 | 0.138 |
Karl gives advice for Valentine's Day. Karl imagines what it would be like to be a beetle; Karl's diary; final Monkey News.
| 12 | 12 | "Noises" | Jake Castorena | May 14, 2010 | N/A |
Inside the Actors Studio questionnaire; Karl discusses the afterlife; Karl's diary.
| 13 | 13 | "Freaks" | Kurt Nielsen | May 21, 2010 | N/A |
Inside the Actors Studio questionnaire; Karl's diary; Karl's top 5 freaks.

=== Season 2 (2011) ===
Note: From episode 14 until the end of the series, all episodes were directed by Dan Fraga.

| No. overall | No. in season | Title | Storyboard by | Original release date | U.S. viewers (millions) |
|---|---|---|---|---|---|
| 14 | 1 | "Clive Warren" | Dan O'Connor | January 14, 2011 | 0.280 |
Karl tells Ricky and Stephen about his pitch of a movie starring "Clive Warren" and Rebecca De Mornay. Stephen reads more pages from Karl's diary, revealing Karl's dislike of camping in Australia and his habit of saving insects from falling into a swimming pool.
| 15 | 2 | "Doppelganger" | David 'Pez' Hofmann | January 21, 2011 | 0.209 |
Karl discusses what his doppelganger would be like. Ricky gives Karl a riddle. Karl and Stephen say what they do not like about Ricky's cat. Stephen discusses his holiday in Rio, where he went for Carnival.
| 16 | 3 | "The Fly" | Joey Adams | January 28, 2011 | 0.197 |
The trio discuss animals and diseases; evolution; a fly that is supposedly a pet; Karl's diary.
| 17 | 4 | "Onion" | Spencer Laudiero | February 4, 2011 | 0.173 |
Ricky gives Karl some animal facts. Karl ponders the question of whether you control your brain, or your brain controls you. From Karl's diary we investigate the curious case of the invisible Chinese man, why blind people have affairs, the feasibility and usefulness of putting a mirror on the Moon, and birthdays.
| 18 | 5 | "Insects" | Shavonne Cherry | February 11, 2011 | 0.131 |
Karl shares his thoughts on why insects are so deserving of his attention. Karl talks about his disappointment when learning about a killer octopus; what he would change in crabs; more stuff about insects. Karl's diary is also mostly about insects.
| 19 | 6 | "Kidneys" | Dan O'Connor | February 18, 2011 | 0.267 |
Karl talks about having been rushed to hospital. He says that kidney stones were found and he had a catheter put into his penis. Karl ponders a phenomenon; Karl's diary; and more.
| 20 | 7 | "Night Club" | David 'Pez' Hofmann | March 4, 2011 | 0.258 |
Karl ponders height extremes when he learns that one of his new fans is actor Warwick Davis. Stephen talks about a night when he and his friends visited a nightclub in London. The bouncer refused them entry due to them not having any girls with them. Karl's diary is about his hospital visit for his kidney and a TV documentary in which he believes a monkey acted as a toll taker on a bridge.
| 21 | 8 | "Future" | Joey Adams | March 11, 2011 | 0.264 |
Karl makes several predictions about humanity's distant future, including his belief that everyone will be ugly, that we will be physically weaker, the little finger will cease to exist, trousers will cease to be produced and we will blend all of our food. Stephen says that if he knew it were the last day of Earth's existence, he would smash up a bar and kill a person. Karl says that he would kick a duck up the arse.
| 22 | 9 | "Natural History" | Spencer Laudiero | March 18, 2011 | N/A |
Ricky talks about undiscovered species. He talks about a drawing he did when he was in his early teens of an animal which consisted of a lion's head, a gorilla's arms, the body of a rhinoceros, the tail of a scorpion and the legs of a cheetah. Karl says that his design for an animal would consist of the head of an owl, an armadillo's body on a slug base and with peacock feathers. Karl talks about having met a man who had drawn a design for a car which enabled defecating while driving. Karl says his father had a friend who kept a monkey as his pet.
| 23 | 10 | "Leg Rubber" | Derek Evanick | March 25, 2011 | N/A |
Karl discusses his childhood memories of having thousands of Tic Tacs in his house, given to his father by a friend. A discussion about curing blindness in mice trials. Karl tells of his visit to a "professional leg rubber", who tells Karl ridiculous things and charges £48 for half an hour. Karl talks about his visit to a Harley Street doctor's surgery for a medical. In the waiting room, he was surprised to find Boyz among the magazines. He looked through it, thinking it might enlighten him about the appeal of homosexual sex. He found it to be very penis-focused and contained many innuendoes.
| 24 | 11 | "Mrs. Battersby" | Dan O'Connor | April 1, 2011 | N/A |
Karl talks about the brain having two sides and "sensing" when trouble is near. He recounts having eaten a beetle, having been lost in London and having talked to a ghost in Cornwall. Karl then reveals that the ghost encounter was something his mother told him, rather than a personal memory of his. He talks about his aunt not wanting double glazing. He says that if he was a manager, he would sack staff who were absent due to thick snow impeding their route to work. Karl's Diary includes his belief that Martians are more advanced than us because their days are longer, allowing for greater productivity. Another of his diary entries is about a pub whose new owners have been criticised for barring a regular customer, who is a horse.
| 25 | 12 | "Art" | David 'Pez' Hofmann | April 8, 2011 | N/A |
The trio discuss art, including Marcel Duchamp's Fountain and Damien Hirst's The Physical Impossibility of Death in the Mind of Someone Living as well as sculptures. Karl talks about a tricycle-riding fat woman nicknamed Miss Piggy who lived on the same estate as him. Ricky says that adaptations of literature and film can be improved by featuring the Muppets. Karl says that his favourite films are The Elephant Man, Kes and Mission: Impossible 2. Karl talks about his fondness of whistling, and Ricky says that he finds it annoying.
| 26 | 13 | "Munchies" | Patrick Johnson | April 15, 2011 | N/A |
Ricky asks Karl if he would give up his real life to live in a virtual reality isolation tank. Karl discusses his thoughts about problems, holidays and happiness. Whilst recounting having met an older man on holiday, Karl finally laughs.

=== Season 3 (2012) ===
| No. overall | No. in season | Title | Storyboard by | Original release date | U.S. viewers (millions) |
|---|---|---|---|---|---|
| 27 | 1 | "Bryan's Brain" | Joey Adams | April 20, 2012 | N/A |
Karl has another movie idea; this one starring Tom Cruise playing a struggling actor called Bryan who looks like Ted Danson ... in the body of Cruise.
| 28 | 2 | "Comic Relief" | Alec Megibben | April 27, 2012 | N/A |
Karl talks to Stephen and Ricky about why he has not made a will or married. The trio talk about various charitable causes and their attitudes to them.
| 29 | 3 | "Armed Forces" | Stephen Sawran | May 4, 2012 | N/A |
Karl explains why he would like to join the Army and recounts his most harrowing acts of bravery. He says that his brother was beaten up by German women whilst in the Army and stationed in Germany, before being kicked out for different reasons.
| 30 | 4 | "Room 102" | Howie Perry; Scott O'Brien; Brian Hatfield; Shellie O'Brien; Darin McGowan | May 11, 2012 | N/A |
In an altered version of Room 101, Karl decides which things that annoy him belong in "Room 102".
| 31 | 5 | "Karl's Day" | Sean Pendergrass | May 18, 2012 | N/A |
Karl describes to Ricky and Stephen an average day in his life.
| 32 | 6 | "The English" | Anne Walker Farrell | May 25, 2012 | N/A |
Karl, Ricky and Stephen talk about what it means to be English.
| 33 | 7 | "Law & Order" | Christian Lignan; Mark Ackland; Dave Thomas; Riccardo Durante | June 1, 2012 | N/A |
Ricky, Stephen and Karl talk about capital punishment, the Ten Commandments and hostage negotiation.
| 34 | 8 | "Medicine" | Alec Megibben | June 8, 2012 | N/A |
Karl shares his thoughts on medical advancements and how being sick makes him feel better.
| 35 | 9 | "Earth" | Nick Bertonazzi Jr. | June 15, 2012 | N/A |
Karl contemplates the beginning of the universe, evolution, recycling, and toilets abroad.
| 36 | 10 | "Society" | Derek Evanick | June 22, 2012 | N/A |
Karl, Ricky and Stephen discuss the laws of society and civil rights.
| 37 | 11 | "Wartime" | Anne Walker Farrell | June 29, 2012 | N/A |
Karl ponders the meaning of popular wartime expressions and what life is like for a soldier's spouse.
| 38 | 12 | "World Cup" | Andrew Dickman & Alec Megibben; Justin Nichols | July 6, 2012 | N/A |
Ricky and Stephen reminisce about watching the World Cup together in a hotel room, and the awkward situation of sharing the bed.
| 39 | 13 | "The Year" | Joey Adams & Anne Walker Farrell | July 13, 2012 | N/A |
Karl picks his highlight of the year gone past. The final chapter of Karl's diary.

== See also ==
- The Ricky Gervais Show (TV series) – the animated TV show
- The Ricky Gervais Show – the podcast and audio book series that the TV show is based on
  - List of The Ricky Gervais Show episodes – list of podcasts and audio books
