= Podfather =

Podfather may refer to:

- Adam Curry, internet entrepreneur
- Max Friedman, internet entrepreneur
- Brian Redban, American comedian credited as co-host of Kill Tony and original producer of The Joe Rogan Experience
- Bill Simmons, American sports journalist credited with increasing the popularity of the format
- Jon Rubinstein, iPod developer
- The Podfather, series four of The Ricky Gervais Show
