= Project Fanboy =

Comic book news website

- Website type: Online news, comic book and magazine
- Owner: Independent
- Creators: Stephen Jondrew & Scott Williams
- Website: www.projectfanboy.com
- Launched: 2005
- Current status: offline

Project Fanboy (PF) was an American website that publishes news, interviews and reviews about the American comic book industry. In addition, the site hosted comic book fan-voted awards. It was founded by Stephen Jondrew and Scott Williams in the fall of 2005 as an alternative site that covered mainstream comic book news, but also promoted smaller independent works.

== History ==
The Project Fanboy website was launched in 2005 as an independently run promoter of comic books and creators in the comic book industry. A little known site in its first three years, it eventually began publishing interviews and reviews of independent comic books in 2008. The site garnered little interest until May 2008, with the introduction of the annual Project Fanboy Awards.

At the 2009 MegaCon comic book convention the winners of the 2008 Project Fanboy Awards were announced. The awards sparked controversy amongst comic book fans with the announcement of Jim Balent's company Broadsword Comics receiving three of the twenty five awards, for their publication Tarot: Witch of the Black Rose. Websites such as Chris's Invincible Super-Blog published sarcastic praise concerning the outcome of the awards while other websites such as Panels on Pages spoke highly of the publication which is quoted as saying, "...making it easy to see how it walked away with three of the twenty-five awards at Project Fanboy this past March...".

In the 55th issue of Tarot: Witch of the Black Rose, Broadsword colorist, Holly Golightly appeared adorned in only the three Project Fanboy Awards the company received, again sparking the attention of bloggers and internet users. ComicBitsOnline spoke with Holly GoLightly after the awards ceremony and showcased a photo of the Broadsword team accepting the Project Fanboy Awards in the interview the site published.

Project Fanboy seemed to have changed URLs between February 2012 and March 2013, transferring to fanboybuzz.com. The last viable capture occurred in April 2014.

=== Fanboy Buzz ===
In 2010 the site started its official comic book podcast, the Fanboy Buzz. In 2011 the podcast partnered with the website Comic Collector Live, making Fanboy Buzz the official podcast of both Project Fanboy and Comic Collector Live.

In February 2012 Project Fanboy and the Fanboy Buzz sites merged and continued all operations under the Fanboy Buzz banner.

On November 10, 2012, DC Comics artist Ethan Van Sciver announced his intentions of joining the Fanboy Buzz podcast as a host on the show via his Facebook and Twitter pages. Van Sciver joined Fanboy Buzz hosts Stephen Jondrew, Scott Williams, Jean Sebastien Heroux and Steve Boyd as a full-time host of the Fanboy Buzz podcast starting with episode 142 of the show.

=== Usage as a comic book resource ===
Comic book editor, writer, and Project Fanboy columnist, Steven D. Forbes is commonly known for his columns at the site, where he offered advice for aspiring writers as well as offering his professional editorial thoughts on samples of work sent to him by his readers. An established columnist on the site since August 2008, Forbes was interviewed on Jazma Online and has been referenced on sites such as Newsarama, by columnists Randal Jarrell, and Tyler James. Forbes has also been spoken highly of on Today.com/2008/09/27/a-site-for-the-comic-geek-in-all-of-us/ by Stacey David, author of the Bluewater Publishing mini-series GearZ.

In May 2009, the site began being used by the industry as a resource when interviews the site conducted with The Original Nutty Funsters author, Stephanie O'Donnell and Chumble Spuzz author, Ethan Nicolle were cited by the comic book news website Broken Frontier, as a primer to "inter-reviews" they conducted with the same authors.

The site has also appeared as a reference on the Internet Movie Database for an interview they conducted with Teenage Mutant Ninja Turtles co-creator, Peter Laird.

=== In the news and other media ===
Articles about the Project Fanboy website have appeared on Indy Comics Today as well as the e-newsletter for the Diamond Comic Distributors owned, Diamond International Galleries. Widely known for its reviews of Indy titles, excerpts of the site's reviews have been quoted on the back of numerous trade paper back comics and appeared on comic book news sites such as Comic Book Resources, Newsarama, and Comics Bulletin. The comic book awards the site is host to are listed as one of the main events for the MegaCon Convention in an article on the Comic Book Conventions website and are currently in their second year.

==== Project Fanboy Awards ====
The Project Fanboy Awards (PFA), which is a fan voted competition similar to the Eagle Awards, was a competition where fans decided their favorite writers and artists among several other categories. Geoff Johns' inclusion in a list of the "Top 20 Comic Book Writers of All Time" in an article on Mania.com, was influenced at least in part by the 2008 award he won from the site as "Best Writer".

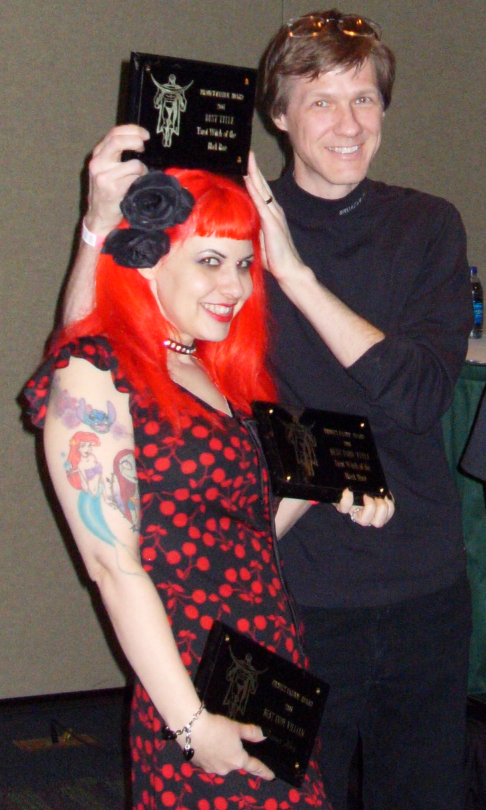
Comic book creator Jim Balent and Holly Golightly at the MegaCon Comic Book Convention in Orlando, April 20, 2008

The PFA began as a monthly honor for deserving fan sites. The Green Lantern Corps fan site was the first winner when it received the award for February, 2008. In May 2008 however, the Project Fanboy Award was restructured and slated as an annual event and dubbed the Project Fanboy Awards(plural). After the restructuring of the awards, they now consisted of twenty-five different categories in which fans are encouraged to nominate and vote on via the Project Fanboy website.

In its first year, nominations in all categories were accepted until November 1, at which point voting began and lasted through the end of December. The same voting and nomination schedule as used for the 2008 awards also applies to following years.

===== 2008 categories =====
Best Writer; Best Artist; Best Title; Best Indy Writer; Best Indy Artist	Best Indy Title; Best Comic Book to Movie Adaptation; Best Comic Book to Movie Adaptation: Actor; Best Comic Book to Movie Adaptation: Actress; Best Character	Best Hero; Best Indy Villain; Best Indy Character; Best Indy Hero; Best Villain	Best Storyline; Best Publisher; Best Comic Book Related Novel; Best Graphic Novel; Best Black & White Title	Best Rookie Title; Best Comic Book News Source; Best Webcomic; Best Comic Book Website; Best Fansite

Winners of the 2008 awards were announced Sunday, March 1, 2009, at the MegaCon comic book convention in Orlando, Florida. Winners were given commemorative award plaques descriptive in the category for which they were won. Writers from the comic book website Newsarama attended and covered the awards ceremony. Jim and Holly Balent of Broadsword Comics were also present for the ceremony and executive editor of DC Comics, Dan DiDio accepted the award plaque for Geoff Johns for Best Writer.

Following the announcement of the 2008 award winners; in March, 2009 the awards categories were amended, removing the three Best Comic Book to Movie Adaptation categories.
