= Comic Geek Speak =

Podcast about comics

- Genre: Audio Podcast
- Language: English

Cast and voices
- Hosted by: Bryan Deemer; Peter Rios; Shane Kelly; Adam "Murd" Murdough; Brian "Pants" Christman

Technical specifications
- Audio format: MP3

Publication
- Original release: March 2005
- Updates: Monday – Friday

Comic Geek Speak (CGS) is a comics audio podcast that focuses on current mainstream and small-press comic books, featuring creator interviews, reviews, commentary on the comic book craft and industry, comic-related movie discussions and more. Bryan Deemer and Peter Rios began the Comic Geek Speak podcast in 2005 and the original roster of hosts expanded to include Shane Kelly, Kevin Moyer, Jamie D., Matt, Adam "Murd" Murdough, and Brian "Pants" Christman, friends from their local comic shop, Golden Eagle Comics in Reading, Pa. Other hosts would join later as replacements, including Chris Eberle, and Ian Levenstein. The hosts express their individual opinions in an informal way that many fans think resembles a discussion between friends hanging out at home or at the local comic shop, giving the podcast a unique point of view.

Comic Geek Speak has interviewed over 400 creators including Stan Lee, Terry Moore, Jamal Igle, Marv Wolfman, Gene Colan, Dave Sim, Geoff Johns, Matt Fraction, Joe Kubert, Freddie Williams II, Paul Pope, Jonathan Hickman, Denis Kitchen, Sean McKeever, and David Petersen, among many others. Other shows have included top 5 discussions, debates, interviews with retailers, and spotlights on specific characters or publishers. The CGS hosts also regularly visit comic conventions, giving day-to-day overviews of their experiences as attendees, interviewing creators as they promote their upcoming projects, talking to listeners, and even moderating or participating on panels.

CGS's motto is "We Are Uniting the World's Mightiest Heroes One Listener at a Time". The motto stems from a listener contest, won by Chris Whittington. The podcast engages in interactive communication with its listeners via email, voice mail, and its own forum. Listeners can ask questions, suggest ideas for future episodes, participate in contests and are occasionally given the chance to guest-hosts a show that touches on a specific topic of interest. Peter Rios has since left the show, he is the first Geek to officially leave CGS. He has since begun his own successful podcast: The Daily Rios.

== Episodes and segments ==

The CGS crew release episodes Monday through Friday. Over 1,230 episodes have been released, ranging from regular shows on current comic books and comic events, to more focused discussions. These discussions include:

- Book of the Month – A reading club designed to get listeners interested in and exposed to books they may not have been exposed to otherwise. The categories of books rotate from month to month, Marvel, DC, Indie, Manga, and Host Choice.
- Indie Publisher Spotlight – Showcases various independent and small press comics, as well as the companies and creators behind these titles.
- Let's Talk Shop – A discussion about comics and the industry with different retailers and comic book store owners.
- Off The Rack – A discussion of three comics (one Marvel, one DC, and one independent) that the Geeks choose during Previews episodes. They all read and discuss the issues.
- Stump the Rios – A trivia contest. Listeners submit three trivia questions, one for DC, one for Marvel, and one for Independent comics. If host, Peter Rios, cannot answer at least one of the three questions, the submitter will win a prize. The rules for Stump the Rios, came about because Peter was once asked three questions all about Scrooge McDuck, and so after this the rules were set that it had to be one Marvel, one DC, and one Independent Comic. Stump the Rios came to an end with Peter Rios leaving the show.
- Top 5 – Hosts list their five favorites in a variety of categories, such as animated movies, villains, and cliffhangers.
- Smarty Pants – The idea for a TV trivia contest featuring co-host Brian Christman was initiated by Matt when he coined the term "Iron the Pants," the original name for the contest. Listeners submit three trivia questions dealing with American TV shows from the 1950s, 1960s and 1970s. Pants must successfully answer at least one question or he is considered "Ironed." No prizes are awarded. The name of the contest was later changed to "Smarty Pants" to match the segment's theme music, "Smarty Pants" performed by First Choice.
- Muddle The Murd – This segment takes the place of "Stump The Rios" in regular rotation. Here, listeners submit three questions to try and defeat Adam Murdough. Each question must fit under the criteria of one DC, one Marvel and one Independent. The twist comes with the second set of criteria: one question must come from the Golden Age of comics (anytime before 1970), one from the Silver and Bronze Age (1970-2000), and finally, one from present day (2000-today). If Adam Murdough is unable to answer at least one question correctly he is considered "muddled," and the contestant wins a prize.
- In one of the episodes Brian Christman interviews DiDio

== Spin-off podcasts ==
The show has led to several spin-offs, including:

- The Crisis Tapes - Hosted by Peter Rios and Adam Murdough. Each episode, the duo go in-depth, issue by issue, into DC's Crisis on Infinite Earths, and occasionally delve into its tie-in issues and related works.
- Footnotes – Where the hosts of CGS take an in-depth, page by page look at some classic comic series and discuss them.
- World of Toys – Hosted by Shane Kelly and Brian "Pants" Christman. A discussion of newly released toys as well as an in depth look at the toys of yesterday.
- Murd's Time Bubble – Hosted by Adam "Murd" Murdough. Being behind in his current comics reading by at least eight years, Murd discusses the comics that he is catching up on and his thoughts on the stories.
- Jamie's Essentials – Hosted by Jamie D. An extensive look at each Marvel character, their "must read" stories, and how they got to where they are now in current continuity.

== Convention tour ==
Comic Geek Speak has had booths at several comic conventions around the United States, and has participated in panel discussions on podcasting. It was the official comics podcast for New York Comic Con in 2006, for Pittsburgh Comicon, and Fan Expo Canada in 2009. The podcast was also featured at sixth annual San Diego Comic-Con.

== Super Show ==
Comic Geek Speak held their first ever live recording in January 2006, to commemorate the show's 100th episode. The live recording was held at Golden Eagle Comics in Reading, Pennsylvania, which was also the site for the Episode 200 recording later that year. When the number of listeners showing up for these recordings outgrew what Golden Eagle could accommodate comfortably, Episode 300 moved to an unoccupied storefront inside the Fairgrounds Square Mall. This was the final milestone episode event held by Comic Geek Speak before switching to a convention model for their listener gatherings.

In September 2008, Comic Geek Speak hosted the first Comic Geek Speak Super Show, a creator focused comic convention at the Greater Reading Expo Center in Reading, Pennsylvania. Notable guests included Mike Norton, Jamal Igle, David Petersen, Sal Abbinanti of Atomika, Buzz Aw, Morry Hollowell, Danielle Corsetto and many others.
