= The Ricky Gervais Show (TV series) =

Adult animated comedy television series

- The title card of the series, drawn in the show's classic Hanna-Barbera-like style, showing Ricky Gervais
- Genre: Adult animation Cartoon; Comedy; Podcast
- Created by: Ricky Gervais; Stephen Merchant; Karl Pilkington
- Directed by: Craig Kellman (season 1); Dan Fraga (seasons 2–3)
- Voices of: Ricky Gervais; Stephen Merchant; Karl Pilkington
- Composer: Glyn Hughes
- Countries of origin: United States; United Kingdom
- Original language: English
- No. of seasons: 3
- No. of episodes: 39 (list of episodes)

Production
- Executive producers: Ricky Gervais; Stephen Merchant; Karl Pilkington; Glyn Hughes; Bob Higgins; Lisa Ullmann; Steve Patrick (seasons 2–3)
- Producers: Michelle Papandrew (season 1); Michelle Wilson (season 2); Pamela Arseneau (season 3)
- Editors: Damon P. Yoches (season 1); Mattaniah Adams (seasons 2–3)
- Running time: 21–27 minutes
- Production companies: Wildbrain Entertainment; Media Rights Capital; HBO Entertainment

Original release
- Network: HBO (United States); Channel 4/E4 (United Kingdom)
- Release: 19 February 2010 – 13 July 2012

The Ricky Gervais Show is an adult animated comedy television series produced for and broadcast by HBO and Channel 4. The series is an animated version of the popular audio podcasts and audiobooks of the same name, which feature Ricky Gervais, Stephen Merchant (creators of The Office and Extras) along with colleague and friend Karl Pilkington, talking about various subjects behind the microphone. The TV series consists of past audio recordings of these unscripted "pointless conversations," with animation drawn in a style similar to classic era Hanna-Barbera cartoons, presenting jokes and situations in a literal context.

The animated Ricky Gervais Show aired 39 episodes across three series starting in 2010. There were some plans for a possible fourth series which would have used newly recorded audio, but this was shelved in June 2012. Series 3 of The Ricky Gervais Show premiered on 20 April 2012 on HBO, and on 8 May 2012 on E4.

== History ==
After the first series of The Office was broadcast in 2001, creators Ricky Gervais and Stephen Merchant returned to local radio station XFM London, where they used to host their own radio show. For this revival of The Ricky Gervais Show, Karl Pilkington worked as radio producer, and steadily became a more and more important part of the show. After years of the three doing the radio show, in 2005, they started doing a series of free podcasts, and later paid audiobooks, available to download on the Internet. The Show consistently ranked as the number one podcast in the world and previously held the Guinness World Record as the most downloaded podcast ever with over 300 million downloads as of March 2011.

Discussions about the animated series began in 2008; Gervais first mentioned the project on his blog in November 2008. Earlier collaborations with HBO include the co-production of the Gervais/Merchant series Extras together with the BBC, as well as Gervais's Out of England stand-up comedy special. The first preview clip of the series was shown on Late Show with David Letterman, in November 2009.

The episode "Knob at Night" was nominated for the Primetime Emmy Award for Outstanding Animated Program (for Programming Less Than One Hour) at the 62nd Primetime Emmy Awards.

== Broadcast and distribution ==
Series	Episodes	Originally released	
Series	Episodes	First released	Last released
1	13	19 February 2010	21 May 2010
2	13	14 January 2011	15 April 2011
3	13	20 April 2012	13 July 2012

Each season of The Ricky Gervais Show consists of 13 episodes. The series premiered in the United States on 19 February 2010 on HBO. The second season started on 14 January 2011. and the third on 20 April 2012. In the United Kingdom, the series premiered on 23 April 2010 on Channel 4. The first season was shown on Channel 4, with the following seasons airing on its counterpart, E4 first. Though a co-production, Channel 4 air HBO's edit rather than making their own with their own name in the credits.

The first season was released on region 2 DVD on 19 July 2010. The region 1 (North American) DVD was released on 4 January 2011. Extras on the region 1 release include a short piece of animation created for the Channel 4 Comedy Gala, and the storyboard version of episode 3, "Charity", showing what the animation looks in the middle of production. The region 2 DVD contains all these, along with a number of videos where the three friends chat, as well as original HBO commercials and trailers for the show.

The Series 2 DVD had initially been made available only through Warner Archive as a "made-to-order" DVD (meaning the disc is only produced once it is ordered). The three-disc set includes as extras storyboard versions of Episodes 8 ("Future") and 13 ("Munchies"), two of the HBO promotional interviews with Ricky Gervais, and a two-question interview of all three stars. The second series was eventually given a wide release on 25 June 2012 in the UK.

The Series 3 DVD was released in April 2013.

All three seasons can be purchased through Amazon Prime in HD.

In June 2012, Ricky Gervais stated on his blog that he was not sure whether there would be a fourth season, because he felt that he had used up all the good material. However, the series had not been ended for certain.

"I think the show has steadily grown in both quality and popularity and I'd love to go out on a high so to speak. My worry is that as we've used up all the best material we'd have to record hours and hours of new stuff and it might ruin the naivety of the whole thing. Never say never though, like The Office. But certainly for now."

– Ricky Gervais.

In July 2012, Ricky Gervais stated on Twitter that the third season of The Ricky Gervais Show would be the last:

"Bad news: Last Ricky Gervais Show tonight on E4."

== See also ==
- The Ricky Gervais Show – the podcast and audio book series that the TV show is based on
- List of The Ricky Gervais Show (TV series) episodes – the episodes of the cartoon series
- An Idiot Abroad – a travel documentary series in which Ricky Gervais and Stephen Merchant send Karl Pilkington to various places around the world
