= Tarot: Witch of the Black Rose =

American comic book

- Cover to issue #1 of Tarot: Witch of the Black Rose (March 2000). Art by Jim Balent and colors by Holly Golightly.

Publication information
- Publisher: BroadSword Comics
- Schedule: Bi-monthly
- Format: Ongoing
- Publication date: 2000–present
- No. of issues: 145 (as of May 2025)
- Main character: Tarot

Creative team
- Created by: Jim Balent
- Written by: Jim Balent
- Artist: Jim Balent
- Colorist: Holly Golightly

Tarot: Witch of the Black Rose is an American comic book, written and drawn by Jim Balent with coloring and lettering by Holly Golightly and published by BroadSword Comics since 2000.

It is the story of Tarot, a warrior witch, and her family, friends and lovers. The comic generally features fantasy, horror, action, and adventure interspersed with frequent scenes of nudity. As well as the comic narrative, each issue is backed up with interviews with actual witches and Wiccan practitioners, and guides for casting fan-submitted spells.

== Tarot Universe ==
=== Witchcraft ===
Witchcraft, Wicca, or simply Craft is the way by which witches manipulate mystical forces. The Craft is Wicca-based, with the Threefold Law an important lesson shown in the series. Witches use diverse ways to attain supernatural powers, being Tarot reading, scrying, ceremonial magic, or potion making.

=== The deities ===
Because most of the main characters are Wiccans, the Wiccan gods are important to the story. They seem antagonistic to religious intolerance, and appear only infrequently and always in surreal and mystical forms. The Wiccan God and Goddess are embodiments of the dualism of the universe, two opposing and balanced forces.

=== Magick ===
In Tarot's universe, magick is a real and very powerful force. According to the Goddess, magick emanates from the union of all things, because all things are interconnected. Nothing, no matter how small, can be separated from the whole, similar to the Gaia hypothesis.

=== Mythological beings ===
Beings from mythology such as dragons, fairies, elves, and gorgons are very real but exist only in a magical dimension apart from the real world. This dimension, referred to as "the Realm Beyond the Mist", is a place of enchantment. Some magical beings, such as dragons, see their imposed exile as humiliating, and believe that magical creatures should band together to destroy humanity.

== Characters ==
=== Main characters ===
==== Tarot ====
Originally called Rowan, she protects her family and her craft as the Swordmaiden of the Black Rose coven. By her own admission she is not a master witch, yet still quite knowledgeable and capable with both a spell and a sword. Tarot lives with her mother, and sister Raven Hex. She takes her job very seriously, even previously refusing to marry because of the dangers her position poses to those closest to her.

Tarot's magical name stems from her psychic connection to tarot cards, which allow her brief glimpses of important events, warnings, and connections to her loved ones despite distance. She was granted the title and responsibility of Swordmaiden to the Goddess after passing a series of trials (of both physical and magical combat). As part of her position, she wears enchanted armor, including a horned mask.

Tarot has a winged cat familiar named Pooka, and two lovers, Jon Webb and Boo Cat. Tarot is charged by the gods to protect mankind from threats, such as the Dragon Witch, sorcerers, terrorists, and even her own sister. Her constant role is to battle forces that upset or endanger the balance of mankind and the realms of magick, and to gently encourage mankind to accept magick instead of lashing out against it.

==== Raven Hex ====
Tarot's older and darker sister. She longs to create a world in which witches may live free of persecution, and has gone so far as to raise up an island from the sea where only witches may set foot. Despite her aggressive and often violent tendencies, she loves her sister and mother very much and has every intention of allowing them to live in her witches' paradise.

Her skin is permanently moonlight blue-white, due to her allegiance with dark magic, and she has a snakelike skeletal tattoo covering her body. For a short time, she had an apprentice named Willowry, who stole a necromancy scroll; she was punished by the Goddess, who turned her into a willow tree for leaving the Goddess out of her spell and trying to separate her from the magic while trying to restore Crypt Chick's physical body (Issue #8). She is easily annoyed by fairies, and distrusts humans, giving them little leeway. It has been hinted that if she were to actually declare war on the mortal world, she could easily raise an army from amongst the supernatural beings, though after the debacle with the Dragon Witch, this assurance remains to be seen. She has had one known lover in the course of the series, Azure, who betrayed her in pursuit of power.

Her general distrust and dislike of non-magical humans stems from the bullying she suffered as a child, and her close ties with her father (who used dark magic to defend his family and was killed by its backlash). She does mellow somewhat over time, mainly towards Jon as they get into several embarrassing situations.

==== Jon Webb ====
Tarot's lover and ally, as well as a groundskeeper for an abandoned cemetery. After a near-fatal car crash, in which his lover died, Jon retained the ability to see, summon, and make corporeal the dead.

He prefers isolation, and protects his cemetery from looters and vandals by wearing a skeletal costume and frightening away, or outright attacking, trespassers. He goes by aliases such as the Skeleton Man, Graveyard Guardian, and Fright Knight. He is quite capable in a fight, even being able to outrun a group of angry dragons, although he is still only human, without any over-all magical talents whatsoever. As a sort of running gag, he is frequently rendered incapacitated, drunk, drugged, bewitched, or unconscious, and then taken advantage of by any number of women in his vicinity. He is quick with witty quips and puns in nearly every issue. It has been implied that he will have a child with Tarot in the future. He proposed to Tarot after taking her and her family to Hawaii, but she turned him down due to the danger her position created for him. He is deeply arachnophobic, and has a loyal ghost-dog named Wraith.

He recently reclaimed his cemetery from a powerful wraith-like spirit, following a brutal beating by a group of demonic thralls dressed like nuns. After a brief convalescence with the Fluffy Witch Coven, Jon returned and defeated the usurper and his thralls, rescuing Crypt Chick from Hell itself.

Jon is aware that Tarot has another love in addition to himself, though he is not dating anyone else. Although he has previously not raised concern with this, foreshadowing in recent issues indicates his growing unrest with the situation. However, Tarot has since accepted his second proposal for marriage. As of issue #100 in 2017, Tarot and Jon are a married couple.

=== Supporting characters ===
==== Crypt Chick ====
Crypt Chick, aka Brandi, is Jon's ex-girlfriend, a former singer who was killed in the crash that gave Jon his clairvoyance. She deeply resents her death and refuses to move on, going so far as to convince Raven's apprentice Willowry to steal a necromancy scroll to give her back her flesh. The attempt failed when Willowry arrogantly left the Wiccan Goddess' name out of the incantation, and was turned into a tree as punishment. Brandi, who adamantly insists on being called Crypt Chick, once even allied herself with Raven while the latter was still very much anti-mortal, but the alliance fell short when Raven refused to live up to her part of the agreement and restore Brandi to life. She has since mellowed somewhat, in large part due to Jon's having formed a band of ghosts for her to sing with. Despite showing no romantic inclinations toward Jon, Crypt Chick remains in the graveyard that he guards, and occasionally appears to assist him.

==== Boo Cat ====
A female werecat who is one of Tarot's current sexual partners. She is a saleswoman in a lingerie store, which is where she first saw Tarot. Boo Cat often deals with the isolationist mindsets of less-informed lycanthropes, giving the impression that she is a rare creature. She is quite the exhibitionist, and exuberant about anything that seems fun. She is also fiercely loyal in protecting and nurturing Tarot and her other lover, Licorice Dust. Despite this, Boo Cat's actions are often spontaneous and self-centered.

==== Licorice Dust ====
Boo Cat's lover, a vampire who dresses as a goth cheerleader. Her real name is never mentioned, but she takes the name Licorice because she is "sweet, and very bad for you". Licorice is quite committed to Boo, and has no other known lovers.

Licorice started the series as a somewhat shallow character, resenting humans for their fear toward her. She has quite a bit of rage, which she has channeled into being vigilant against those who hurt women and children. Due to her vampire nature, Licorice is supernaturally strong and agile, making her a blunt instrument when enraged.

Recently, her rage has spilled over into jealousy and resentment toward Tarot, as Boo's other lover. Licorice's actions have caused a very serious schism between herself and Tarot.

Part of her past was revealed. She and her friends were goths that willingly became vampires by a male vampire and killed him by wooden stake rather than be his sex slaves. She sometimes has reunions with her Goth-cheerleader vampire friends.

==== Mother ====
Tarot and Raven's Mother, a very voluptuous woman, who despite being a major character in several stories, has consistently remained unnamed. She cares for her daughters deeply and has joined them in several battles, most notably in the fight against Azure. She was stripped along with her daughters (as Boudica was with her daughters), but once freed she took charge of the battle.(she is based on Laurie Cabot, a Salem Ma Wiccan)

She has a close connection with the faerie realm, and is often seen with several fae cavorting around her. She appears generally calm, congenial, and wise though has occasional moments of sexual banter with her daughters and Jon. She does not appear to have taken any lovers since the death of Tarot and Raven's father, nor is she often seen outside of the manor.

=== Adversaries ===
==== Azure ====
Azure is a dark elf whose attempts at uncovering immortality turned him into a maddened vampire-elf. He was chained for a thousand years to keep him from destroying the human world, but he escaped by ensorcelling his elven female guards and turning them into vampires. He tried to raise an army to lead against mankind with Raven Hex as the leader, but she refused him, forcing him to use one of his vampire slaves instead.

Shortly afterwards, Azure enacted his revenge against the witches, seriously wounding Tarot's mother, and stabbing Tarot through the abdomen. Although both women survived, Tarot has apparently lost the ability to have children as a result of Azure's curse. Once she has recovered, Tarot sneaks into Azure's prison and confronts him, learning that it was he who told the Dragon Witches about Raven's gathering, and he who sent the lich that beat Jon nearly to death. He also revealed that he did not escape his cell—something had bored its way in, allowing him to cause chaos while still in chains. While Azure is still gloating, Tarot decapitates him and puts his head in a jar of salt, effectively rendering the insane immortal brain dead.

==== Mor-Meb-Dred, the Dragon Witch ====
A female dragon, who is able to assume the form of a humanoid female. Like most of her kind, she hates humans because they hunted dragons in the past, calling these dragonslayers "heroes" when more often than not they were merely murderers. These dragons completely embrace Raven's more militant views, and even join Azure when they believe Raven is leading his army. But when the truth is revealed, the dragons strike at Azure; although they still believe that humans should be wiped out. It is ironic that the main dragon witch featured comes to Raven's aid, when she later attacks and seemingly kills Raven for being slighted at a meeting of the covens. However, Raven is revealed alive, albeit gravely wounded, and even the Dragon-Witch is revealed to have survived, only dying momentarily before being revived in a dragon ceremony akin to a Viking funeral.

Currently, there is an uneasy truce between the Dragon Witches and the Black Rose coven.

==== The Bleeding Man ====
A grotesque figure, his eyes seem to constantly seep blood, and he covers the upper half of his face with a burial shroud. He lives in an elegant but ruined temple upon the summit of a snowcapped mountain in the fairy realm. It is implied that this ancient temple headquarters was built by a defunct and long-forgotten religion and that the Bleeding Man himself may be a follower or priest of some corrupted or misinterpreted version of that same religion.

The Bleeding Man is obsessed with locating an Object of Power called the Witch Key (later revealed to simply be the concept of freedom, a concept the Bleeding Man is unable to comprehend), and takes to abducting witches from all realms to find it. He sends out a volcanic rock henchman who finds Tarot and kidnaps her. His servants brutally and continuously torture and rape her for ten days. The Bleeding Man harvests and consumes Tarot's breast milk and vaginal fluid, thinking her power may lie in them. When he does not find the "Witch Key", he inters Tarot in a special iron maiden as a form of psychological torture. The spikes of the maiden don't penetrate her, but force her to stand perfectly still for 3 days straight at the risk of otherwise being impaled. As soon as she is released from the maiden, Tarot engineers her escape. After a brief recuperation, she returns to the Bleeding Man's temple and frees her dis-empowered sister witches from captivity. Tarot leads a successful but pyrrhic assault against the Bleeding Man, and manages to dismember him by cutting off his hands during a sword duel. He is trapped within the same iron maiden Tarot had been kept in earlier. As a final revenge, Tarot then casts the Iron Maiden into a lake, where presumably the Bleeding Man will be trapped and concealed indefinitely.

==== Latex Red ====
Referring to herself as "the Fabulous" Latex Red, she is typically an adversary of another Jim Balent property, the super heroine team "Three Little Kitties", but has crossed paths with Tarot as well. In short, Latex Red is a narcissistic and incredibly psychotic lesbian who acts as a mercenary and bounty hunter—she's not, ostensibly, evil but her methods take no account for casualties or collateral damage and she does whatever she has to capture or kill her targets. Even if it means killing others. Uniquely, while all of Jim Balent's characters present extremely curvaceous physiques, Latex Red is far more so than the rest as a result of cosmetic surgery...and, more so, besides simply having her breasts increased to preposterous sizes, she has had them implanted with powerful explosives to kill anyone who manages to kill her. Unfortunately Latex Red is extremely top heavy and can fall over under her own weight. She's also farcically vain and has a tendency to boast and brag of victory before attaining it, which is how Tarot easily defeated the self-centered mercenary. She used to be one of the Three Little Kitties, until her proclivity for violence (and obsession with plastic surgery) made her a liability and she was cast out of the group. Now she operates her own mercenary group made up of Asian assassins dressed as stereotypical anime schoolgirls.

=== Guest stars ===
Occasionally, background characters that are modeled after real-life Tarot fans and friends will show up in an issue (most notably the "Witch Key" story arc). These have included noted pagan celebrities as well.

==== Raven and Stephanie Grimassi ====
Noted pagan author and scholar Raven Grimassi has appeared as a powerful recurring character, as has his wife Stephanie. Most recently, it was revealed that the two of them were guardians of the library of magick-keepers of the knowledge of all spells ever created.

==== Fiona Horne ====
Wiccan priestess, model, actress, author, singer, and TV personality Fiona Horne has appeared in the series as the gracious Queen of Witches.

==== Tonya Kay ====
Actress, author, performance artist, and contestant on Who Wants to Be a Superhero?, Tonya Kay has appeared as herself in the storyline recently (with her stuffed animal familiar, Teddi). As a "Kayotic" witch, she aids Tarot in defending against the Medusa, who seeks to wipe them both from existence in order to dis-empower Tarot, Tonya, and all those who are inspired by them.

==== Holly Golightly ====
As well as being the visual inspiration for Tarot, artist/colorist Holly Golightly has appeared as the "Holly Witch", complete with chipmunk familiar Captain Paddywhack.

== Awards ==
Sunday, March 1, 2009 at the MegaCon convention Tarot: Witch of the Black Rose and character Raven Hex won three of the twenty-five categories in the first inaugural Project Fanboy Awards. The title Tarot: Witch of the Black Rose won the category Best Title and Best Indy Title and the character Raven Hex won the category Best Indy Villain.
