= Jim Balent =

American comic book artist

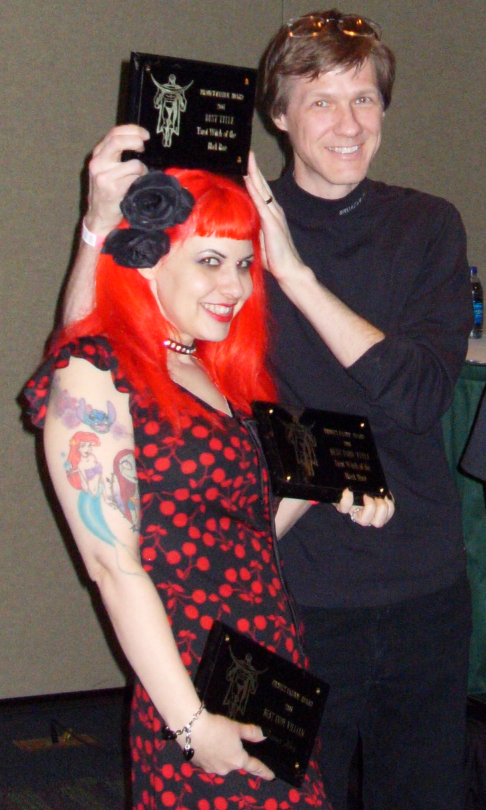
- Balent photographed with his wife, Holly Golightly, at the MegaCon comic book convention
- Born: August 15, 1963 (age 63)
- Areas: Writer, Penciller, Inker, Editor, Publisher
- Notable works: Catwoman; Tarot: Witch of the Black Rose
- Spouse: Holly Golightly

Jim Balent (/ˈbælənt/) is an American comics artist, writer, and publisher from Pennsylvania. He is best known for his long run on Catwoman between 1993 and 1999. Balent has also drawn Batman and Lobo for DC Comics, as well as some of the issues of Purgatori for the independent comic book publisher Chaos! Comics.

== Career ==
Balent's early work for DC Comics includes backup stories in Sgt. Rock such as "The Deadliest Casualty" in issue #393 (October 1984) and "The Ninja" in #397 (February 1985). An Atom story drawn by Balent was published as a Bonus Book in Power of the Atom #4 (November 1988). Balent and writer Jo Duffy launched an ongoing Catwoman series in August 1993. Balent drew Catwoman through issue #77 (February 2000). He and writer Chuck Dixon created Geist in Detective Comics Annual #6 (1993). As the artist of Catwoman, Balent worked on several Batman crossover stories including "Contagion", "Cataclysm", and "No Man's Land". In 1999, Balent left mainstream comics to form his own company, BroadSword Comics, which publishes Tarot: Witch of the Black Rose, written and drawn by Balent himself. In an interview with Project Fanboy, a comic book website, Balent spoke of his interest in both entertaining as well as educating his readers about the folklore and actual theology of Wicca and witchcraft with interviews with leading witch authors and spells from witches around the world. Balent drew a retailer exclusive variant cover for Batman vol. 3 #50 (September 2018) for Jetpack Comics / Forbidden Planet.

== Awards ==
On March 1, 2009, Balent's company, BroadSword Comics, won three of the 25 categories in the inaugural Project Fanboy Awards and was nominated for ten other categories at the MegaCon convention. His title Tarot: Witch of the Black Rose won in the categories of "Best Title" and "Best Indy Title", and the character Raven Hex from the aforementioned title won in the category of "Best Indy Villain".

== Bibliography ==
=== BroadSword Comics ===
- 3 Little Kittens: Purrr-fect Weapons #1–3 (2002)
- Tarot: Witch of the Black Rose #1–145 (2000–As of May 2025)

=== Chaos Comics ===
- Purgatori: Prelude #1 (1996)
- Purgatori: The Vampires Myth #1–3 (1996)

=== Dark Horse Comics ===
- Dark Horse Presents #71–73 (1993)

=== DC Comics ===
- Batman #507 (1994)
- Batman 80-Page Giant #2 (1999)
- Batman: Batgirl #1 (1998)
- Batman: Brotherhood of the Bat #1 (1995)
- Catwoman vol. 2 #1–30, 33–77, #0, #1000000, Annual #2; #31–32 (layouts) (1993–2000)
- Catwoman/Vampirella: The Furies #1 (1997)
- Catwoman: Guardian of Gotham #1–2 (1999)
- Darkstars #7 (1993)
- Detective Comics #660, Annual #6 (1993)
- Green Lantern Corps Quarterly #4–6 (1993)
- Green Lantern: Mosaic #9 (1993)
- Legends of the Dark Claw #1 (1996)
- Lobo's Big Babe Spring Break Special #1 (1995)
- Power of the Atom #4 (Bonus Book) (1988)
- Sgt. Rock #393, 397 (backup stories) (1984–1985)
- Showcase '95 #4 (Catwoman) (1995)

=== First Comics ===
- Evangeline #11–12 (1989)
- Nexus #42 (1988)

=== Harris Comics ===
- Vampirella #1–3 (1992–1993)

Preceded by n/a	Catwoman penciller 1993–2000	Succeeded by Staz Johnson
