= Dan Fraga =

- Born: June 19, 1973 (age 53) Walnut Creek, California, U.S.
- Areas: Writer, Penciller

Dan Fraga (/ˈfreɪɡə/; born June 19, 1973) is an American comic book artist, storyboard artist, concept artist, and animation and film director. He also hosts a Youtube show called, "Couchdoodles Show". Immediately after high school, he was hired to work as an illustrator for Rob Liefeld's Extreme Studios, one of the founding partner studios that made up Image Comics.

== Career ==
Dan Fraga began his career in the entertainment field as a comic book artist. He has worked on many comics like Spider-Man, Wolverine and Bloodstrike. He has also worked as a storyboard artist. Some of his career highlights include working on storyboards for Hershey's, Victoria's Secret, and music videos for top artist Justin Timberlake and also Beyoncé. During his time as a storyboard artist, Dan took on several other responsibilities including set design, visual effects supervision, and 2nd unit directing.

=== Comic books ===
Black Flag is a superhero team and comic book series originally written and illustrated by Dan Fraga. It was published by Maximum Press and one preview edition by Image Comics in 1995. The comic features an organized para-military-styled team of characters composed of a former military Landstorm pilot, a master of mysticism, a billionaire heiress, an eight-foot-talking purple gorilla, a dimension-hopping shapeshifting alien revolutionary, and a boy who can make fantasy a reality with the snap of his fingers.

In April 2020, Fraga brought back the Black Flag IP with the graphic novel Black Flag: Pineapple Perception. The art and style are reminiscent of the original comic, but with modern updates. It is intended to be the first in a four-part series. The creative team includes Fraga, Will Perdomo (story), Shelby Robertson (inks), and Matt Yackey (colors). The first novel was crowdfunded on Indiegogo, and has raised over $200,000 by February 2021. There have been no updates on the project since July of 2025, and as of August of 2026 the book has not yet been completed.

==== Web comics ====
In January 2013, Fraga launched a webcomic called The Grave, publishing a panel every day for a year. The Grave follows a group of children on a camping trip, who find a mysterious grave with a fully clothed skeleton inside. The children deduce facts about the buried man using clues from the grave.

==== Television ====
Fraga made his directing debut in 2009 on the MTV show The Hard Times of RJ Berger handling the animation duties for the show. There were two seasons about a 15-year-old unpopular RJ Berger who becomes infamous after an embarrassing incident. Each episode featured live-action intermixed with different styles of animation.

He directed the second and third seasons of the HBO series The Ricky Gervais Show which were voiced by Ricky Gervais, Stephen Merchant and Karl Pilkington. The series was an animated version of The Ricky Gervais Show using audio from previously recorded live radio shows, podcasts, and audiobooks.

In 2018, Dan moved to Atlanta to work as the storyboard artist on the CW's Legacies and DC's Doom Patrol.

== Sources ==
- Dan Fraga at the Grand Comics Database
- Dan Fraga at the Comic Book DB (archived from the original)
