= Holly Golightly (illustrator) =

American cartoonist

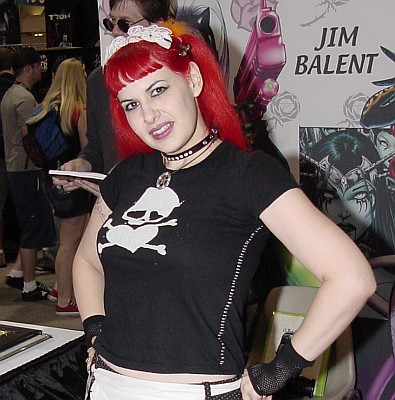
- Golightly at San Diego Comic-Con in 2006
- Born: September 1, 1964 (age 62)
- Areas: Writer, Penciller, Inker, Letterer, Colourist
- Pseudonyms: Fauve; Holly G!
- Notable works: Tarot: Witch of the Black Rose "School Bites"
- Spouse: Jim Balent

Holly Golightly (born September 1, 1964) is an American comics artist and writer. She was formerly known as Fauve and has also worked under the name Holly G!

== Biography ==
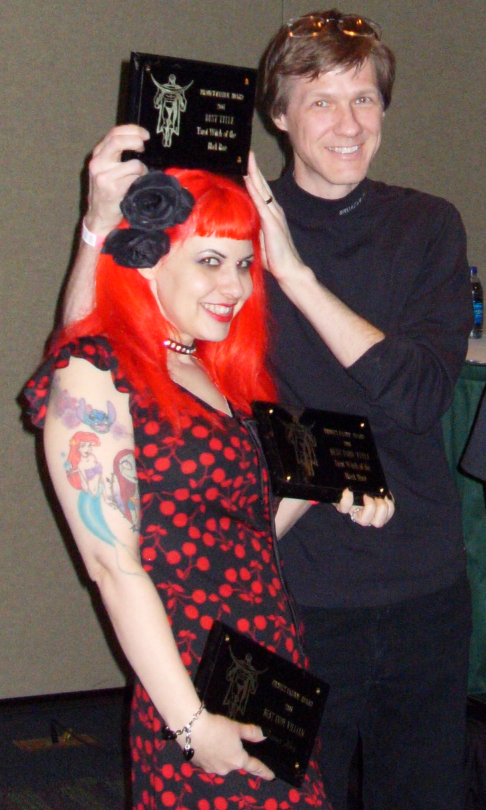
Holly Golightly and husband Jim Balent.

Holly Golightly entered the comics industry in the 1990s under the pen name Fauve, doing work for the Carnal Comics title True Stories of Adult Film Stars, including three issues on Sarah-Jane Hamilton (one of which sported her first published cover illustration) and stories featuring Julia Ann, Janine Lindemulder, and Lilli Xene. Golightly names artist Frank Thorne as her "hero" for his work on Red Sonja. Golightly's list of work ranges from Nightmare Theatre for Chaos! Comics to Sabrina for Archie Comics to her creator-owned work such as Vampfire and School Bites.

She is the colorist for husband Jim Balent's Tarot: Witch of the Black Rose as well as the model for Tarot herself. She has frequently been shown on the photo covers dressed as Tarot and as Catress from the 3 Little Kittens comics and is the model for the official Tarot photo calendar.

She has expanded into pin-ups/modeling with Balent doing the photography and has her own pin-up calendar. She designed and maintains both of their official websites, and designs many of the T-shirts and apparel that the site offers.

Golightly also contributes art for various businesses and people including NewWitch magazine and Thomas Dolby.

Golightly and Balent operate the BroadSword Comics comics publishing company, known for its Tarot: Witch of the Black Rose comic book. Under this company, Golightly has published Fears and Ears: A Travel Guide to Orlando as well as numerous art books of her own work. Golightly frequently draws one-page stories featuring her cat, Pangur Ban. A collection of these stories was published through Kickstarter in 2015.

== Bibliography ==
=== Archie Comics ===
- Archie & Friends #52–56, 58, 60, 62–63 (2001–2002)
- Archie's Holiday Fun Digest #3 (1999)
- Archie's Pal Jughead Comics #139 (2001)
- Betty #99 (one page) (2001)
- Betty and Veronica #130, 134, 159 (1998–2001)
- Cheryl Blossom #21, 30, 33, 37 (1999–2001)
- Jughead's Double Digest #57 (1999)
- Sabrina #32–33, 35–37 (2002)
- Sabrina the Teenage Witch #38–58 (2003–2004)

=== Blackout Comics ===
- Bad Girls of Blackout Annual #1 (1995)

=== Brainstorm Comics ===
- Bethany the Vampfire #0 (1997)
- Vamperotica #8, Annual #1 (1995)
- Vampfire #1 (1996)
- Vampfire Tour Book #1 (1997)

=== BroadSword Comics ===
- 3 Little Kittens: Purrr-fect Weapons #1–3 (2002)
- School Bites (2004)
- Prince Pangur Ban the Fluffy: Mother of Fluffins the Collected Series (2015)
- Tarot: Witch of the Black Rose #1–144 (colorist and letterer) (2000–present)
- VampFire #3 (2001)

=== Chaos! Comics ===
- Nightmare Theater #1–4 (1997)

=== London Night Studios ===
- Razor: Swimsuit Special #1 (1995)

=== Sirius Entertainment ===
- Poison Elves #2 (1996)

Preceded by Dave Manak	Sabrina / Sabrina the Teenage Witch artist 2002–2004	Succeeded by Tania del Rio
