= List of The Ricky Gervais Show episodes =

The following is an episode list for The Ricky Gervais Show, which was at one time credited as the most-downloaded podcast ever, with "nearly 8 million" downloads, according to the BBC. This record was set several years before podcasting had become a mainstream medium, and thus Gervais and his team are often considered trailblazers for the medium. The series stars Ricky Gervais and Stephen Merchant of The Office and Extras fame, as well as Karl Pilkington. The series began as a free feature on the website of The Guardian, but a cost was added when the series was marketed by Audible for the second and third series.

== Podcasts / Audiobooks ==
=== Series 1 ===
#	Date	Overview
101	5 December 2005	Bodcasts, iPods, Derek Acorah, dilapidated mansion. Monkey News: Monkey astronaut.
102	12 December 2005	Cambodian Midget Fighting League, Paul 'The Party Animal' Parker. Monkey News: The value of money.
103	19 December 2005	Chimp mauling, 'Knob at night'. Monkey News: Monkey sanctuary.
104	26 December 2005	Christmas good will gift, superpowers, origins of the kiss at a wedding. Monkey News: Chimp interviews Cher.
105	2 January 2006	Colonic irrigation, TV show Tribes, armed dolphins, dance remix of 'Knob at Night'. Monkey News: Ollie the chimp.
106	9 January 2006	The Chinese homeless (and lack thereof), the Pillow Man, 'a stitch in time saves nine'. Monkey News: Chimp firemen.
107	16 January 2006	Washing up without using thumbs, Karl looks out of his apartment window and sees a naked woman, Bruce Willis, the cobbler, paper round dream job, Plato, testicular cancer. Monkey News: Monkey workman.
108	23 January 2006	The Diary of Karl Pilkington, the watch that can predict your own death, 'Jimmy the Hat'. Monkey News: Chimp bobsledding.
109	30 January 2006	Saving Ricky or Steve, Question for Karl, Steve's octopus dish. Monkey News: Chimp pilots.
110	6 February 2006	The Karl Pilkington show, talking to animals, ice pop of death, adult nappies, Karl's litter tray, wrestling Karl, Karl Dilkington, a "wewe" (an ugly female ghost with drooping breasts). Monkey News: Jockey chimp.
111	13 February 2006	Global village idiot, dishwasher on mars, re-introducing dinosaurs, fight over a girl, invention of the plane, sloths. Monkey News: Chimp (cheap) doctors.
112	20 February 2006	Guinness World Records, meeting Suzanne, being trapped inside animals. Monkey News: Enos the chimponaut (possible source: http://www.savethechimps.org/about.asp).

=== Radio 2 Holiday Shows ===
Gervais, Merchant and Pilkington broadcast two hour-long holiday specials on Radio 2 during the 2005 holiday season, the first airing on Christmas Eve and the second on New Year's Eve.

=== Series 2 ===
#	Date	Overview
201	27 February 2006	Karl worries about the stationery implications of relocating to another planet; Relativity and re-runs of the 1980 World Cup Final; Doppelganger – The Karl Who Haunted Himself; A brainteaser for a man with no brain; Extracts from Karl's diary; Plus, for the cognoscenti, the timely return of 'Rockbusters'. Karl's diary:
202	7 March 2006	Karl Pilkington – the talk of tinsel-town; There's no news like no news; Karl's illustrated book of ages; Tall and pale and naked and waving; Karl's diary – Auntie Nora, cat criticism, unappealing ultrasound scans, the passing fad that is hoummous, mind/brain confusion and the elderly lady with the bent neck; and... Rockbusters. Karl's diary: Auntie Nora, cats.
203	14 March 2006	Complaints relating to the perception of an inadequate frequency of expletives are addressed; Look who's listening; Social engineering at the North Pole; Questioning the credentials of TV pathologists; Karl's top twin tips; Plastic surgery at the deli counter; Risky dining and cancerous carnivore; Rockbusters. Karl's diary: Congo confusion, vegetable timepieces, subterranean schoolfriends, porcine-pated ladies, beehive boozers.
204	21 March 2006	Genocidal anura; Anthropomorphism and Fluffy the poodle; Reflections on the inducement of camouflage-feedback in visually impaired chameleons; Karl gets his head around the concept of a multiverse; Steve the party animal; Rockbusters. Karl's diary: The worrying mortality rate of Karl's pets; blind dates, lunar lunacy, quadrupedal enclaves, common or garden aliens.
205	28 March 2006	Karl's Freudian slip-up, Surgical quotas, Biblical logistics, designer loo-roll, bed & boredom, prandial sorbets for pretentious brats, inappropriate choices for vehicular nomenclature, cemetery sightseeing, Karl's secrets to a successful relationship, Steve's unsound method of obtaining sound advice, Rockbusters. Karl's diary: Suzanne's Birthday Treat
206	4 April 2006	Some sad news about an elderly tortoise proves a versatile opener for conversation – sparking a discussion on suppressed memories, longevity and who if anyone is in charge of Karl's brain. Karl ponders his most favourite and least favourite words and proposes a lexicographical cull. Believing that octopuses aren't the friendly little creatures they're portrayed as in films, Karl considers some suitable terms of abuse, Rockbusters. Karl's diary: Philosophers and their names; Lao Tse's advice for spectators.

=== Series 3 ===
#	Date	Overview
301	22 August 2006	Insects, insects and more insects. Karl's diary: Karl writes a poem to sum up his day.
302	29 August 2006	Kidney Stones and Stick Insects. While Karl is in hospital for treatment of Kidney Stones, he is given time to think. He asks Ricky and Steve if leaf insects were insects that had just been "havin' it off" with a leaf. Steve tries to yet again persuade Karl that insects do not have consciousness and fails.
303	5 September 2006	Karl's kidney-induced epiphany; Karl uses his spare time to brush up on his ant facts; Survival tactics; Super-evolving jellyfish inspire some bardic utterances; Fact or fiction? Karl ponders storytelling. Karl's Diary: Displaced llamas and fussy eaters.
304	12 September 2006	Karl is accused of not pulling his weight by Ricky and Steve and his TV programmes are criticised in the press. Steve's dancing skills are the subject of some tabloid mockery and Ricky doubts the merit of Karl's clip-on mug mat. Karl's diary: The doctor who doesn't open his eyes much
305	19 September 2006	Karl's contribution to the British Library; A man whose skull "fell out"; Karl pimps his forehead; Steve's big night out. Karl's diary: Monkey toll-booth, a slug's life, and how to get attention in a corner shop.
306	26 September 2006	Karl wonders how he'd react to meeting one of his many celebrity fans; Karl explores the concept of equal opportunities; From determinism to morning goods in one fell swoop. Karl's diary: In-depth coverage of Karl's recent relapse.

=== The Podfather (Series 4) ===
#	Date	Overview
401 (Halloween)	31 October 2006	Ghostly drivel abounds as Steve consults a text-based oracle, Karl experiences a kidney probing, Steve visits Bristol, Karl becomes a Godfather and Ricky tells of some lighter moments at the morgue.
402 (Thanksgiving)	23 November 2006	Karl launches a campaign for a calendar-free society, Ricky explains the origins of Thanksgiving, prompting a question as to which 5 current well known people Karl would choose to start a new society. Steve brings up the sterling work mice are carrying out in the name of medicine.
403 (Christmas)	24 December 2006	Karl reflects on the past year and singles out an unlikely highlight; Steve stocks up on yuletide essentials; Karl advocates an anarchic Christmas; Karl's diary draws to a close with revelations of bothersome footwear and worry-holes ... and Ricky provides an emotional exit en route to the orphanage.

=== Fame special ===
A special podcast was made available as a giveaway to people that went to see Gervais' standup tour Fame. On 12 October 2007 this was made available as a free download to the general public, via the same subscription as the video podcasts.

#	Date	Overview
Special	12 October 2007	Karl discusses his boiler and his film pitch, Steve reads extracts from Karl's book 'Happyslapped by a Jellyfish and Other True Stories'. The three also discuss the possibility of bringing the show back for a fourth series in 2008.

=== Hour Long Bonus Podcast ===
Originally released as an extra on the audio CD release of series one, it was later made available free through iTunes.

#	Date	Overview
Special	25 November 2007	A special free one-hour-long podcast originally available only on audio CD. Ricky and Steve continue to probe Karl with questions from Inside the Actors Studio.

=== NME Radio Show ===
Ricky, Steve and Karl recorded a two-hour radio show as part of the test transmissions for the new radio station NME Radio. This was recorded on Thursday 5 June in London and premiered on Monday 9 June 2008, 12 pm (BST).

=== Series 5 ===
Four episodes of season five were released on 15 September 2008 through the iTunes Store.

#	Date	Overview
501	15 September 2008	Karl philosophizes about minimalism and relates picking out songs for his iPod to Ricky’s usage of 'dead owls' to fill empty living space. The trio revisits a previously discussed topic of useless inventions. Finally they discuss gay marriage; Karl is asked to make a difficult choice about marrying a gay man.
502	15 September 2008	Ricky revisits Karl’s slighted and heartbroken hypothetical gay husband. Ricky, Steve, and Karl play Room 102; slugs and breast milk pushers are banished, Karl also bemoans the lost potential of peoples' brains and his restless leg syndrome. Finally Karl is given the opportunity to pick which scientific research is allowed to continue.
503	15 September 2008	The trio discusses the obesity epidemic and possible remedies. Ricky reminisces about his earlier days as a fit, energetic youth, and his fashion escapades with home-made clothing. Karl discusses exotic fruit consumption by children and the general availability of food.
504	15 September 2008	Ricky talks about a spider-infested village in Indonesia; Karl discusses his mother’s pet spider with "Tipp-Ex on its back". Steve discusses living under the Nazi regime. Karl is asked to consider whether he would harbour Anne Frank. Finally, Karl muses on learning new vocabulary on a desert island.

=== The Ricky Gervais Guide to... ===
The latest series starring Gervais, Merchant and Pilkington is called The Ricky Gervais Guide to...

==== Series 1 ====
#	Date	Overview
601	31 December 2008	The Ricky Gervais guide to... Medicine
602	21 January 2009	The Ricky Gervais guide to... Natural History
603	24 February 2009	The Ricky Gervais guide to... The Arts
604	17 March 2009	The Ricky Gervais guide to... Philosophy
605	23 April 2009	The Ricky Gervais guide to... The English

==== Series 2 ====
#	Date	Overview
701	3 November 2009	The Ricky Gervais guide to... Society
702	1 December 2009	The Ricky Gervais guide to... Law and Order
703	29 December 2009	The Ricky Gervais guide to... The Future
704	26 January 2010	The Ricky Gervais guide to... The Human Body
705	23 February 2010	The Ricky Gervais guide to... The Earth
706	12 June 2010	The Ricky Gervais guide to... The World Cup (free download)
707	6 March 2011	The Ricky Gervais guide to... Comic Relief (free download)

=== A Day in the Life of Karl ===
A special one-off podcast where Ricky, Steve and Karl discuss a day in the life of Karl.

#	Date	Overview
Special	28 October 2010	A special one-off podcast. Karl describes a day in his life.

== Video podcasts ==
#	Date	Overview
1	24 March 2006	Ricky asks Karl to choose between letting Ricky tie his head to his knees and be locked in a cage until he was permanently deformed into that shape, or, to allow Ricky to perform facial surgery to sew up his mouth, nose and eyes and remove his ears.
2	2 April 2006	Ricky Gervais uses the video podcast to advertise his and Karl's forthcoming book Ricky Gervais presents The World of Karl Pilkington. While Ricky talks to the camera and behaves with charmless superiority, Karl quietly sits beside him, answers questions, and sketches out some drawings for the book.
3	7 April 2006	This video podcast was an animation of Monkey News from the seventh episode of Podcast Series 1.
4	24 April 2006	A short acceptance film where Steve presents Ricky with the Aerial award and discusses Ricky's charity contributions.
5	26 April 2006	Ricky Gervais, Stephen Merchant and Karl Pilkington settle down on the sofa to watch Brokeback Mountain, but Karl has trouble understanding how gay relationships work.
6	1 May 2006	Ricky Gervais presents The World of Karl Pilkington, showing the viewers some snippets of what would be going into the book, including visual representations of the famous big headed kids, and the pillow man, one of Karl's favourite freaks.
7	20 May 2006	Beginning with an audio clip from the very first podcast, where Karl tells Ricky and Steve about a run-down stately home, that doubled-up as a mental institution. In this house Karl discovered 3000 flies and a condom, which Ricky and Steve found hilarious and incredulous. In this video, Karl visits the house and shows the world proof that his story wasn't a lie.
8	10 June 2006	Direct from the set of the second series of Extras, Ricky and Steve give an update of how filming is going, while back at Ricky's house, Karl is hoovering when he discovers some illustrations for a new Flanimals book, Flanimals of the Deep, providing some of his challenging opinions of animal and flanimal life.
9	24 July 2006	Karl spends four minutes complaining about how spoilt Ricky's cat Ollie is. The podcast includes clips of when Jonathan Ross gave Ricky the cat on his chat show.
10	9 August 2006	Ricky, Steve and Karl catch up after their summer apart and spend a little time daydreaming.
11	1 September 2006	A short trailer advertising Extras series 2.
12	1 September 2006	A second short trailer advertising Extras series 2.
13	7 September 2006	The video begins with an audio clip from Podcast Series 1, Episode 6 where Karl talks about how there is too much choice in restaurants now and people are now taking risks with what they eat. Afterwards a clip is shown of Karl cooking breakfast and elaborating on the conversation played previously.
14	Unknown date	A short trailer advertising the book, The World of Karl Pilkington.

=== Specials ===
Several special video podcasts have been released, most of which to promote Ricky's Fame tour.

#	Date	Overview
Fame 1	29 June 2007	This is an advert starring Ricky, wearing the same attire as he did for his shorts promoting Live 8, using the same white background.
Fame 2	29 June 2007	Ricky gets Robin some sportswear in preparation for his new training regime, and then laughs at him in it, on the treadmill, and running up a hill.
Fame 3	11 July 2007	Ricky takes Robin to the beach for his birthday, and gets someone to dig him a 'swimming pool' to sit in whilst the tide rises. Ricky constantly reminds Robin how lucky he is to have his own swimming pool and be at the beach, in February.
Fame 4	13 July 2007	Ricky and Steve bring news of the Extras Special, which turns into a talk about how the viewers aren't to be respected. Profanities abound.
Fame 5	18 July 2007	Karl gets bothered by builders whilst working on his book, Ricky kindly offers his house as a refuge. One part of this podcast memorably has Ricky trying to vacuum Karl's face.
Fame 6	18 July 2007	Ricky back to annoying Robin again, finishing with Ricky repeatedly running around the house, singing the Tufty Lovely Song.
Fame 7	30 July 2007	Robin surprises Ricky during his live standup by walking onto the stage and presenting him with a children's book award for Flanimals, and giving him a live feed to the awards show whilst his own audience watches on.
Special	6 December 2007	A special podcast entitled "The real extras." It shows Karl on the set of Extras.

== Television series ==
The Ricky Gervais Show podcasts and audiobooks have been developed into The Ricky Gervais Show animated television series, produced for and broadcast by American channel HBO. The TV series consists of audio from past podcasts and audiobooks, with animation drawn in a style similar to classic era Hanna-Barbera cartoons, presenting jokes and situations in a literal context.

The animated Ricky Gervais Show has aired three 13-episode series since it premiered in the United States on 19 February 2010. The third series started on 20 April 2012. On 16 June 2012, Ricky Gervais announced he has decided not to do a fourth season. All three series have been released on DVD, and the entire series has been made available in HD from streaming services, including Amazon Prime.

== See also ==
- The Ricky Gervais Show
- Ricky Gervais
- Stephen Merchant
- Karl Pilkington
