= Monorail =

Railway with a single rail or beam

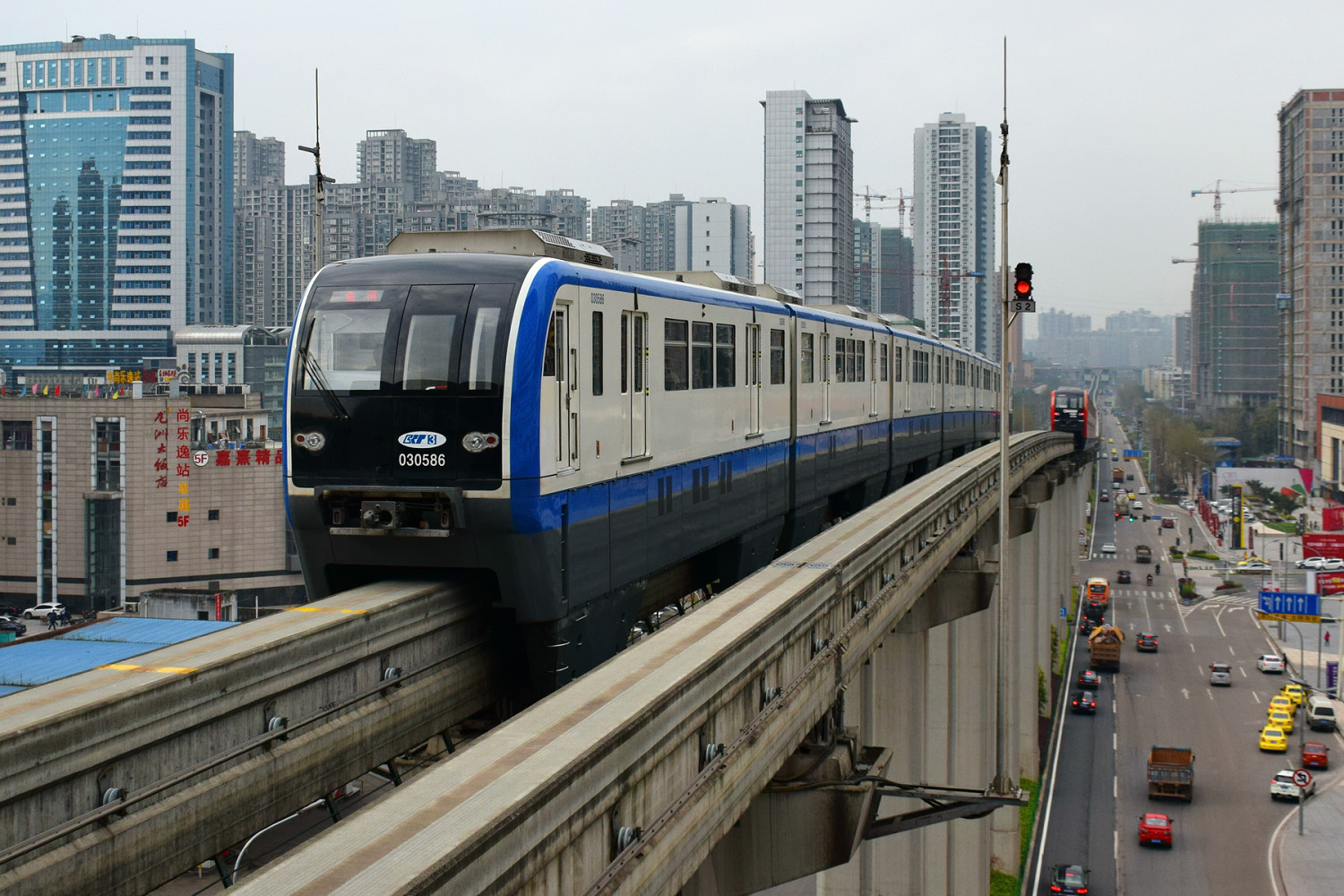
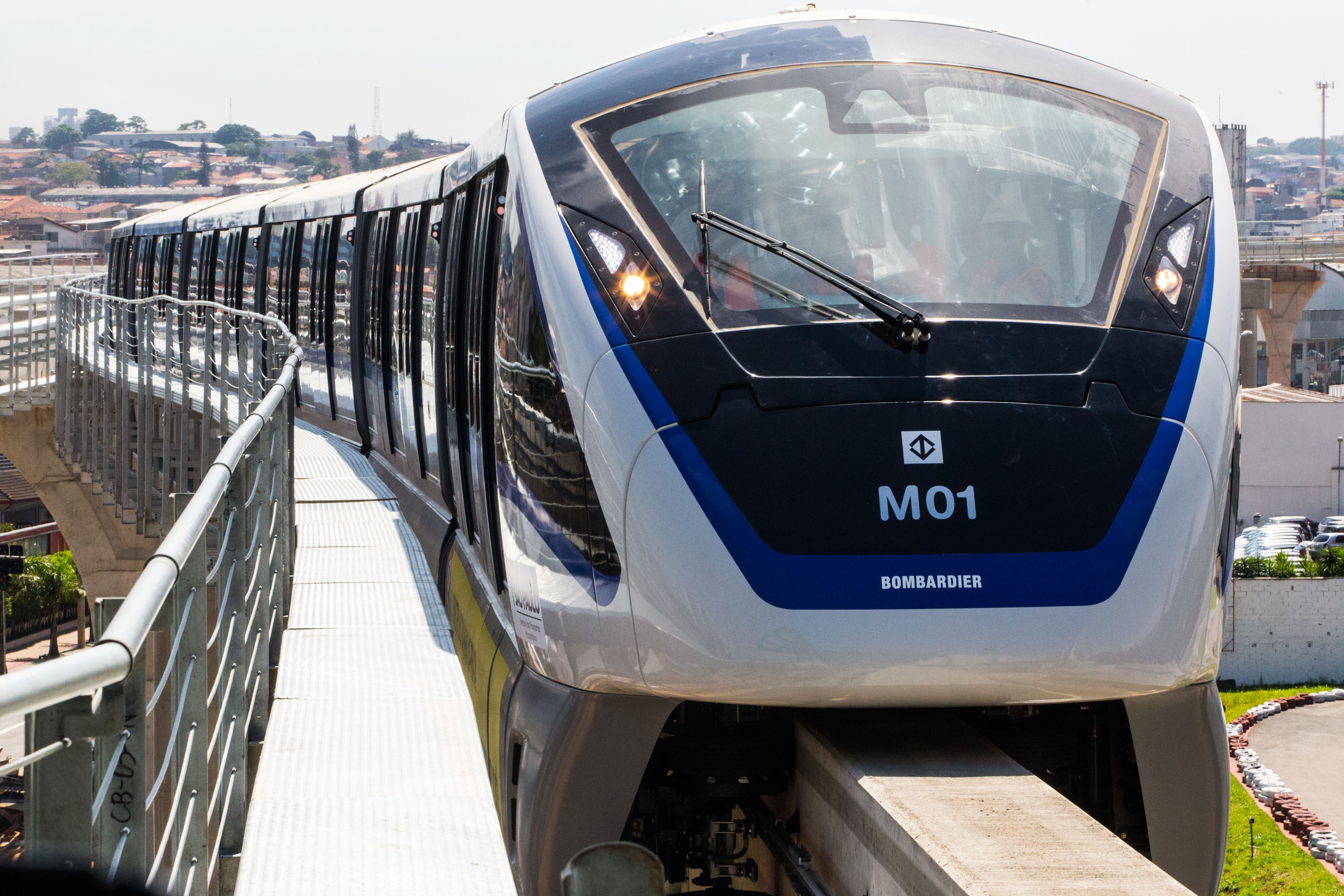
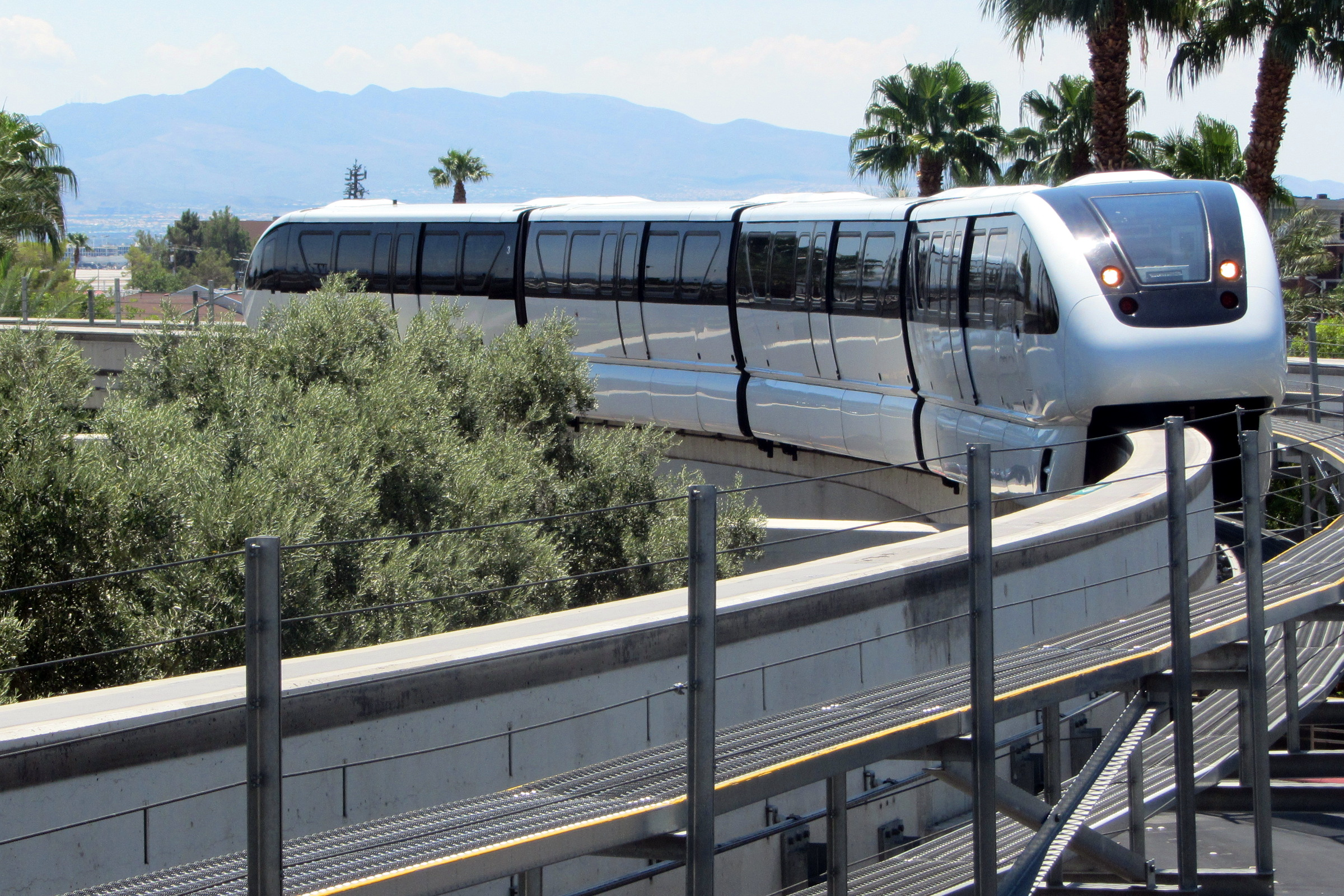
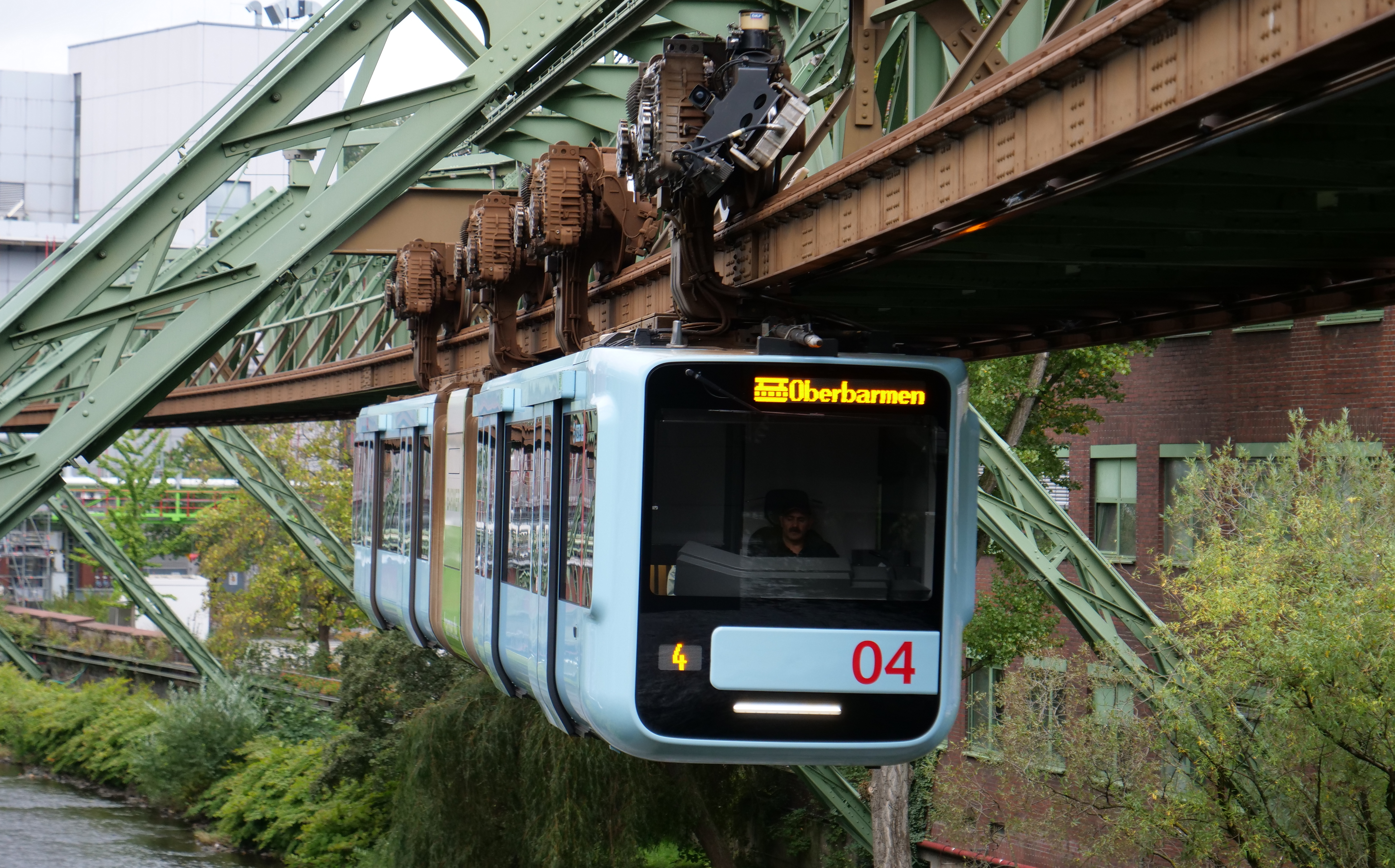
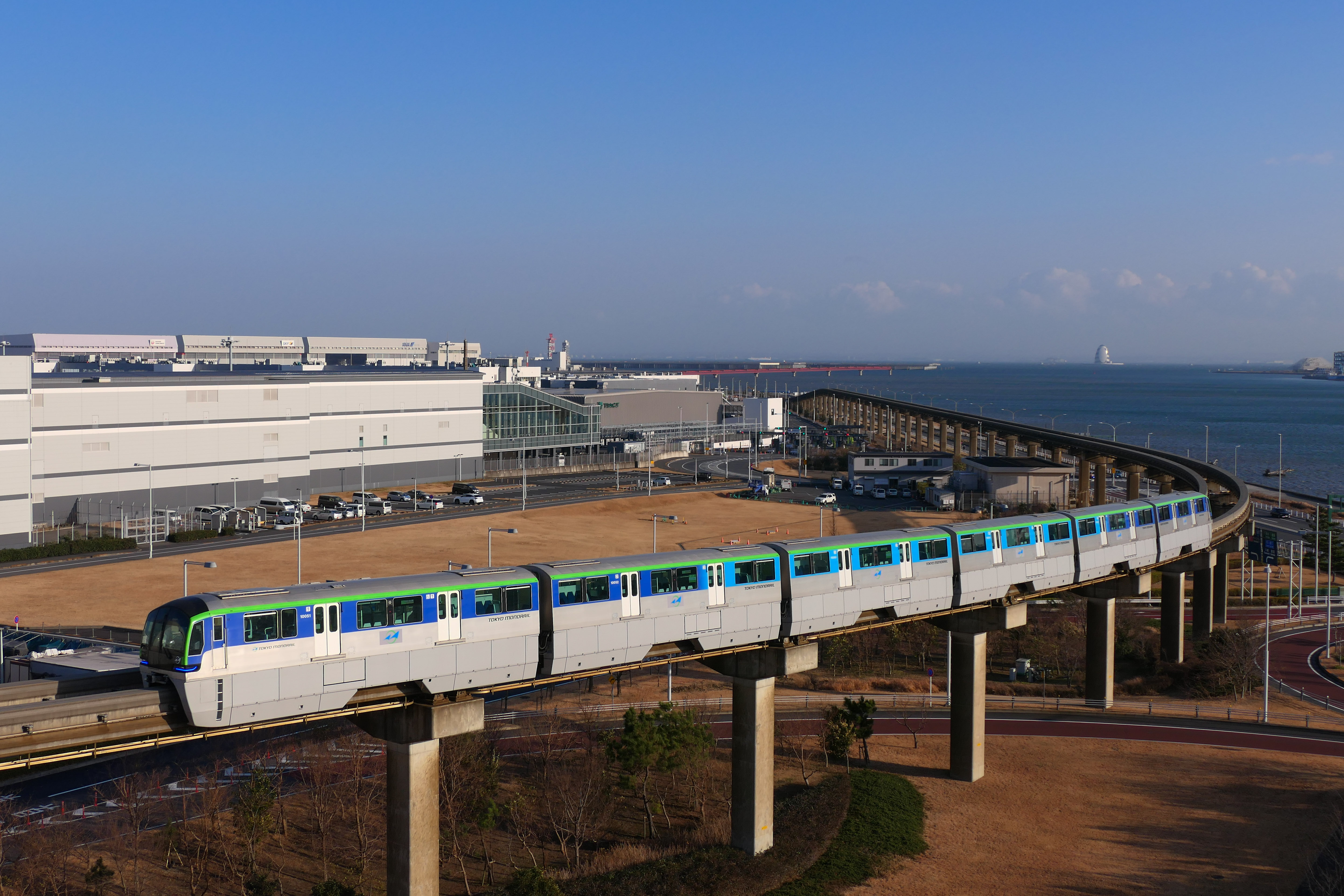
From top, left to right: Chongqing Rail Transit has the longest and busiest monorail system in the world, with Line 3 being the longest and busiest single monorail line; São Paulo Metro Line 15 is the longest and busiest monorail line in the Americas, and second worldwide; a Mark VI train on the Las Vegas Monorail; a suspension railway of the Wuppertal Schwebebahn system; a Tokyo Monorail 10000 series train passing through Haneda Airport.

A monorail is a form of urban rail transit in which trains run on or are suspended from a single rail or beam. Monorails typically provide intermediate transport capacity, generally greater than trams and less than heavy metro systems. The term is often applied colloquially to any elevated rail or people mover, though it refers more precisely to the single-beam track structure. (Note: The term "track" is used here for simplicity. Technically the monorail sits on or is suspended from a guideway containing a singular structure. There is an additional generally accepted rule that the support for the car must be narrower than the car.)

Two principal types exist: straddle-beam monorails, in which vehicles ride atop a concrete or steel beam, and suspended monorails, in which vehicles hang beneath the guideway. The straddle-beam design, descended from the ALWEG system of the 1950s, dominates modern installations; suspended systems remain in service on the Wuppertal Schwebebahn (1901, the oldest monorail in operation) and the Chiba Urban Monorail (the largest suspended network). Monorail systems are most frequently implemented in large cities, airports, and theme parks.

Early monorail experiments date to the 1820s, with the first load-bearing systems appearing in the late 19th century. Modern mass-transit monorails emerged in the second half of the 20th century, principally in Japan, where Tokyo Monorail has carried over 1.5 billion passengers since 1964. Chongqing Rail Transit in China operates the world's largest and busiest monorail system, with Line 3 alone carrying over 680,000 passengers per day. Monorails are also used in airport shuttle services, niche applications including agriculture and mining, and amusement parks. Monorail systems have been depicted extensively in popular culture, from the "Fahrenheit 451" film (1966) to The Simpsons episode "Marge vs. the Monorail" (1993), which the Monorail Society has credited with shaping negative public perceptions of the technology.

== Etymology ==
The term possibly originated in 1897 from German engineer Eugen Langen, who called an elevated railway system with wagons suspended the "Eugen Langen One-railed Suspension Tramway" (Einschieniges Hängebahnsystem Eugen Langen).

== Differentiation from other transport systems ==
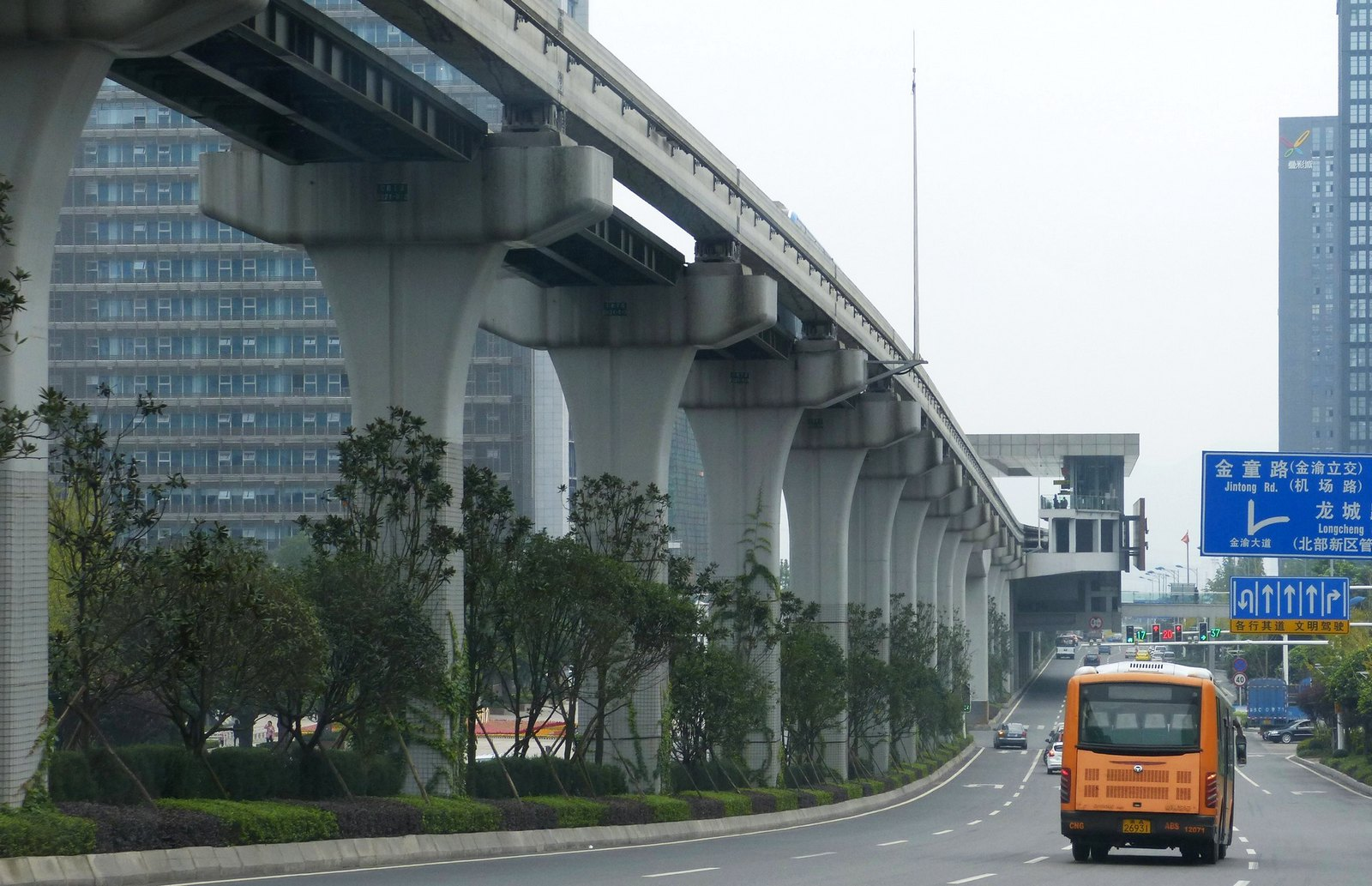
Monorail on concrete columns in Chongqing, China

Monorails have found applications in airport transfers and medium-capacity metros. To differentiate monorails from other transport modes, the Monorail Society defines a monorail as a "single rail serving as a track for passenger or freight vehicles. In most cases, rail is elevated, but monorails can also run at grade, below grade, or in subway tunnels. Vehicles either are suspended from or straddle a narrow guide way. Monorail vehicles are wider than the guideway that supports them."

=== Similarities ===
Monorails are often elevated, sometimes leading to confusion with other elevated systems such as the Docklands Light Railway, Vancouver SkyTrain, the AirTrain JFK and cable-propelled systems like the Cable Liner people mover, which run on two rails.

Monorail vehicles often appear similar to light rail vehicles and can be staffed or unstaffed. They can be individual rigid vehicles, articulated single units, or multiple units coupled into trains. Like other advanced rapid transit systems, monorails can be driven by linear induction motors; like conventional railways, vehicle bodies can be connected to the beam via bogies, allowing curves to be negotiated.

Monorails are sometimes used in urban areas alongside conventional parallel-railed metro systems. Mumbai Monorail serves alongside Mumbai Metro, while monorail lines are integrated with conventional rail rapid transit lines in Bangkok's MRT network.

=== Differences ===
Unlike some trams and light rail systems, modern monorails are always separated from other traffic and pedestrians due to the geometry of the rail. They are both guided and supported via interaction with the same single beam, in contrast to other guided systems like rubber-tyred metros, such as the Sapporo Municipal Subway, or guided buses or trams, such as Translohr. Monorails can also use pantographs.

As with other grade-separated transit systems, monorails avoid red lights, intersection turns, and traffic jams. Surface-level trains, buses, cars, and pedestrians can collide with one another, while vehicles on dedicated, grade-separated rights-of-way such as monorails can collide only with other vehicles on the same system, with far fewer opportunities for collision. As with other elevated transit systems, monorail passengers receive sunlight and views. Monorails can be quieter than diesel buses and trains. They obtain electricity from the track structure, whereas other modes of transit may use either third rail or overhead power lines and poles. Compared to the elevated train systems of New York, Chicago, and elsewhere, a monorail beamway casts a narrower shadow.

Conversely, monorails can be more expensive than light-rail systems that do not include tunnels. In addition, monorails must either remain above ground or use larger tunnels than conventional rail systems, and they require complex track-switching equipment.

=== Maglev ===
Under the Monorail Society's beam-width criterion, some, but not all, maglev systems are considered monorails, such as the Transrapid and Linimo. Maglevs differ from other monorails in that they do not physically contact the beam while moving.

== History ==
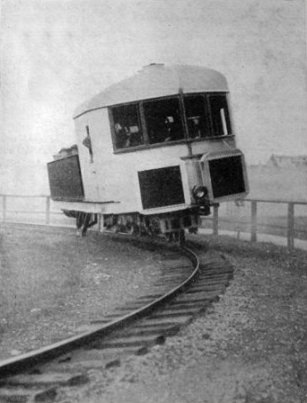
Gyroscopically balanced monorail (1909) by Brennan and Scherl

=== Early years ===
The first monorail prototype was made in Russia in 1820 by Ivan Elmanov. Attempts at creating monorail alternatives to conventional railroads have been made since the early part of the 19th century.

The Centennial Monorail was featured at the Centennial Exposition in Philadelphia in 1876. Based on its design the Bradford and Foster Brook Railway was built in 1877 and ran for one year from January 1878 until January 1879.

Around 1879 a "one-rail" system was proposed independently by Haddon and by Stringfellow, which used an inverted "V" rail (and thus shaped like "Λ" in cross-section). It was intended for military use, but was also seen to have civilian use as a "cheap railway". Similarly, one of the first systems put into practical use was that of French engineer Charles Lartigue, who built a line between Ballybunion and Listowel in Ireland, opened in 1888 and lasting 36 years, being closed in 1924 (due to damage from Ireland's Civil War). It used a load-bearing single rail and two lower, external rails for balance, the three carried on triangular supports. It was cheap to construct but tricky to operate. Possibly the first monorail locomotive was a 0-3-0 steam locomotive on this line. A high-speed monorail using the Lartigue system was proposed in 1901 between Liverpool and Manchester.

The Boynton Bicycle Railroad was a steam-powered monorail in Brooklyn on Long Island, New York. It ran on a single load-bearing rail at ground level, but with a wooden overhead stabilizing rail engaged by a pair of horizontally opposed wheels. The railroad operated for only two years beginning in 1890.

The Hotchkiss Bicycle Railroad was a monorail on which a matching pedal bicycle could be ridden. The first example was built between Smithville and Mount Holly, New Jersey, in 1892. It closed in 1897. Other examples were built in Norfolk from 1895 to 1909, Great Yarmouth, and Blackpool, UK, from 1896.

=== 1900s–1950s ===
Early designs used a double-flanged single metal rail alternative to the double rail of conventional railways, both guiding and supporting the monorail car. A surviving suspended version is the oldest system still in service: the Wuppertal monorail in Germany. Also in the early 1900s, gyro monorails with cars gyroscopically balanced on top of a single rail were tested, but never developed beyond the prototype stage. The Ewing System, used in the Patiala State Monorail Trainways in Punjab, India, relies on a hybrid model with a load-bearing single rail and an external wheel for balance. A high-speed monorail using the Lartigue system was proposed in 1901 between Liverpool and Manchester.

In 1910, the Brennan gyroscopic monorail was considered for use to a coal mine in Alaska. In June 1920, the French Patent Office published FR 503782, by Henri Coanda, on a "Transporteur Aérien" (Air Carrier). One of the first monorails planned in the United States was in New York City in the early 1930s, scrubbed for an elevated train system.

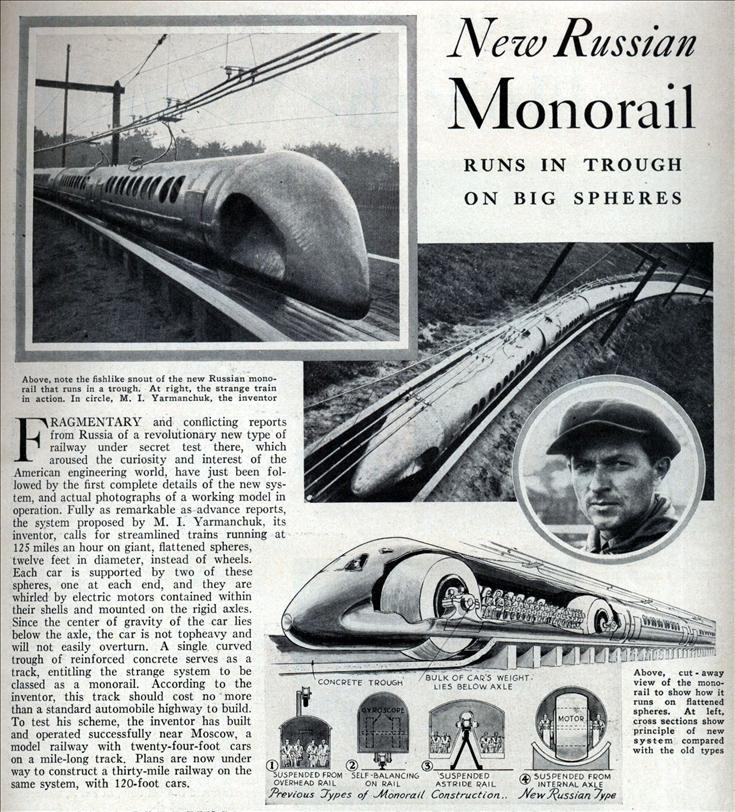
"Popular Science" February 1934, p. 41: "A new Russian type of monorail that runs in a chute on large spheres."

The first half of the 20th century saw many further proposed designs that either never left the drawing board or remained short-lived prototypes. Another project created on the layout was the ball-bearing train by Nikolai Grigorievich Yarmolchuk. This train moved on spherical wheels with electric motors embedded in them, which were located in semi-circular chutes under a wooden platform (in the full-scale project the trestle would have been concrete). A model train, built to 1/5 scale to test the vehicle concept, was capable of reaching speeds of up to 70 km/h. The full-scale project was expected to reach speeds of up to 300 km/h.

=== 1950s–1980s ===
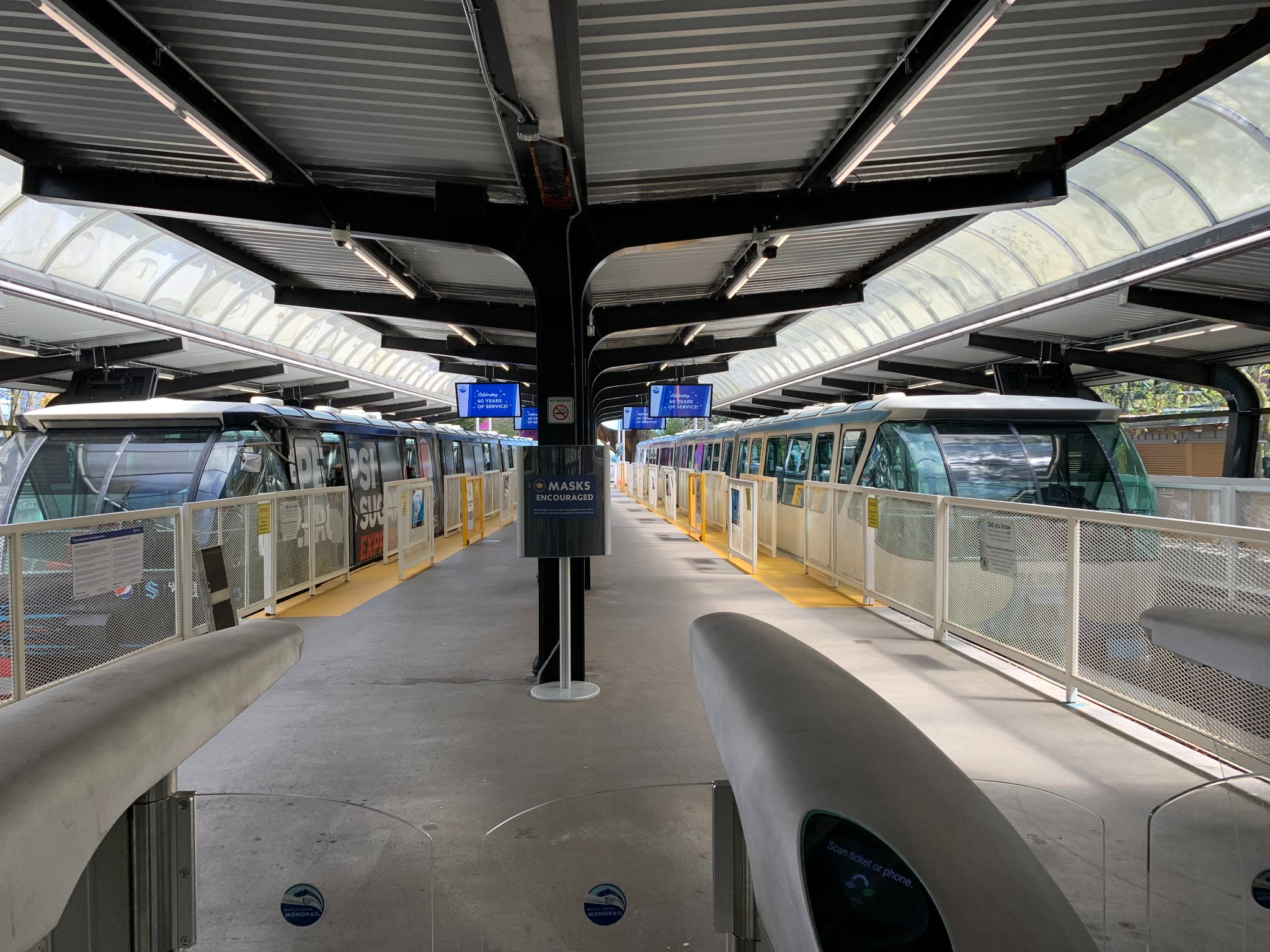
Seattle Monorail, built in 1962 and still using the original ALWEG trains

In the latter half of the 20th century, monorails had settled on using larger beam- or girder-based track, with vehicles supported by one set of wheels and guided by another. In the 1950s, a 40% scale prototype of a system designed for speed of 200 mph (320 km/h) on straight stretches and 90 mph (140 km/h) on curves was built in Germany. There were designs with vehicles supported, suspended, or cantilevered from the beams. In the 1950s the ALWEG straddle design emerged, followed by an updated suspended type, the SAFEGE system. Versions of ALWEG's technology are used by the two largest monorail manufacturers, Hitachi Monorail and Bombardier.

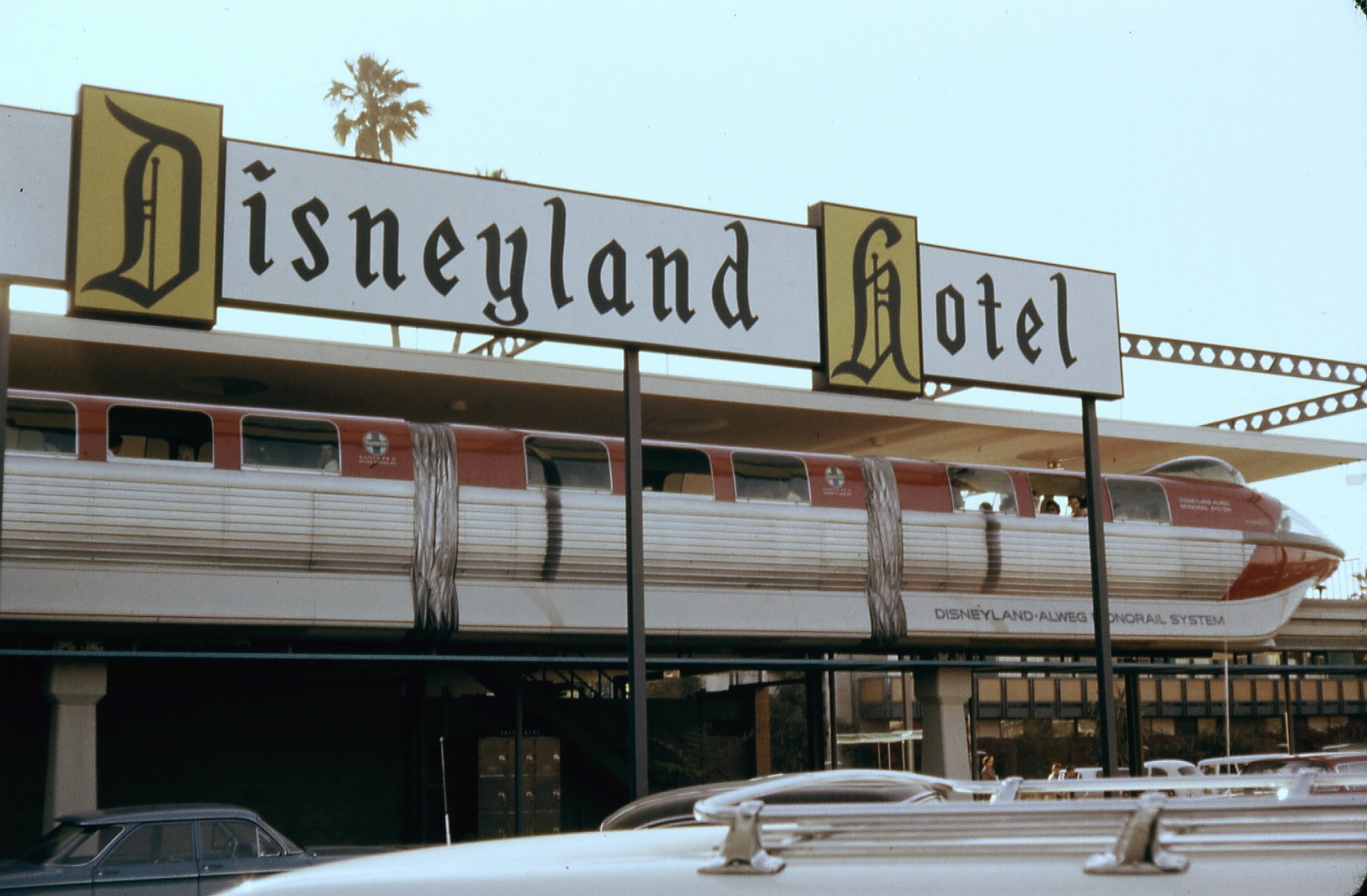
The original Red Mark I Disneyland Monorail, with the additional car to make it a Mark II, as seen at the Disneyland Hotel station in August 1963

In 1956, the first monorail to operate in the US began test operations in Houston, Texas. Disneyland in Anaheim, California, opened the United States' first daily operating monorail system in 1959. Later during this period, additional monorails were installed at Walt Disney World in Florida, Seattle, and in Japan. Monorails were promoted as futuristic technology with exhibition installations and amusement park purchases, as seen by the legacy systems in use today. However, monorails gained little foothold compared to conventional transport systems. In March 1972, Alejandro Goicoechea-Omar had patent DE1755198 published, on a "Vertebrate Train", built as an experimental track in Las Palmas de Gran Canaria, Spain. Niche private enterprise uses for monorails emerged, with the emergence of air travel and shopping malls, with shuttle-type systems being built.

=== 1980s–present ===
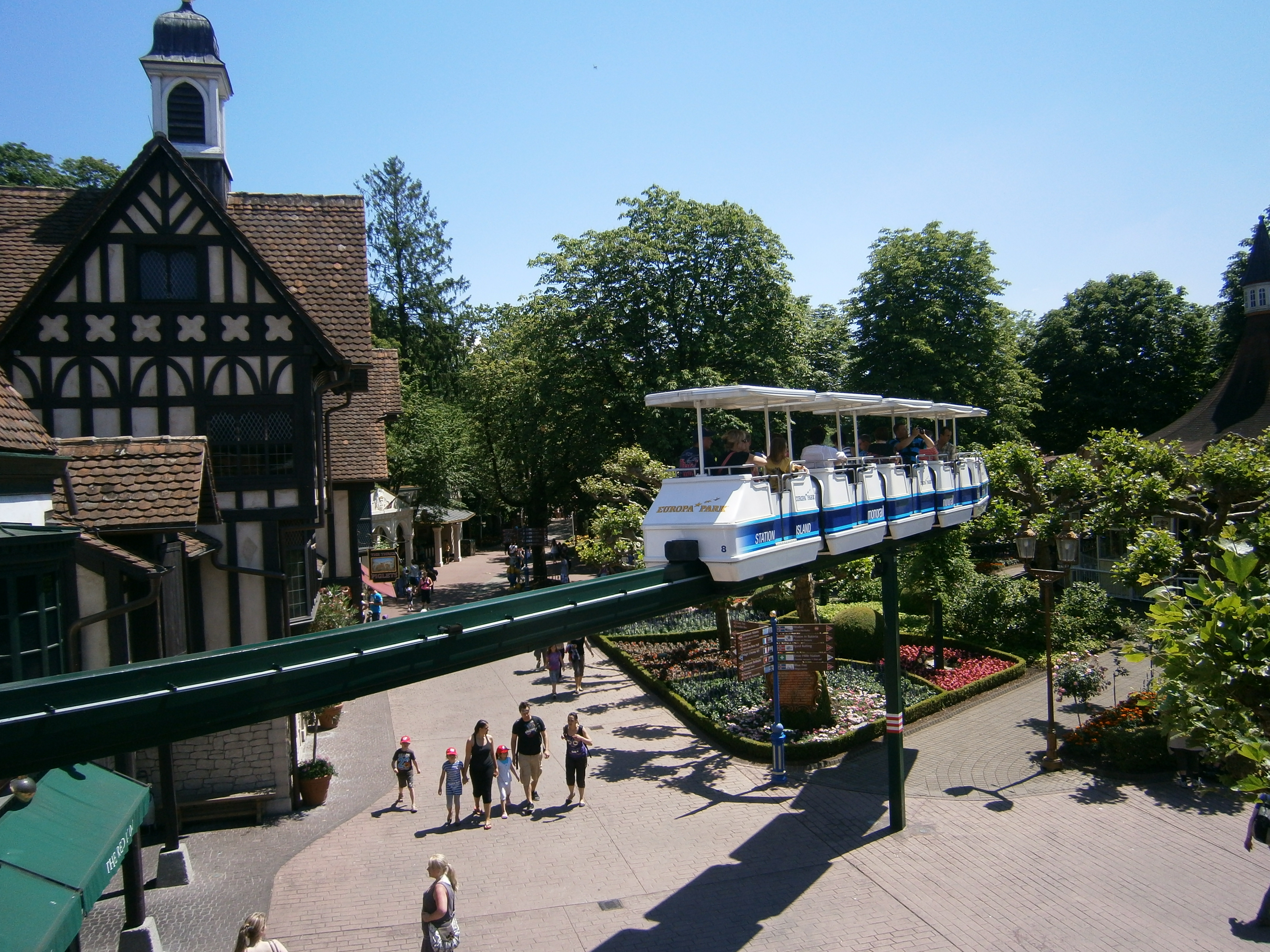
One of three monorails at Europa-Park in Rust, Germany

From the 1980s, most monorail mass transit systems have been in Japan, with a few exceptions. Tokyo Monorail is one of the world's busiest, averaging 127,000 passengers per day and having served over 1.5 billion passengers since 1964. China began development of monorails in the late 2000s and is already home to the world's largest and busiest monorail system. A Bombardier Innovia Monorail-based system was opened in Wuhu in 2021, becoming China's first fully automated driverless monorail. By contrast, several "Cloudrail" systems developed by BYD that were under construction in cities such as Guilin and Anyang were left unfinished after central authorities tightened approval and debt rules for urban rail transit with Document No. 52 in 2018. This prompted a shift towards lighter automated systems, such as BYD's SkyShuttle. Monorails have seen continuing use in niche shuttle markets and amusement parks.

Modern mass transit monorail systems use developments of the ALWEG beam and tire approach, with only two suspended types in large use. Monorail configurations have also been adopted by maglev trains. Since the 2000s, with the rise of traffic congestion and urbanization, there has been a resurgence of interest in the technology for public transport, with a number of cities such as Malta and Istanbul investigating monorails as a possible mass transit solution.

In 2004, Chongqing Rail Transit in China adopted a unique ALWEG-based design with rolling stock that is much wider than most monorails, with capacity comparable to heavy rail. This is because Chongqing is criss-crossed by numerous hills, mountains, and rivers, making tunneling infeasible except in some cases (for example, lines 1 and 6) due to the extreme depth involved. Today it is the largest and busiest monorail system in the world.

In July 2009, two Walt Disney World monorails collided, killing one of the drivers and injuring seven passengers. The National Transportation Safety Board found the cause of the accident to be human error by both the driver and controller, contributed to by a lack of standard operating procedures.

São Paulo, Brazil, is building two high-capacity monorail lines as part of its public transportation network. Line 15 was partially opened in 2014, will be 27 km (17 mi) long when completed and has a capacity of 40,000 pphpd using Bombardier Innovia Monorail trains. Line 17 opened its initial section in 2026; it will be 17.7 km (11.0 mi) long and is using the BYD SkyRail design. Other significant monorail systems opened in recent years include two lines for the MRT (Bangkok) in 2023 and the first line of the Cairo Monorail in 2026.

== Types and technical aspects ==
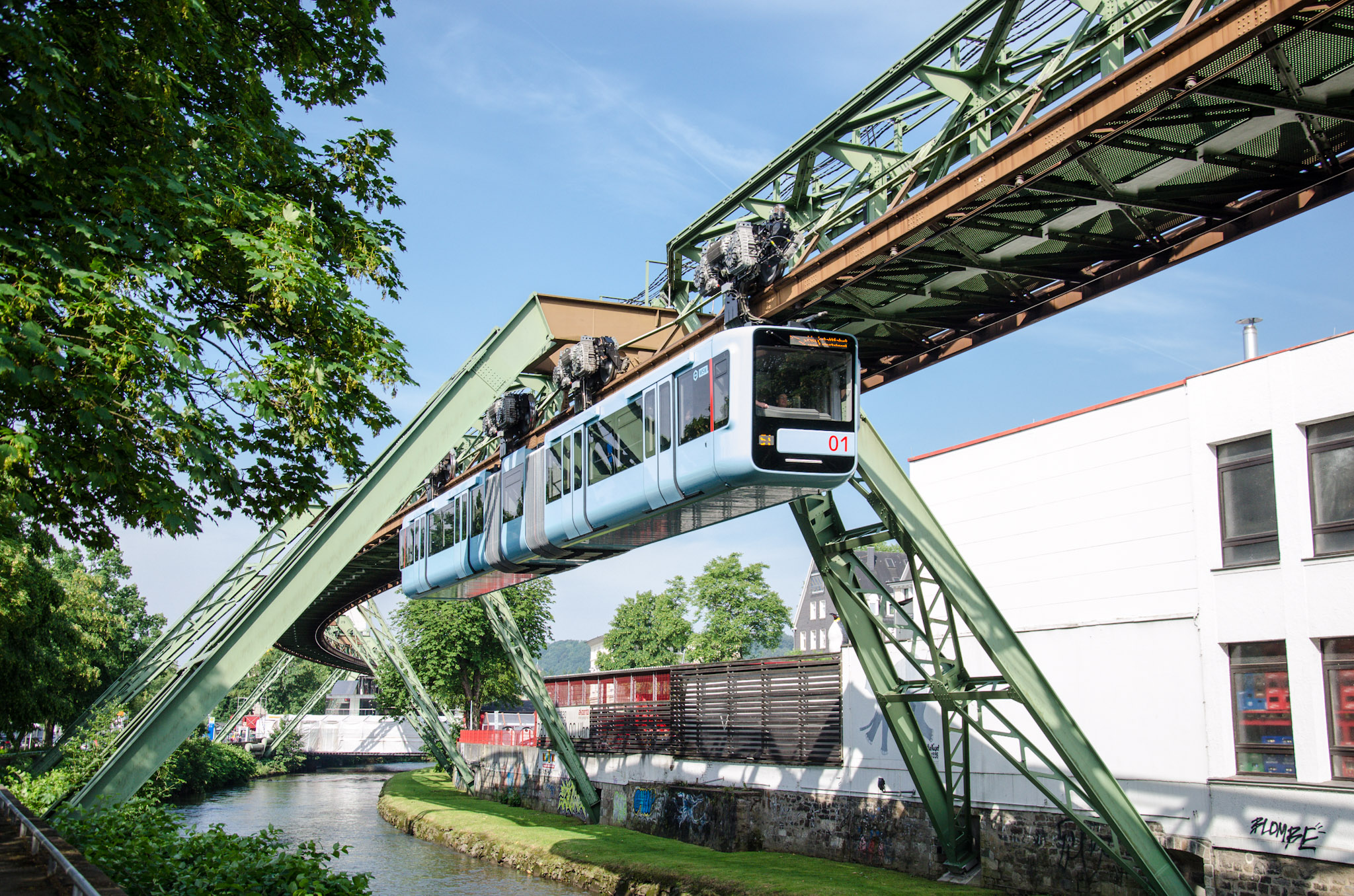
The Wuppertal Schwebebahn, the world's first electric suspended monorail

Modern monorails depend on a large solid beam as the vehicles' running surface. There are a number of competing designs divided into two broad classes, "straddle-beam" and "suspended" monorails. The most common type is the straddle-beam, in which the train straddles a steel or reinforced concrete beam 2 to 3 feet (0.6 to 0.9 m) wide. A rubber-tired carriage contacts the beam on the top and both sides for traction and to stabilize the vehicle. The style was popularized by the German company ALWEG. There is also a historical type of "suspension monorail" developed by German inventors Nicolaus Otto and Eugen Langen in the 1880s. It was built in the twin cities of Barmen and Elberfeld in Wuppertal, Germany, opened in 1901, and is still in operation. The Chiba Urban Monorail is the world's largest suspended network.

=== Power ===
Almost all modern monorails are powered by electric motors fed by dual third rails, contact wires, or electrified channels attached to or enclosed in their guidance beams. Historically some systems, such as the Lartigue Monorail, used steam locomotives, but diesel-powered monorail systems also existed. Some monorail systems use linear induction motors, for example Disney's Tomorrowland Monorail.

=== Magnetic levitation ===
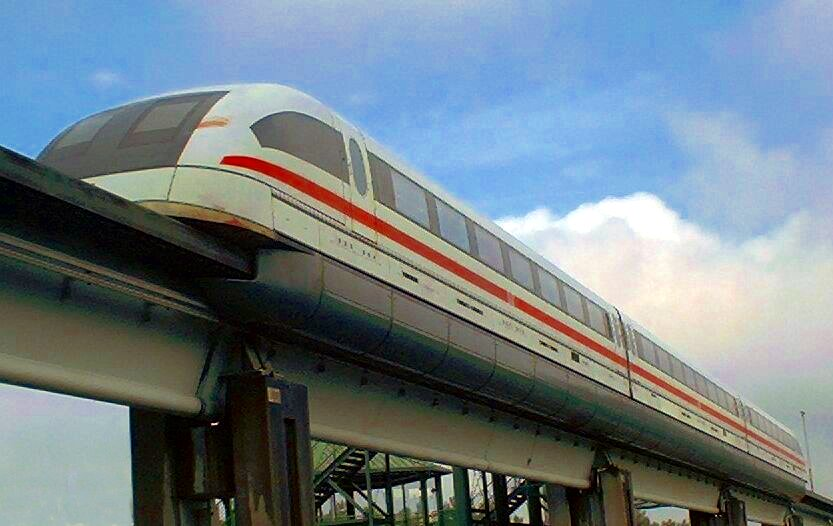
Transrapid maglev on monorail track

Magnetic levitation train (maglev) systems such as the German Transrapid were built as straddle-type monorails. The Shanghai Maglev Train runs in commercial operation at 430 km/h (270 mph), and there are also slower maglev monorails intended for urban transport in Japan (Linimo), Korea (Incheon Airport Maglev), and China (Beijing Subway Line S1 and the Changsha Maglev Express). However, it is argued that the larger width of the guideway for the maglevs makes it not legitimate to call them monorails.

=== Switching ===
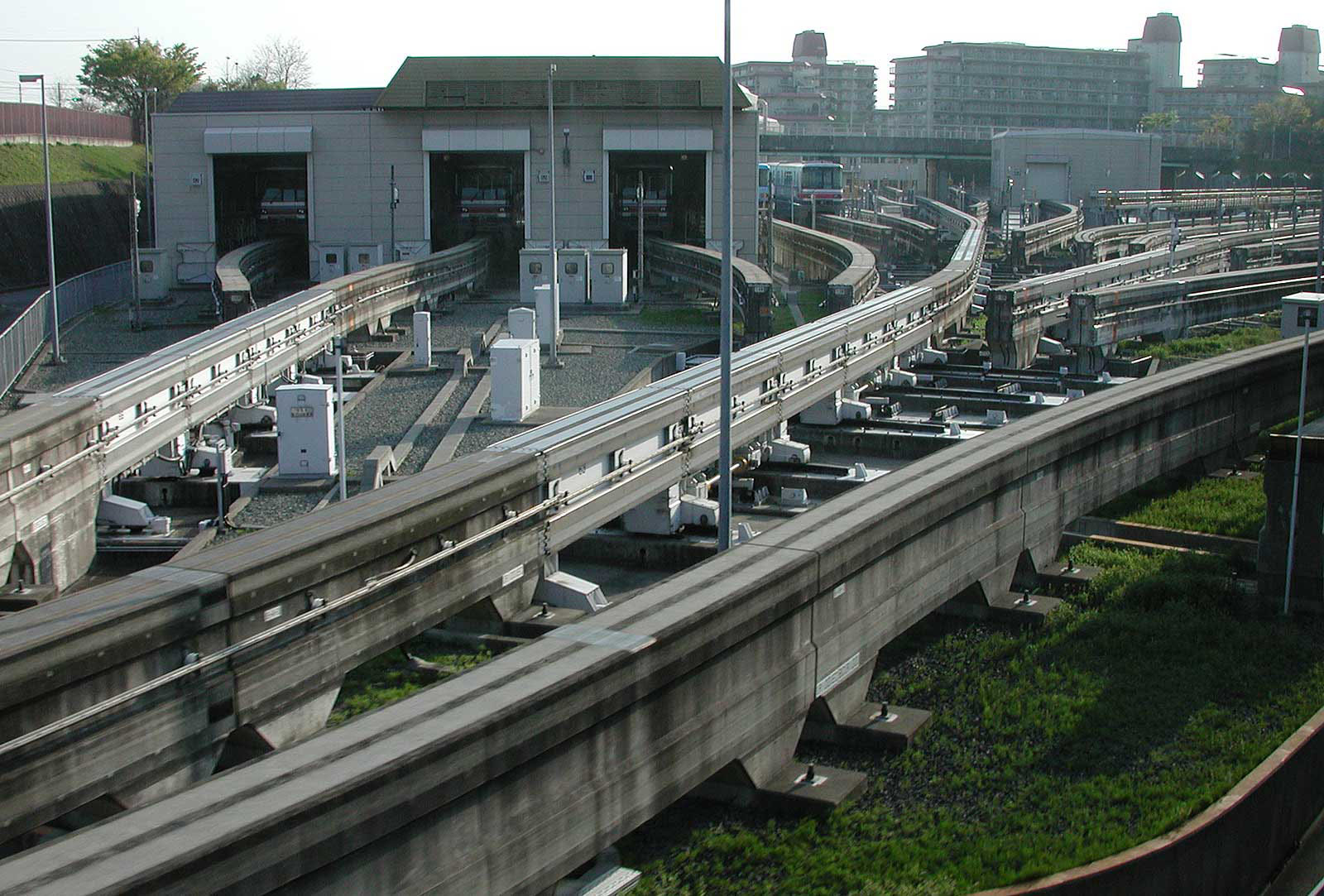
Switches at a storage facility of Osaka Monorail

Switching in monorail systems varies by design and technology. One of the earliest systems, the Wuppertal Suspension Railway in Germany, uses vehicles suspended beneath a single elevated rail, with steel wheels running on top. Due to the design of the cars, switching required a complex rotating mechanism that physically turned the track structure. As a result, the system operates without bypasses or spur lines, with a loop at either end to turn trains around.

The mechanical complexity and limitations of early switching systems contributed to the perception that monorails are generally inflexible or unsuited for branching routes. However, modern monorail technologies have introduced a variety of switching methods that address these limitations.

For suspended monorails, newer designs such as those used by SAFEGE and H-Bahn systems incorporate internal pivoting components. These systems use movable plates within the guideway to change direction without moving the entire beam, allowing for more compact and efficient switches.

A switch changing direction on São Paulo Metro Line 15

Straddle-beam monorails employ either segmented or beam-moving switching systems. The segmented switch, developed by ALWEG in the 1950s and still in use in Japan, uses flexible beam sections that can shift between straight and curved alignments, requiring relatively little space and enabling faster switching. Another method, known as the beam replacement switch, involves moving a straight beam section aside while a curved beam section moves into place and is capable of completing a switch in approximately 12 seconds.

Rotary switches have a straight beam and a curved beam on either side of a plate, which can rotate 180 degrees.

In addition to these switching mechanisms, some systems use turntables or transfer tables at maintenance facilities or depots. These allow vehicles to be redirected to and from storage or service lines.

=== Grades ===
Rubber-tired monorails are typically designed to cope with a 6% grade. Rubber-tired light rail or metro lines can cope with similar or greater grades – for example, the Lausanne Metro has grades of up to 12% and the Montreal Metro up to 6.5%, while VAL systems can handle 7% grades.

== Monorail systems ==
Manufacturers of monorail rolling stock with operating systems include Hitachi Monorail, BYD, Bombardier Transportation (now Alstom), Scomi, PBTS (a joint venture of CRRC Nanjing Puzhen and Bombardier), Intamin, and EMTC.

Other developers include CRRC Qingdao Sifang, China Railway Science and Industry Group, Zhongtang Air Rail Technology, Woojin, and SkyWay Group.

=== Records ===
As of 2014, notable monorail records include:

- Busiest line: Line 3, Chongqing Rail Transit, 682,800 passengers per day (2014 daily average)
- Largest system: Chongqing Rail Transit (Lines 2 and 3), 97.8 km (60.8 mi)
- Longest straddle-beam line: Line 3, Chongqing Rail Transit, 55.5 km (34.5 mi), or 66.5 km (41.3 mi) including the Jurenba branch
- Largest suspended system: Chiba Urban Monorail, 15.2 km (9.4 mi)
- Oldest line still in service: Schwebebahn Wuppertal, 1901

== In popular culture ==
François Truffaut's 1966 film adaptation of Ray Bradbury's 1953 novel "Fahrenheit 451" contains suspended monorail exterior scenes filmed at the French SAFEGE test track in Châteauneuf-sur-Loire near Orléans, France (since dismantled).

The "Thunderbirds" episode "Brink of Disaster" (February 1966) is about the financing and building of a high-speed driverless cross-country monorail project. Two of the Thunderbirds crew find themselves trapped aboard a monorail train, with no possibility of escape, when it is discovered the train is speeding toward a stricken bridge.

The James Bond film franchise features monorails in three films, all belonging to the villain. In "You Only Live Twice" (1967) there is a working ground-level monorail inside the SPECTRE volcano base. In "Live and Let Die" (1973), a prop monorail is shown in the villain's lair on the fictional Caribbean island of San Monique. In "The Spy Who Loved Me" (1977) there is a working monorail on the villain's supertanker (submarine dock).

In 1987, Lego released a monorail among the "Futuron" Space line. Despite being the most expensive Lego set of its time (due to being massive and including electrical elements), it was very popular, with Lego releasing a "Town" themed monorail in 1990 and another Space monorail in 1994 among the "Unitron" line, as well as additional track. The monorail system was also prominent in the unreleased "Seatron" Space line and prototype "Wild West" sets. Its popularity has endured over thirty years later, with Lego paying homage in promotional sets and fans manufacturing compatible components.

The fourth season of the American animated television show "The Simpsons" features the episode "Marge vs. the Monorail", in which the town of Springfield impulsively purchases a faulty monorail from a confidence trickster at a wildly inflated price. The Monorail Society, an organization with 14,000 members worldwide, has blamed the episode for sullying the reputation of monorails, to which "Simpsons" creator Matt Groening responded "That's a by-product of our viciousness... Monorails are great, so it makes me sad, but at the same time if something's going to happen in "The Simpsons", it's going to go wrong, right?"

The 2005 feature film "Batman Begins" features a monorail, constructed by Bruce Wayne's father through Gotham City, that is part of the climax of the film. The monorail is also included in the spin-off video game.

Blaine the Mono is a train featured in Stephen King's "The Dark Tower" series of books and first appears in "The Dark Tower III: The Waste Lands".

Monorails have also appeared in a number of video games including "Transport Tycoon", "Japanese Rail Sim 3D: Monorail Trip to Okinawa" by Sonic Powered, "SimCity 4: Rush Hour", "Cities in Motion 2", "Cities: Skylines" (in the "Mass Transit" expansion pack of 2017), "Planet Zoo", and a rideable elevated monorail system in the 2020 video game "Cyberpunk 2077".

=== Public perception as mass transit ===
From 1950 to 1980, the monorail concept may have suffered, as with all public transport systems, from competition with the automobile. At the time, post–World War II optimism in America was riding high and people were buying automobiles in large numbers due to suburbanization and the Interstate Highway System. Monorails in particular may have suffered from the reluctance of public transit authorities to invest in the perceived high cost of unproven technology when faced with cheaper mature alternatives. There were also many competing monorail technologies, splitting their case further. One notable example of a public monorail is the AMF Monorail that was used as transportation around the 1964–1965 World's Fair.

This high-cost perception was challenged most notably in 1963 when the ALWEG consortium proposed to finance the construction of a major system in Los Angeles County, California, in return for the right of operation. This was turned down by the Los Angeles County Board of Supervisors under pressure from Standard Oil of California and General Motors (which were strong advocates for automobile dependency), and the later proposed subway system faced criticism by author Ray Bradbury as it had yet to reach the scale of the proposed monorail.

Several monorails initially conceived as transport systems survive on revenues generated from tourism, benefiting from the unique views offered from the largely elevated installations.

== Farm, mining, and logistics applications ==
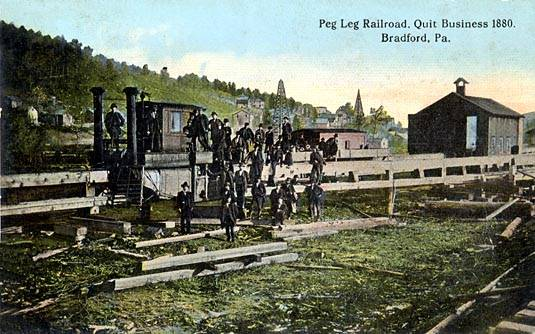
Bradford and Foster Brook Railway, 1880

Monorails have been used for a number of applications other than passenger transportation. Small suspended monorails are also widely used in factories, either as part of movable assembly lines or material handling systems.

=== History ===
Inspired by the Centennial Monorail demonstrated in 1876, in 1877 the Bradford and Foster Brook Railway began construction of a 5 mi (8.0 km) line connecting Bradford and Foster Township, McKean County in Pennsylvania. The line operated from 1878 until 1879 delivering machinery and oil supplies. The first twin-boiler locomotive wore out quickly. It was replaced by a single-boiler locomotive which was too heavy and crashed through the track on its third trip. The third locomotive again had twin boilers. On a trial run one of the boilers ran dry and exploded, killing six people. The railway was closed soon after.

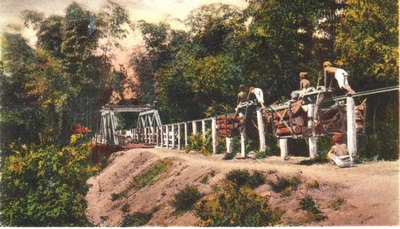
Monorail in the Grobogan area (north of Purwodadi)

Monorails in Central Java were used to transport timber from the forests of Central Java located in the mountains to the rivers. In 1908 and 1909, the forester H. J. L. Beck built a manually operated monorail of limited but sufficient capacity for the transport of small timber and firewood in the Northern Surabaya forest district. In later years, this idea was further developed by L. A. van de Ven, who was a forester in the Grobogan forest district around 1908–1910. Monorails were built by plantation operators and wood processing companies throughout the mountains of Central Java. In 1919/1920, however, the hand-operated monorails gradually disappeared and were replaced by narrow-gauge railways with steam locomotives as forest utilization changed.

In the 1920s the Port of Hamburg used a petrol-powered, suspended monorail to transport luggage and freight from ocean-going vessels to a passenger depot.

In the northern Mojave Desert, the Epsom Salts Monorail was built in 1924. It ran for 28 miles from a connection on the Trona Railway, eastward to harvest epsomite deposits in the Owlshead Mountains. This Lartigue-type monorail achieved gradients of up to ten percent. It only operated until June 1926, when the mineral deposits became uneconomic, and was dismantled for scrap in the late 1930s.

In the Soviet Union the Lyskovsky monorail in the Nizhny Novgorod region was designed by the engineer of the timber industry Ivan Gorodtsov. A Lartigue-type line of about 50 km (31 mi) long was opened in November 1934 to connect the village of Selskaya Maza with the villages of Bakaldy and Yaloksha to carry timber. Following this example, a separate 42 kilometres (26 mi) cargo-and-passenger monorail was built from the town of Bor to the village of Zavrazhnoe, where forest and peat were exploited. The Lyskovsky monorail stopped operating in 1949.

The British firm "Road Machines (Drayton) Ltd" developed a modular-track ground-level monorail system with a 9 in (230 mm) high rail segments, 4 to 12 ft (1.2 to 3.7 m) long, running between support plates. The first system was sold in 1949 and it was used in industrial, construction, and agricultural applications around the world. The company ceased trading in 1967. The system was adapted for use in the 1967 James Bond film "You Only Live Twice". An example of the system exists at the Amberley Museum & Heritage Centre in Britain.

=== Recent applications ===
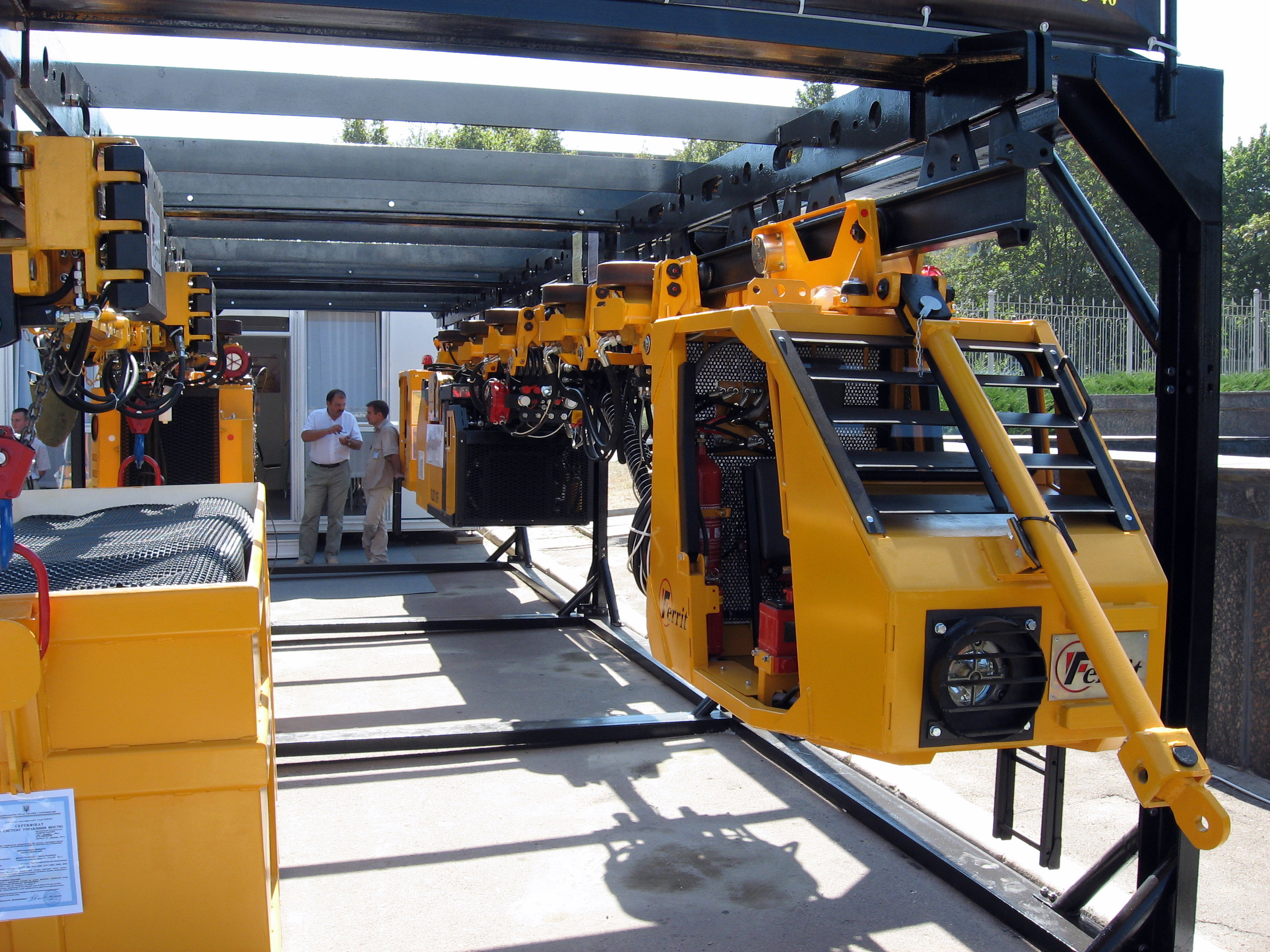
Mining monorail

Very small and lightweight systems are used widely on farms to transport crops such as bananas. First developed in Japan, industrial versions of slope cars are used in agriculture in steep sloped areas such as citrus orchards in Japan and vineyards in Italy. One European manufacturer says they have installed 650 systems worldwide.

In the mining industry, suspended monorails have been used because of their ability to descend and climb steep tunnels using rack-and-pinion drive. This significantly reduces cost and length of tunnels, by up to 60% in some cases, which otherwise must be at gentle gradients to suit road vehicles or conventional railways.

A suspended monorail capable of carrying fully loaded 20' and 40' containers has been under construction since 2020 at the Port of Qingdao, the first phase of which was put into operation in 2021.

== See also ==
- Bennie Railplane
- Gadgetbahn
- Innovia Monorail
- List of monorail systems
- Slope car
