= Peg leg (disambiguation) =

A Peg leg is an artificial leg.

Pegleg, Peg Leg or Peg-Leg may also refer to:

- Richard Lonergan (1900–1925), American mobster and labor racketeer nicknamed "Peg Leg"
- Joe "Pegleg" Morgan (1929–1993), first non-Hispanic member of the Mexican Mafia, an American criminal organization
- Thomas L. Smith (1801–1866), American mountain man
- Daniel "Pegleg" Sullivan, first person to raise the alarm about the Great Chicago Fire of 1871
- Peg-Leg Pete (Disney), a Walt Disney cartoon character
- PegLeg (video game), a 1990s video game for the Macintosh
- Bradford and Foster Brook Railway, also known as the "Peg Leg" from its wooden support piles
- Fulton Chain Railroad (Peg Leg), also known as the "Peg Leg" from its wooden rails
- Peg Leg (album), a 1978 album by Ron Carter
- Peglegs, the sports teams of Stuyvesant High School, New York City

== See also ==
- John Bell Hood (1831–1879), Confederate American Civil War general called "Old Pegleg" by his men
- Cornelis Jol (1597–1641), Dutch corsair and Dutch West India Company admiral nicknamed Houtebeen ("pegleg")
- Blas de Lezo (1689–1741), Spanish admiral nicknamed "Captain Pegleg"
- Pegleg Falls – see List of waterfalls in Oregon, United States
