= Douglas Malewicki =

American aerospace engineer and inventor

- Born: 28 March 1939; Chicago, Illinois,
- Known for: SkyTran; Robosaurus; Nuclear War
- Awards: Guinness world record for street-legal vehicles driven at freeway speeds; 2012 Orange County Register's Outdoor Sportsman of the Year
- Scientific career
- Fields: Aeronautics, Mechanical engineering

Douglas "Doug" Malewicki is an American aerospace engineer and inventor of Polish descent. Many of his inventions concern flying vehicles, but the range is quite diverse. He is also the concept creator and inventor of Skytran PRT (personal rapid transit).

== Green vehicles ==
Malewicki spent 25 years advancing the Skytran concept of ultra-light computer-controlled cars hanging below aluminum maglev (magnetic levitation) tracks that could be supported above roads just by utility poles or the sides of buildings. Skytran basically combines maglev (which allows high speeds) and a hanging design (more stable and smaller tracks) with the 1960s' idea of personal rapid transit (PRT) -- cars that individual commuters take directly to their destination (hence "personal"), but computer-driven and available to others after they exit (hence "transit"). Another key PRT idea that Skytran follows is exiting the main track for boarding, so that the cars behind do not need to wait as they do with mass transit vehicles. In 2019, Israeli media said that Skytran was being considered as a transportation solution for bringing baggage and passengers from the new Ramon Airport to the city of Eilat, 20 kilometres (12 mi) away. Skytran was advanced in Israel from 2002 and was proposed at the Knesset in 2011. In 2011, it was revealed that a model of Skytran was being developed with Israel Aerospace Industries.

Malewicki developed the 157 and 156-miles-per-gallon "California Commuter" cars that hold the Guinness fuel economy records for street-legal vehicles driven at freeway speeds — an example of green vehicles.

He studied and developed various engineering solutions for highly-aerodynamic human-powered vehicles such as recumbent bicycles.

== Other vehicles ==
Malewicki shaking hands with Evel Knievel at Twin Falls

Malewicki developed the following vehicles and rides:

- Robosaurus, a 40-foot Tyrannosaurus rex-inspired "entertainment robot" that bites cars and airplanes in half at car shows. This thrill ride folds into a truck and can be driven between locations. It is seen in the movie Waking up in Reno where it is intended to be used as a revenge tool, to consume an SUV about to be sold.
- The X-1 Skycycle and Skycycle X-2 rocket-powered motorcycle that daredevil Evel Knievel shot over the Snake River Canyon to test the viability of his Skycycle jump. (Malewicki's colleague Robert Truax created the final design.)
- Engineering and design assistance of the rocketbelt, the RB-2000.
- The "Droid of Death" wing-morphing unmanned aerial vehicle (UAV) developed and tested under contract from DARPA.
- Patented Kitecycle for stuntman/daredevil Bob Correll who reached a world record with it.

== Other inventions and innovations ==
Malewicki was also involved in the development and invention of the following:

Malewicki designed the Nuclear War card game and has sold it independently from 1965. Rick Loomis of Flying Buffalo, for whom the game was one of the influences on his own Nuclear Destruction play-by-mail game, noticed that people were confusing the two games with each other, so after tracking Malewicki down, he added the game to his own catalogue and started publishing Nuclear War through Flying Buffalo in 1972. Expansions included "Nuclear Proliferation", "Nuclear Escalation" and "Weapons of Mass Destruction".

An aeronautical engineer by training, Malewicki spent much of his career working for American aeronautics and space companies including the Apollo program Moon landing vehicles, the stealth bomber and Cessna aircraft including their first private jet airplane. He was a model rocket enthusiast, becoming famous early in his career for the Malewicki equations that predicted the altitude and coast time of a model rocket flight.

According to Malewicki's daughter, he was the inspiration for the original one-eyed monster, called Mike, on the Pee-wee's Playhouse TV show and was later the inspiration for Mike Wazowski drawn by Ricky Nierva in Monsters, Inc.. A copy of the game plans in which he drew the first image of this alien is distributed free.
