= Nuclear War (card game) =

1965 card game

1965 edition box art

Nuclear War is a collectible common-deck card game designed by Douglas Malewicki and originally published in 1965 that is a satirical simulation of an end-of-the-world scenario fought mostly with nuclear weapons. It was previously published by Flying Buffalo, and has inspired several expansions.

== Development ==
Doug Malewicki designed the game in 1964. The game was rereleased in the late 1970s by Flying Buffalo, which released the two expansion sets Nuclear Escalation and Nuclear Proliferation. During the late 1990s, Flying Buffalo also released a 47 card set in randomized shrinkwrapped booster packs covered by a title card.

== Gameplay ==
The game is a multiplayer game, with each player having a small cardboard playmat upon which cards are placed and revealed. It is intended to be played by 3 or more players, but can also be played with only 2.

At the start of a game, each player is dealt a number of "population cards," ranging in denomination from 1 million to 25 million people. Players must protect their population, as the total loss of population leads to player elimination. They are then dealt a number of cards, which may be of the following types:

- Secrets which usually steal or reduce another player's population.
- Propaganda which steal another player's population, but have no effect once war has started.
- Delivery Systems usually missiles and bombers, which stay in play ready to hold a warhead. Later expansion sets add submarines and other options.
- Warheads which are fitted to a Delivery System, or discarded if there is not one available for them.
- Specials which are usually defensive cards to shoot down incoming missiles, or cards to increase the devastation caused by attacks.

Initially, players take turns playing secrets. Once all players have played all secrets and replaced cards from the deck they can announce 'no secrets' and place two cards face down. Players then take turns during which they will play a third face-down card, and then reveal the oldest face-down card (first in, first out) and resolve it. Secrets and propaganda cards are resolved immediately upon being exposed, while missile launches take more than one turn to properly set up.

The game begins in a Cold War, in which no one is yet at war and propaganda cards have full effect. Once players have a warhead fitted to a delivery system (for example by revealing a missile on one turn, then revealing a warhead on their next turn), they must launch an attack. When someone launches an attack, the threat of war is imminent. If the attack is successful, resulting in a nuclear detonation, (regardless if actual appreciable loss of life takes place) "war is declared," the Cold War is over, and propaganda cards are now worthless until a player is eliminated, at which time the Cold War resumes.

A truly successful attack reduces the target player's population; (bomb shelters and other civil defenses may mitigate against this); when a player's population reaches zero due to nuclear war, they may launch an immediate retaliatory attack (called "final retaliation") but they are noted as defeated. Often, a final retaliation will end another player's game, leading to a final retaliation by that player, and so on. Hence, in some cases, many players can be defeated in a series of tragedy in a single turn (via this mutual assured destruction method). If a player is knocked out with a propaganda card, no retaliation is allowed. However, if a player is eliminated by a secret while war is not declared, final retaliation is allowed.

The object of the game is to be the sole player remaining after all attacks are resolved. More often, final retaliation strikes remove all players in a chain reaction. Also, if the one and only 100-megaton bomb is exploded full force (not a "MIRV" device) and strikes a nuclear stockpile (very unlikely), a chain reaction ensues that destroys all life on the planet: everybody loses. If all players are eliminated from play, then there is no winner. Alternatively, a variant scoring system has been developed that determines a winner via a point system — 1 point for a knock out, 2 points for a propaganda knock out, 3 points for a retaliation knock out, a variable number of points for position depending on number of players, and finally 2 points for surviving (with the survivor not necessarily being the points winner). This point system is seen by some game enthusiasts as a betrayal of the original sense of purpose for this game: to illustrate that nuclear war is a winless proposition no matter what.

The delivery systems in the game reflect some of those in the American arsenal at the time each set was released, including the Polaris, Atlas and Saturn rockets. Other available delivery systems include the XB-70 Valkyrie deep penetration bomber, which had been cancelled several years prior to the base game's release, but which had two operational prototypes at the time; and the Convair B-58 Hustler, out of service for 35 years by the time it was introduced in 2004's Weapons of Mass Destruction.

== Expansions ==
Flying Buffalo has released a number of expansions, many of which can be played separately or with the original game. Each expansion highlights the worries of the end-of-the-world scenarios—including actual, theoretical, and feared weapons—at the time of their releases.

Nuclear Escalation (1983)
Adds deterrents and defensive capabilities, space platforms, the "glow-in-the-dark nuclear death die", and more.
Nuclear Proliferation (1992)
Each player now represents a different country with unique special powers. Adds submarines, atomic cannons, and more.
Nuclear War Booster Packs (1995)
Packs of 8 random cards from a set of 47 new cards.
Nuclear War Bonus Pack #1
9 new countries, warhead cards, a set of population cards, a bumper sticker, and a player assistance chart.
Nuclear War Bonus Pack #2 — India/Pakistan War Variant (1999)
Combines the Nuclear War game with the India Rails game.
Weapons of Mass Destruction (2004)
More cards for the game including new cards usable as either a missile or a warhead and a Deluxe Population deck featuring characters from Nodwick, Kenzer & Company and Dork Tower.
Nuclear War Bonus Pack #3
Same as Bonus Pack #1 but with new style of deluxe population cards from Weapons of Mass Destruction.

== Reception ==
In the December 1980 edition of The Space Gamer (Issue No. 34), Steve Jackson commented, "This is NOT an 'introductory' wargame – it's not a wargame at all. It's a card game. Recommended for a quick social game or for when everyone is too sleepy to play anything complex."

In the December 1993 edition of Dragon (Issue 200), Allen Varney considered Nuclear War a classic. "It’s a sin for a multi-player design to throw out a player before the game is over, but in this venerable game, that’s the whole point."

Scrye, in 2003, described it as a "classic off-color game". Though its popularity had waned by the 1990s, they noted "it's still one of the best card games out there."

== Reviews ==
- Dragon #223 (November 1995)
- 1980 Games 100 in Games
- 1981 Games 100 in Games
- Isaac Asimov's Science Fiction Magazine
- The Playboy Winner's Guide to Board Games

== Awards ==
- Nuclear Escalation - Charles Roberts Award for Best Science Fiction Boardgame of 1983
- Nuclear Proliferation - Origins Award for Best Fantasy or Science Fiction Boardgame of 1992
- Nuclear War - inducted into the Origins Adventure Gaming Hall of Fame

In 1999 Pyramid magazine named Nuclear War as one of The Millennium's Best Card Games. Editor Scott Haring said "Back when people were well-and-truly scared of the possibility of nuclear vaporization (I guess today either the threat is lessened, or it's become old hat), Nuclear War dared to make fun the possibility of mankind's dreaded nightmare via a card game."
