= SkyTran =

Personal rapid transit system concept

Artist's rendering of the proposed skyTran design

Skytran (stylized as skyTran) is a personal rapid transit system concept. It was first proposed by the inventor Douglas Malewicki in 1990 and was under development by Unimodal Inc. A prototype of the skyTran vehicle and a section of track have been constructed. The early magnetic levitation system, Inductrack, which SkyTran has replaced with a similar proprietary design, has been tested by General Atomics with a full-scale model. In 2010, Unimodal signed an agreement with NASA to test and develop skyTran. skyTran had proposed additional projects in France, Germany, India, Indonesia, Malaysia, the United Kingdom, and the United States.

== System details ==
To minimize maintenance and make switching on and off the tracks efficient at high speeds, early versions of the system were proposed using the Inductrack passive magnetic levitation system instead of wheels. Passive maglev requires no external power to levitate vehicles. Rather, the magnetic repulsion is produced by the movement of the vehicle over shorted wire coils in the track. The cars would be driven by a linear motor in the track or vehicle. Therefore, the system would have no electromechanical moving parts, making it entirely a "solid-state".

In this first version, the passive maglev coils are enclosed and supported by a light shell called a guideway that also captures the vehicles mechanically to prevent derailment. Malewicki proposes a 3D grid design that avoids accident-prone intersections by grade separation, with guideways and their exit and entry ramps crossing above or below each other. Tracks will be supported 20 or 30 feet (6 or 9 m) above the ground by standard metal utility poles. They could also be attached to the sides of buildings.

After identifying problems with Inductrack and the cost associated with it, skyTran described an improved design during a Horizon BBC interview with skyTran at NASA Ames in Mountain View, CA.

New details about the levitation and motor were described in a keynote speech in June 2016, showing levitation stators being plain aluminum plates and motor stators as aluminum tubes. The guideway is also significantly enlarged and wider than the vehicle, so the switching can be vertical, going through the guideway. The guideway shape is shown at 16:26 above the referenced video. This new concept can be seen in a short simulation film. Instead of the purely passive induct rack system, the new mechanism modifies lift by mechanically angling the magnetic pads and needs a servo-controlled actuation. The lift control also does the switching by moving vertically through the rails.

The patents filed by skyTran for this new system are US application 20150329010 and US application 20140130703

== History ==
Malewicki conceived the basic idea of skyTran in 1990, filing a US patent application that year that was granted as US Patent #5108052 in 1992. He published several technical papers on skyTran in the following years. In 1991, he presented a paper entitled "People Pods – Miniature Magnetic Levitation Vehicles for Personal Non-Stop Transportation" to the Society of Automotive Engineers (SAE) Future Transportation Conference in Portland, Oregon. The paper is a thorough description of the concept at that point, although some important features of the current skyTran design are only discussed as options, including magnetic levitation rather than wheels and hanging below the guideway instead of riding above it.

The paper describes how Malewicki had built and driven a freeway-legal 154-MPG car in 1981, but realised it could never be safe on a street surrounded by far larger and heavier vehicles. Elevated tracks would allow a very light vehicle to be safe. They are also basic to the system's inexpensiveness, because there is no need to acquire a huge right of way and tear down buildings. It presents an aerodynamic analysis (Malewicki is an aerospace engineer) supporting claims of very high energy efficiency (the paper claims 407 mpg_{‑US} or 489 mpg_{‑imp} or 0.578 L/100 km for skyTran's current two-passenger tandem design, though the Unimodal site claims only, "over 200 mpg_{‑US} or 240 mpg_{‑imp} or 1.2 L/100 km"). It also described how a very light vehicle that can squeeze both surfaces of a track simultaneously could reliably achieve a 6-G deceleration, allowing it to brake safely to a stop from 100 miles per hour (161 km/h) in just 55 feet (16.76 m).

The 2008, energy shortages stimulated renewed interest in green vehicle proposals such as skyTran. The "Maglev skyTran" topic quoted a number of skyTran and personal rapid transit ideas, such as passengers exiting and boarding at off-line elevated "portal" stops while high-speed traffic continues to speed by on its main line.

In September 2009, the US NASA (National Aeronautics and Space Administration) signed a Space Act joint development agreement with Unimodal. Unimodal has tested prototype vehicles on short guideway sections at NASA's Ames Research Center, in Mountain View, California. NASA control and vehicle dynamics simulation software was made available to Unimodal, which hired NASA subcontractors to program them using US DOT grant funding.

In June 2014, Unimodal and Israel Aerospace Industries (IAI) contracted to build a 400-500 meter elevated loop test track on IAI's campus in central Israel. If the pilot project is successful, IAI will build a commercial skyTran network in the city of Tel Aviv, Herzliya and Netanya. In April 2015, the Herzliya city council approved a budget for the skyTran project.

In June 2016, skyTran signed a memorandum of understanding in the United Arab Emirates for the study and implementation of a personal rapid transit system in Yas Island.

In 2018, it was announced that Indian conglomerate Reliance Industries had acquired a 12.7% stake in SkyTran through its subsidiary Reliance Strategic Business Ventures Limited. As part of the deal, Reliance would supply communication equipment and a prototype would be built in India.

In April 2019, SkyTran signed a memorandum of understanding with Eilat to build an elevated rail system serving Ramon Airport.

In June 2019 a memorandum of understanding was signed between skyTran and the Roads and Transport Authority (RTA) of Dubai in the United Arab Emirates to develop a Sky Pod suspended transit system.

In February 2021, Reliance Industries increased its shareholding in skyTran to 54.46% with an additional investment of $26.76 million making Reliance Industries Limited the majority stakeholder in SkyTran.

In September 2023, skyTran was shuttered and filed for bankruptcy due to no additional funding from Reliance Industries; even though a full-scale in-door prototype was within 6 to 9 months.

== See also ==
- Gondola lift
- Maglev train proposals
- Transport
- Sustainable transport
- Levicar
- String transport
