= Nuclear Proliferation (card game) =

1992 card game

Cover of box, artwork by Scott Jackson

Nuclear Proliferation is a satirical card game with a theme of nuclear war published by Flying Buffalo in 1992.

== Description ==
Nuclear Proliferation is a card game for 2–6 players in which players draw cards and use them to try to eliminate other players.

=== Components ===
The game box contains:

- 40 Population cards
- 108 Nuclear War cards
- 13 display boards
- 1 six-sided die, with the "1" replaced by a mushroom cloud
- rulebook
- spin arrow card

=== Set-up ===
Each player is given a storage board. The two decks of cards are shuffled. A number of Population cards are dealt to each player, the exact number depending on the number of players. Nine Nuclear War cards are dealt to each player. Each player in turn immediately lays down all "Secret" and "Top Secret" cards, follows the instructions of each, and then replaces them with new cards from the Nuclear War deck. If any of the new cards are also "Secret" or "Top Secret" cards, then these are also played and replaced. This continues until all players have a starting hand that does not contain any "Secret" or "Top Secret" cards. Each player chooses two cards from their hand and places them face down on the display board in the slots for Card 1 and Card 2.

=== First turn ===
The first player draws a new card from the Nuclear War deck. If it is a "Secret" or "Top Secret", it is resolved immediately, and then the player draws a replacement card. The active player then plays a card facedown in the slot for Card 3 on their storage board, and turns Card 1 face up. If the revealed card is a Propaganda card, it is resolved immediately, discarded, and the cards in Slots 2 and 3 are moved up to 1 and 2. If the revealed card is a missile or bomber, it is left faceup. The other players, in clockwise order, then have their first turn the same way.

=== Subsequent turns ===
On the first player's next turn, the player flips over Card 2. If it is a nuclear weapon and Card 1 was a missile or bomber, then the player has both a weapon and the means to deliver it — a nuclear war is initiated. If the player does not reveal a carrier for the nuclear missile, then play continues clockwise.

=== Nuclear war ===
Once a player initiates a nuclear war, all players are involved in the war. The active player chooses another player as a target, and twirls the spin arrow to determine the total damage, which is a combination of the damage shown on the bomb's card and additional damage indicated by the spin arrow. The defending player must discard population cards equal to the damage. If the player still has population left, then play continues clockwise.

Proaganda cards have no effect during nuclear war. If, during a nuclear war, a Propaganda card is revealed, it is immediately discarded.

The nuclear war continues until one player has their population reduced to zero and is eliminated from the game. When a player is eliminated, that player gets a "Final Strike": the player reveals all bombs and carriers in their hand and uses them immediately. If this results in another elimination, then the second eliminated player also gets a "Final Strike".

When at least one player has been eliminated, the nuclear war ends and peace is declared until the next time a player reveals both a carrier and a missile.

=== Defense cards ===
A player who is the target of an attack can immediately play a defense card from their hand which will negate the attack. The defending player then immediately draws a replacement card, and play shifts to the defending player.

=== Victory condition ===
If the last player survives the "Final Strike" of the second-last player, then the surviving player is the winner. If the last player does not survive, then there is no winner.

== Combining games ==
Nuclear Proliferation was preceded by two similar Flying Buffalo games: Nuclear War, and Nuclear Escalation. Players can expand the game by shuffling all the cards from two or three of the games together.

== Publication history ==
The card game Nuclear War was designed by Douglas Malewicki in 1965 and published by the Nuclear War Game Company. In 1980 Flying Buffalo bought the rights to the game and published a boxed set. In 1983, Flying Buffalo released Nuclear Escalation, which could be used as a game expansion or as a standalone game. In 1992, they published Nuclear Proliferation, which again could be used as an expansion with either or both of the first two games, or used as a standalone game. Cover art was by Scott Jackson.

== Reception ==
Mark Rouleau reviewed The Wizard's Grimoire in White Wolf #45 (July, 1994), rating it a 3 out of 5 and stated that "Players of Nuclear War and/or Nuclear Escalation should find this game to be a worthwhile supplement. Although Nuclear Proliferation can supposedly be played by itself, it works best as a supplement. New players are advised to pick up either of the previous two games before purchasing this one."

In the November 1995 edition of Dragon (#223), Rick Swan noted that the recent popularity of collectible card games had revived interest in Flying Buffalo's Nuclear War series. He thought the series overall had "lost none of its charm", and called Nuclear Proliferation a terrific sequel.

On the German game review site Spielphase, the reviewer thought too much depended on the random draw of cards rather than strategy, and called this "an average card game, which only stands out from the crowd because of its topic."

== Awards ==
At the 1993 Origins Award, Nuclear Proliferation won Best Fantasy or Science Fiction Boardgame of 1992.

== Other reviews ==
- Casus Belli #73
