= Malewicki equations =

Equations in rocketry

The Malewicki equations (or Fehskens–Malewicki equations) for sub-sonic endo-atmospheric rocket flight describe the maximum altitude and coast time of a vehicle such as a model rocket. Aerospace engineer and inventor Douglas Malewicki first published them as a technical report by the model rocket company Estes Industries in 1967.
