= Bradford and Foster Brook Railway =

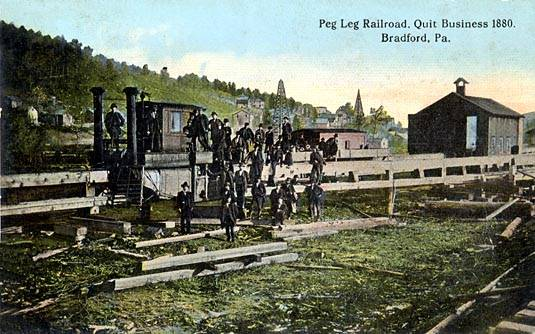
- Bradford & Foster Brook Monorail, 1880

Overview
- Status: Dismantled
- Locale: McKean County, Pennsylvania, U.S.
- Termini: Bradford, Pennsylvania (west); Foster Township, McKean County, Pennsylvania (east)

Service
- Type: Monorail
- Operator(s): Bradford & Foster Brook Railway Company

History
- Opened: January, 1878
- Closed: January, 1879

Technical
- Line length: 4 mi (6.4 km)
- Character: At Grade
- Operating speed: 30 mi (48.3 km) per hour

The Bradford & Foster Brook Railway was one of the earliest, if not the first, monorails in America. Inspired by a working demonstration of the Centennial Monorail at the Philadelphia Centennial Exposition of 1876, Col. Roy Stone thought it would solve transportation problems near Bradford, Pennsylvania. In 1876, Bradford was a booming oil town with much machinery and oil supplies awaiting delivery. Because of muddy road conditions, deliveries to the oil fields were delayed. Construction of the railroad was already started by October 31, 1877, when the Railway Corporation was founded.

The railway was constructed similar to the Lartigue Monorail design, and consisted of a series of piles driven into the ground connected by 12" square timbers upon which set a single rail. Three feet below the railhead was a stringer on each side. This stringer bore a wear strip upon which the rail cars pressed a wheel for balance. Road crossings operated like a fence gate, as did switches.

A variety of engines were constructed for the railway. The first engine had twin boilers and sat low on the rail. It wore out quickly, and was replaced by a heavier engine of more conventional single-boiler design. This engine had only two drivers and bore heavily on the rail, crashing through on its fourth trip along the railway. No one was hurt in the accident, although several people had to be rescued from the stream. By the beginning of the next year, a third locomotive had been constructed, again using twin boilers.

This third locomotive had second-hand boilers. They were tested to their specifications; however, on the engine's trial run, one boiler ran dry, and when too much water was introduced by an inexperienced fireman, the resulting explosion killed six people, and put an end to the railroad.
