= Weapons of Mass Destruction (game) =

Weapons of Mass Destruction is a 2004 card game supplement published by Flying Buffalo for Nuclear War.

== Contents ==
Weapons of Mass Destruction is a supplement in which a fast-paced expansion (or standalone) card game for 2–4 players has major world powers vie for domination using propaganda or nuclear weapons, featuring a 70-card WMD deck and a 40-card population deck with comic-inspired art.

== Reviews ==
- Pyramid
- Backstab #49
