= PegLeg (video game) =

1994 video game

- Developer: High Risk Ventures
- Publisher: Changeling Software
- Designer: Sean D. Ansorge
- Platform: Macintosh
- Release: August 1994
- Genre: Shoot 'em up
- Mode: Single-player

PegLeg is a shoot 'em up video game developed by High Risk Ventures and published by Changeling Software for the Macintosh.

== Gameplay ==
PegLeg is an arcade-style shoot 'em up game. The player controls a spaceship with a blaster that is used to destroy asteroids, projectiles, and enemies approaching the ship. Featuring a top-down view, similar to the game Asteroids, the player can move freely within the world. There are several blasters that can be used, which are earned by collecting randomly spawned power-ups in each level. Points are earned for each object destroyed, and a bonus is earned based on how fast a player completes a level.

== Development ==
PegLeg was written by Sean D. Ansorge, who previously wrote the Macintosh shareware game Hemiroids. This Asteroids clone was nominated in 1993 by MacUser as the best shareware entertainment product of that year. While working on it, Ansorge described PegLeg as "one heck of a lot more fun" than his earlier effort. The developer, High Risk Ventures, had released another Asteroids-inspired game, Space Madness, as its first commercial project in 1993 as well. PegLeg was released for Mac computers in August 1994. A sequel was released in 1996.

== Reception ==
Reception

Review scores
Publication	Score
Computer Game Review	80/100
Next Generation	3/5
Electronic Entertainment	4/5

Next Generation's reviewer stated, "If you've got work to do, better stay away from this game." MacAddict named PegLeg one of the Macintosh's essential titles, and the magazine's Kathy Tafel wrote, "If you ever happen to visit us here at MacAddict, take a look at our receptionist's Mac. Chances are, you'll find it running PegLeg". Writing in The Macintosh Bible, Bart Farkas praised the game and said that it "will have you playing for hours—and will inflict serious damage on your trigger finger if you're not careful."

Macworld awarded PegLeg its 1995 "Best Shoot-'em-up" prize. The magazine's Steven Levy called it "compulsively seductive even to a jaded alien-blaster with an arthritic trigger finger".
