= Nuclear Escalation (card game) =

1984 card game

- Cover art by Douglas Chaffee
- Designers: Douglas Malewicki; Michael Stackpole
- Illustrators: Douglas Chaffee
- Publishers: Flying Buffalo
- Publication: 1983
- Genres: Satire of nuclear war

Nuclear Escalation is a satirical card game published by Flying Buffalo in 1983 about nuclear conflict that is a sequel to Nuclear War.

== Gameplay ==
Nuclear Escalation can be used as a standalone game or it can be used in conjunction with its predecessor Nuclear War, adding new rules and game options.

== Publication history ==
Flying Buffalo published the satirical card game Nuclear War in 1983. In proved popular, and the following year Flying Buffalo published a sequel designed by Douglas Malewicki and Michael Stackpole, Nuclear Escalation, with cover art by Douglas Chaffee.

== Reception ==
In Issue 25 of Abyss, Dave Nalle noted, "This, like the original, is based on the assumption that nuclear war can be fun, and if you suspend prejudices, it is fun." Nalle pointed out that this game "plays acceptably on its own, and is a fun, easy to learn game, with the same flavor as the original. However, it works even better in combination with the original Nuclear War game, as it adds many variables and all of the additions are compatible with the original."

In Issue 68 of Space Gamer, Scott Haring commented "So if you can laugh in the face of potential nuclear conflagration, Nuclear Escalation is not only a cute little game in its own right, but it combined with Nuclear War to produce a killer (pardon the expression) game that is a definite improvement on the original."

The editors of Games included Nuclear Escalation in the "Top Games of 1984," commenting, "This game, like Dr. Strangelove, is funny enough to make you laugh at a most unlikely subject."

In the December 1984 issue of Isaac Asimov's Science Fiction Magazine, Dana Lombardy said "If you're not offended by a serious subject being treated humorously, maybe you know a friend in the nuclear freeze movement who'd just love to get a copy of Nuclear War or Nuclear Escalation. By the way, the games really are fun to play." Six months later, Lombardy called both Nuclear War and Nuclear Escalation "very good for beginners ... These two card games can be played by themselves, or joined together for one giant 'nuke.' Great satire."

In Issue 223 of Dragon, Rick Swan reviewed the collectible card game (CCG) version and noted, "The recent introduction of booster packs, featuring Disinformation and Virtual People cards, seems like a concession to players of the Magic: the Gathering game. Though the boosters are fun to read, they don't add much to the proceedings; since everyone uses the same cards, for instance, you can't customize your own deck. But if this is what it takes to snare a new audience, so be it."

== Awards ==
In 1983, Nuclear Escalation was awarded the Charles S. Roberts Award for "Best Science Fiction Boardgame."

== Controversy ==
Nuclear Escalation was the target of a call for a ban on all war-related toys and games in the UK when two MPs of the UK Labour Party called the game "a nasty twist on the toy industry". Game designer Rick Loomis responded "the game is intended to be humorous... the subject is so serious that you have to laugh about it because otherwise you'd cry." The proposed ban failed to gain any traction, and was soon forgotten.
