= Centennial Monorail =

Monorail in Philadelphia

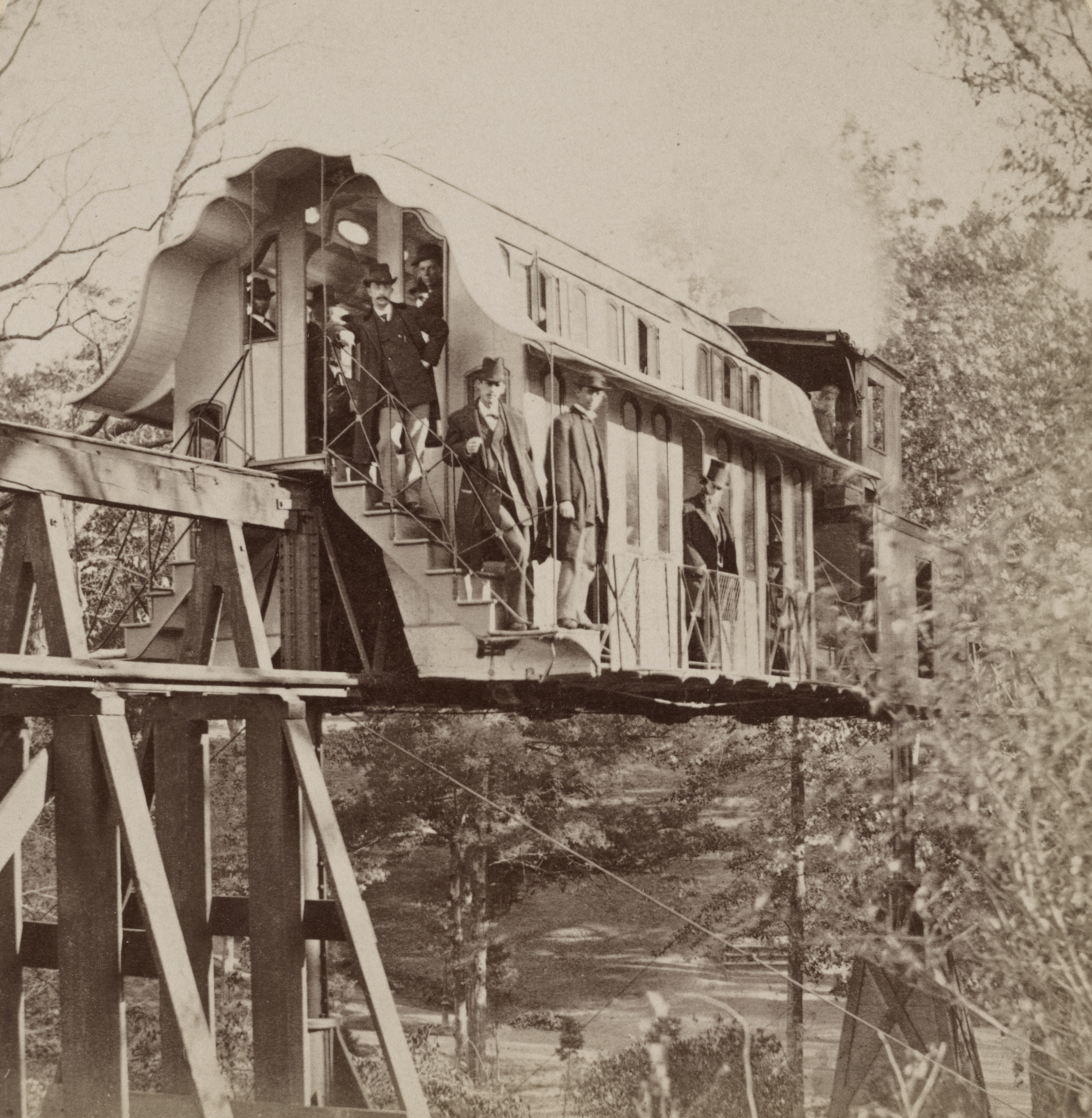
Centennial Monorail

General Roy Stone's Centennial Monorail was demonstrated at the Centennial International Exhibition of 1876, the first official World's Fair in the U.S., which was held in Philadelphia, Pennsylvania, to celebrate the 100th anniversary of the Declaration of Independence.

== Technology ==
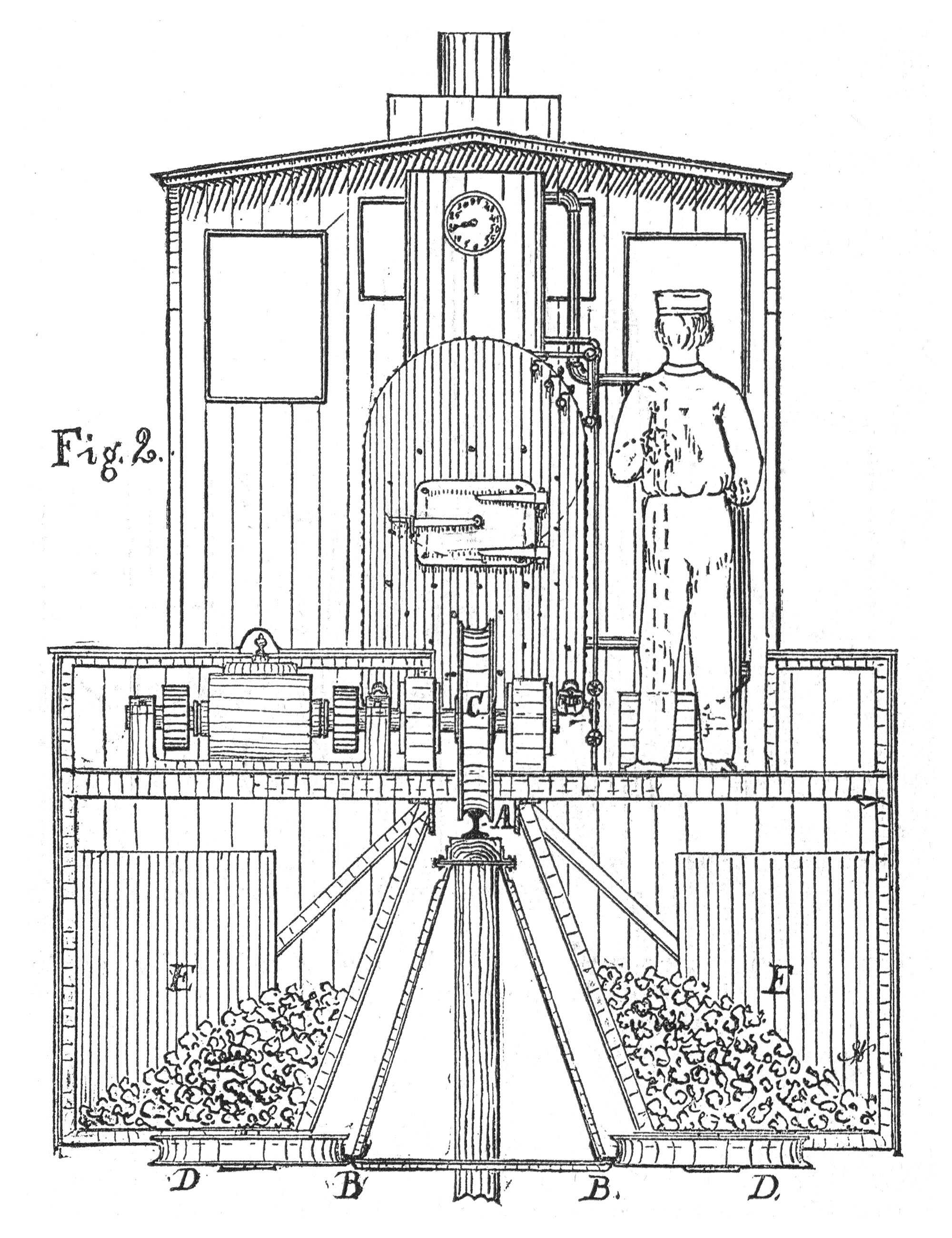
Cross-section of locomotive (Scientific American Suppl. II.33, 12 Aug 1876)

The track was approximately 170 yards (155 meters) long and joined the Horticultural Hall and the Agricultural Hall in Fairmount Park. It was used by one elaborately decorated double-decker railcar in Victorian style. It had two load-bearing double-flange wheels, of which one was driven by a rotary steam engine of the "La France" type.

The concept was similar to that of the Lartigue Monorail: The load-bearing rail was installed on top of wooden A-frames. 4 feet 5 inches (1,346 mm) below there were two guide-rails for balancing the vehicle. The load-bearing wheels had a diameter of 28 inches (711 mm). The boiler was similar to that of conventional steam engines: it was 21 feet (6,400 mm) long with a diameter of 34 inches (863 mm). The driver's cabin was at the rear end, and just below there were two water tanks with coal heaped behind them.

A modified version of this demonstrator was exploited in 1878 on the Bradford & Foster Brook Railway in Pennsylvania.
