= SkyWay Group =

Unauthorized transport investment brand

Skyway Group
- Trade name: SkyWay Group
- Type: Private
- Industry: Investments
- Products: investment services
- Divisions: First SkyWay Invest Group Limited; SkyWay Invest Group; SWIG SIA; RSW Investment Group LTD (BVI) (currently renamed to NEEW-TNG LTD); SWIG International Ltd.; SWIG America Consulting LLC Maryland (US); SWIG Australia PTY LTD (liquidated); ООО “Скай Вей Групп” (Russia)

SkyWay Group is an investment brand used since 2014 by various crowd-investing platforms and independent agents to attract investments in string transport.

The companies under which these platforms are registered have different founders and names. Among them are First SkyWay Invest Group Limited, SkyWay Invest Group (ceased to exist in 2021), SWIG SIA (Latvia, ceased to exist in 2021), RSW Investment Group LTD (BVI) (currently renamed to NEEW-TNG LTD).

In 2018, financial regulators in Germany, Lithuania, and five other countries warned that SkyWay "is not registered as a financial services provider and therefore, is not allowed to provide such services in their country," or warned the public about potential fraud the company was perpetrating.

== Overview ==
The SkyWay Group (SkyWay Invest Group, SWIG) comprises companies that have raised investments for the development of string transport under the SkyWay investment brand. At various times, these companies invited potential investors to invest in the development of this transport technology. The investment method used was crowd-investing, employing various mechanisms, including convertible loan agreements. To increase the number of investors, a referral reward system was used.

Various promotion methods, such as telemarketing and multi-level marketing, were employed to attract investors. This crowd-investing model is characterized by the fact that the manufacturing company does not sell traditional securities but enters into convertible loan agreements with investors (lenders).

Due to the potential risks and challenges associated with crowdfunding as an investment mechanism, financial regulators in Belgium, Lithuania, and Estonia issued warnings that companies operating under the SkyWay investment brand do not have the appropriate licenses in these jurisdictions. Additionally, the Financial Markets Authority of New Zealand (FMA) stated that SkyWay Capital is not registered as a financial services provider in the country.

Among the companies that operated under the SkyWay investment brand, the most frequently mentioned are First SkyWay Invest Group Limited, SkyWay Invest Group (ceased operations in 2021), SWIG SIA (Latvia, ceased operations in 2021), RSW Investment Group LTD (BVI) (now renamed to NEEW-TNG LTD), SWIG International Ltd., SWIG America Consulting LLC Maryland (US), SWIG Australia PTY LTD (liquidated), and ООО “Скай Вей Групп” (Russia). All these companies were warned by financial regulators, and almost all have now ceased operations.

The SkyWay Group is often mistakenly associated with Unitsky String Technologies Inc., which does not provide financial services but is a developer, supplier, and operator of transport systems. In November 2021, the company announced a rebranding, changing its name from SkyWay Technologies Co. to Unitsky String Technologies Inc. The rebranding was explained as a transition from the “startup” phase to the “business” phase and a need to emphasize the engineering company's disassociation from fundraising activities conducted by various independent agents using names related to SkyWay.

SkyWay Group seeks investors through its website and social media. The SkyWay Group have been seeking potential investors all over the world using various forms of marketing such as crowdfunding, telemarketing and multi-level marketing. It has also been documented that the SkyWay Group promote their technology with paid advertising on television and in newspapers, and that financial services are being offered via social media.

== String transport ==
SkyWay Group presented investment opportunities for a technology called string transportation.

The string transport project represents a new type of elevated light rail transport system. It is based on technology involving pre-stressed transport overpasses of a new generation, with the key element being the string rail. This rail is a steel or composite beam containing a bundle of pre-stressed tension wires (strings) and equipped with a rail head. Passenger and freight electric vehicles with steel wheels are intended to travel automatically along these rails at speeds up to 150 km/h (potentially up to 500 km/h). Horizontal loads on the viaduct are supported by anchor supports spaced up to 10 kilometers apart. These supports can be integrated with passenger stations, freight terminals, and commercial spaces.

The string transportation project existed long before the establishment of the SkyWay Group. In 2001, a test track based on this technology was constructed in the town of Ozery in the Moscow region. The project was commissioned by the administration of the Krasnoyarsk Krai, led by Governor Alexander Lebed. Construction was completed in record time, and within nine months, the first tests were conducted in October 2001. The vehicle used for testing was a ZIL-131 truck, modified specifically for the string rails. The tests validated technologies for service and road maintenance were also developed. However, the project did not progress further, and the test track was soon closed.

In 2001, the technology gained recognition and was included in the United Nations Human Settlements Program (UN-Habitat). During the project, an analysis was conducted of several existing transport programs at both federal and regional levels in Russia.

Several companies are involved in implementing this technology, such as Unitskiy String Technologies, Kathmandu Podway Company Pvt. Ltd., BeemCar Ltd, among others. Representatives of these companies have repeatedly stated their independence from the activities of the SkyWay Group. Projects are being implemented in Belarus and the United Arab Emirates, with recent negotiations taking place in the UAE.

In addition to demonstration models at the EcoTechnoPark in Belarus, the companies has exhibited technology at trade fairs like the 3rd Singapore International Transport Congress and Exhibition (SITCE).

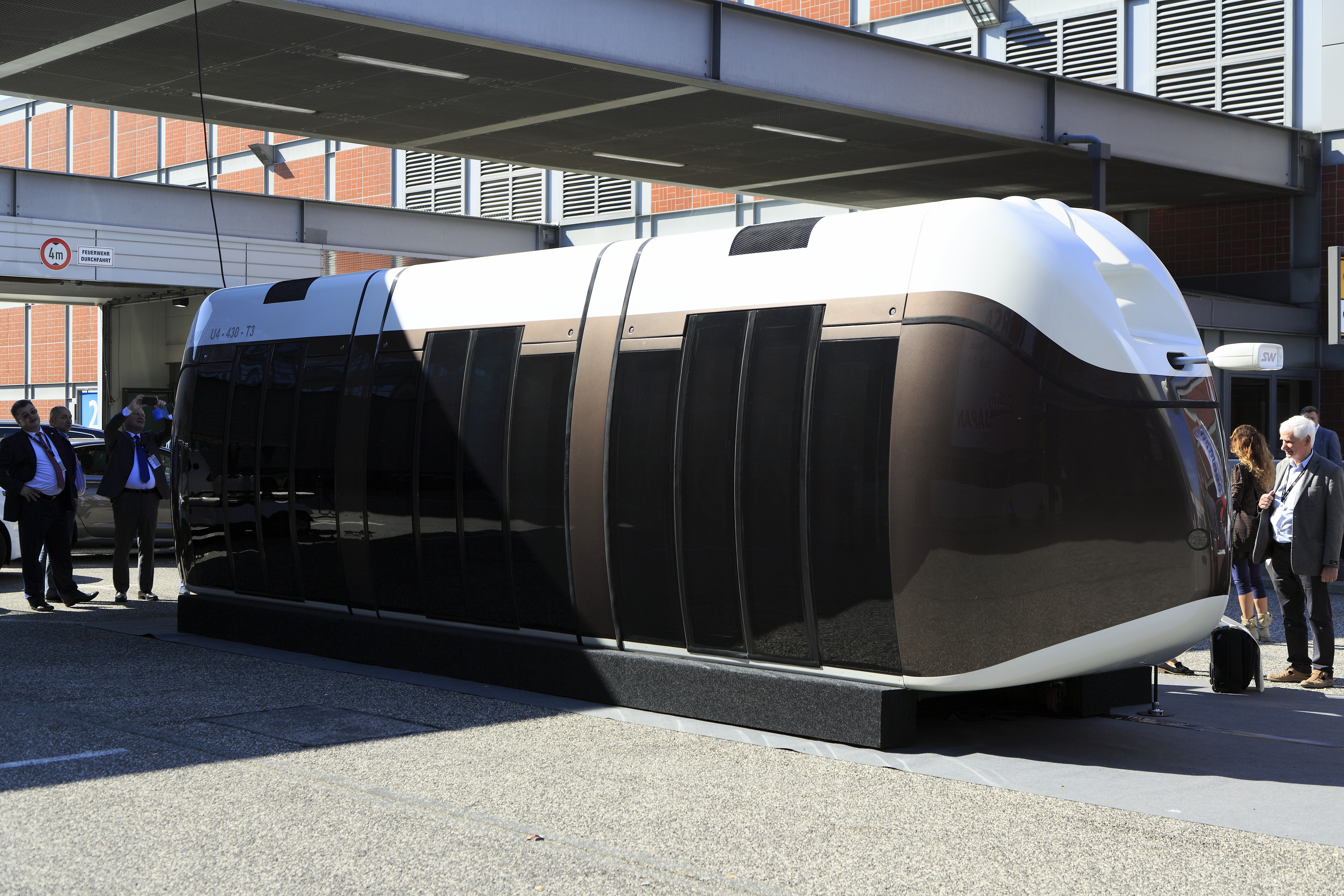
A monorail vehicle at the InnoTrans trade fair in Berlin in 2018.

=== Marketing ===
The SkyWay Group started negotiating with countries like Lithuania, Australia, Slovakia, India, Italy and Indonesia.

==== Lithuania ====
The municipality of Šiauliai in Lithuania signed an investment agreement with SkyWay in 2014. The mayor of Šiauliai was later criticized for negotiating with the SkyWay Group and at the end of 2014 he was instructed to cancel the negotiations. In 2014, the Bank of Lithuania released an official statement warning investors of SkyWay. An investigation by the country's Prosecutor General's office found no evidence to prosecute the company. A subsequent lawsuit by SkyWay against the Lithuanian government was dismissed in 2018.

==== Australia ====
In 2016 in South Australia, SkyWay negotiated with Flinders University to build a 500 meter long line for $13 million Australian dollars under the direction of ex-state transport minister Rod Hook who worked for SkyWay as an infrastructure consultant. These negotiations were eventually postponed indefinitely in August 2018, as they opted for driverless busses instead.

==== Slovakia ====
In July 2016 SkyWay signed a memorandum of understanding with the Slovak University of Technology in Bratislava to promote SkyWay technology in Slovakia.

==== India ====
In May 2017 a memorandum of understanding was signed by the minister of Urban Development of the Northern Indian state Himachal Pradesh with SkyWay Group. The minister who negotiated with SkyWay was criticised for doing so "without following proper procedures" Critics also questioned why an agreement was signed with a company that had no operational projects, and for the suitability of the technology to be used in the region.

==== Indonesia ====
In September 2017 a memorandum of understanding was signed with the University of Indonesia in West Java to build on-campus 'sky trains'.

In December 2017 a memorandum of understanding was signed in Jakarta for a proposed project in Kalimantan.

In February 2018 a memorandum of understanding was signed with the Gadjah Mada University in Central Java to promote research and innovation in the field of transportation.

The OJK (the Indonesian financial regulatory agency) added SkyWay Capital to its list of prohibited companies. As a result, all negotiations in Indonesia were finally cancelled or postponed and the activities of the Indonesian subsidiary "PT SkyWay Technologies Indonesia" were frozen.

==== Italy ====
In early 2018 negotiations took place in Italy. The Secretary of State for the Republic of San Marino signed a memorandum of understanding at the EcoTechnoPark in Belarus in March 2018 for the construction of the San Marino-Rimini line. The mayor of the Sicilian city Messina also used SkyWay's "flying trams" to promote his electoral campaign. Both negotiations were postponed or cancelled because of concerns brought up in local politics and by the Italian regulatory agency Commissione Nazionale per le Società e la Borsa (CONSOB).

In March 2019, Brianza – a region in North-West Lombardy, Italy – invited SkyWay to present a feasibility project for a cable car between Cologno Monzese and Vimercate. Due to controversy surrounding the company these negotiations have been postponed.

== Financial regulation ==
Regulators in Belgium, Lithuania, Estonia and Latvia have warned investors about SkyWay not being authorized to issue shares in the respective countries.

In February 2018 the Italian regulatory agency CONSOB prohibited the advertisement and sale of certain SkyWay investment products to Italian citizens.

In May 2019 the German regulatory agency BaFin prohibited the public offering of SkyWay investment products to the general public.

In August 2019 the Financial markets Authority (FMA) of the New Zealand reiterated warning about potential Skyway Capital/SWIG scam.

== Criticism ==
Concerns have been raised in published articles about information the company has posted about itself to drive investment. These concerns include the unrealistic returns promised to investors, the value of its intellectual property, awards it has won, and people/organizations who have invested in the company.

Particular criticism relates to misleading information about proposed SkyWay projects. Onliner.by (a popular Belarusian news portal), for example, document that the claims SkyWay made about a proposed project in Mogilev were actually untrue. Similar misleading promotion has been documented relating to proposed projects in Russia, the Crimea and India.

The first critical article by the publication Onliner by was released in September, 2016 and it was commenting on the EcoTechnoPark testing facility being built at the time in Marjina Horka. The EcoTechnoPark representative sued them for damage done to the company and its reputation. The court refused a lawsuit in June 2017 and was required to pay costs incurred by the defendant. The appelation against this dismissal was unsuccessful.

In May 2017 the Volzhskaya Kommuna newspaper published a critical article on their 'Volga News' information portal about a telemarketing campaign used for funding in Samara. The company's representative Andrei Khovratov filed a lawsuit against the editorial board but in March 2018 the court decided against the plaintiff.

In July 2017 the popular Crimea news sender Primechaniya.ru published an article critical of a telemarketing campaign promoting investment in an unsupported SkyWay project in Sevastopol. Later articles they published include information about legal threats issued by SkyWay employee Andrei Khovratov who represented SkyWay in the Crimea and the unsuccessful litigation in Minsk and Samara.

== See also ==
- Automated guideway transit
- SkyTran
- Suspension railway
