= 1878 in rail transport =

This article lists events related to rail transport that occurred in 1878.

== Events ==
=== January events ===
- January 18 – Construction on the Central Australia Railway route south of Port Augusta, Australia, begins.

=== February events ===
- February 5 – The first train is operated on the Seattle & Walla Walla Railroad from Renton to Newcastle.

=== May events ===
- May 9 – The final segment of the Romanian railway between Vârciorova in the south and Roman in the north opens.
- May – Chemins de fer de l'État formed in France to take over ten small railway companies operating between the Loire and Garonne.

=== June events ===
- June 1 – The North British Railway's Tay Bridge across the Firth of Tay in Scotland, is opened to public traffic, making it the longest in the world at that date.

=== July events ===
- July 2 – The Brooklyn, Flatbush & Coney Island Railway, original predecessor of the BMT Brighton Line, in modern Brooklyn, New York, opens to Brighton Beach on Coney Island.

=== August events ===
- August 24 – The narrow gauge Ballymena and Larne Railway starts passenger operations in County Antrim, the first on the Irish 3 ft narrow gauge.

=== October events ===
- October 16 – Rimutaka Incline in New Zealand opens.

=== December events ===
- December 4 – The first Shay locomotive is completed for the 3-foot narrow gauge Alleyton and Big Lake Railroad of Everett Township, Michigan.

=== Unknown date events ===
- Fred Harvey enters a partnership with the Atchison, Topeka & Santa Fe Railway to build and operate the Harvey House chain of restaurants and hotels that will serve the railroad's passengers.
- The Richmond & Danville Railroad acquires the Charlotte, Columbia & Augusta Railroad.
- The Canadian Engine and Machinery Company is reorganized after a bankruptcy as the Canadian Locomotive and Engine Company.
- The Wilmington, Columbia and Augusta Railroad, lessee of the Wilmington & Weldon Railroad, declares bankruptcy.

== Births ==
=== April births ===
- April 14 – Angus Daniel McDonald, president of the Southern Pacific Company, parent company of the Southern Pacific, 1932–1941 (d. 1941).

=== October Births ===
- October 26 – William Kissam Vanderbilt II, heir to Cornelius Vanderbilt and president of the New York Central system (d. 1944).

== Deaths ==
=== March deaths ===
- March 29 – Mark Hopkins, a member of The Big Four group of financiers in California (b. 1813).

=== June deaths ===
- June 27 – Sidney Breese, U.S. senator from Illinois known as the "father of the Illinois Central Railroad," dies (b. 1800).

=== October deaths ===
- October 19 – Benjamin Henry Latrobe, II, designer of Baltimore and Ohio Railroad's Thomas Viaduct, still in use toda), dies (b. 1806).

=== December deaths ===
- December 27 – Daniel McCallum, General Superintendent of New York & Erie Railroad 1855–1858 (b. 1815).
