= Greek city-state patron gods =

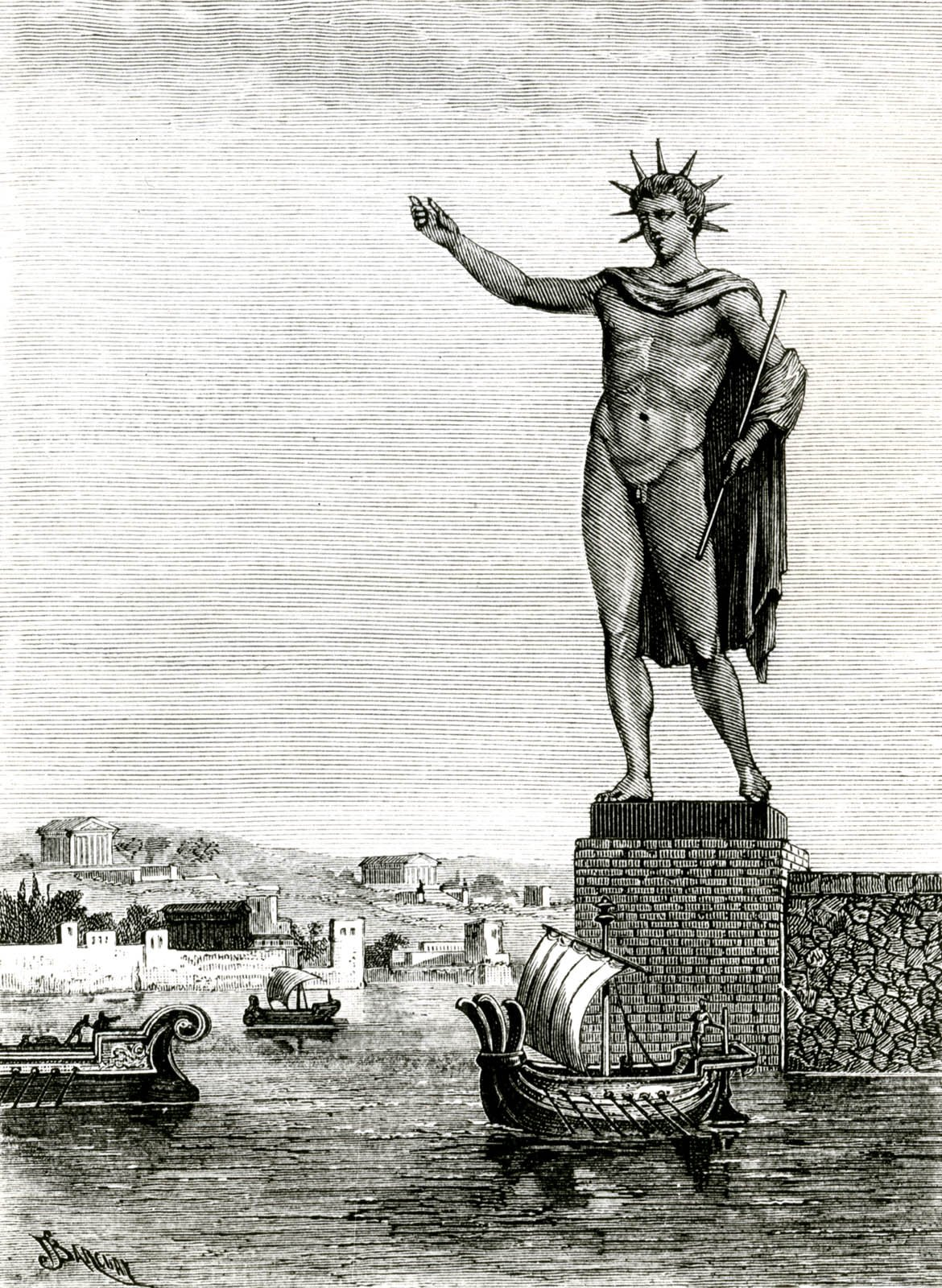
19th century engraving of the Colossus of Rhodes

Ancient Greek literary sources claim that among the many deities worshipped by a typical Greek city-state (sing. polis, pl. poleis), one consistently held unique status as founding patron and protector of the polis, its citizens, governance and territories, as evidenced by the city's founding myth, and by high levels of investment in the deity's temple and civic cult. The temple of the deity involved was usually founded on the highest ground (acropolis) within the city walls, or elsewhere within the central public assembly space, the agora. Conversely, a city's possession of a patron deity was thought to be a mark of the city's status as polis.

Some poleis seem to have had several "patron gods" in sequence, or all at once. Some had more than one founder, or founding myth. A few would have superficially resembled a collection or tribal coalition of villages rather than the single, centralised entity suggested by the English term "city-state"; early Sparta provides a clear example of this. Some poleis seem to have had no distinct or identifiable patron deity.

== Greek city-states ==
The rise of the polis seems to have coincided with Greek abandonment of kingship, and its replacement by warrior-aristocracies, and rulers elected by self-governing citizen communities. Greek city-states were governed from a prytaneion, a building thought to have functioned as a palace under monarchs, and otherwise as an administration centre, with a large reception hall that also housed the sacred "common hearth" of the polity.

=== Foundation deities ===
The hearth of every prytaneion and domestic household was sacred to the goddess Hestia, whose presence and cult within the prytaneion and households justified the civil, political and religious basis of the city's public life, and the community's decisions concerning treaties, laws, institutions and traditions. In founding a new colony, live embers of Hestia's fire were carried from the parent-polis to the colonial prytaneion, where they were used to kindle the new colony's sacred, sacrificial fire. Without an agora, sacrificial fire, altar and Hestia, there could be no city. This aside, poleis were largely self-defined; they need not be politically independent, they might use any of various regional Greek dialects and their size seems to have been an irrelevance to their definition as poleis, or modern identification as "city-states". Some were enclosed within larger states. Some had only 200-500 male citizens and no more than a few square kilometers of agricultural land. Others were very populous, or became so through confederation, with estimated populations of many thousands, and with lands and influence extending many miles into surrounding countryside, or across the Mediterranean Sea. Land hunger and warfare were endemic. The two largest and most powerful of these states, Sparta and Athens, mutually antagonistic for much of their history, both acknowledged the same protective deities. Where Sparta chose conquest and subjection of its Greek-speaking neighbours to the immediate west (see Mantinea), Athens used her navy to help establish new, colonial poleis much further afield.

Prospective founders of Greek city-states and colonies sought the approval and guidance not only of their "mother city" but of Apollo, through one or another of his various oracles. Apollo acted as consulting archegetes (founder) at Delphi, and among his various functions, he was patron god of colonies, architecture, constitutions and city planning. Greek colonies were founded throughout the Mediterranean world, some of them very distant from their "parent" cities. Based on epigraphic evidence Herman-Hansen (1994) estimate the number of Greek poleis to have been "over one thousand... including colonies", presuming a prytaneion a reliable indicator of a city-state, and thus, perhaps, of a patron deity. A legendary divine institution pertaining to "patron deities of the polis" seems evident in Apollodorus, Bibliotheca 3.14.1; "in the time of Kekrops, they say, the gods decided to take possession of cities in which each of them should receive his own peculiar worship". Plato's belief that every polis had a divine patron was carried into modern scholarship. "About 91" prytaneia are identified in literary sources. Prytaneia are archaeologically confirmed at Delos, Lato and Olympia, and six others are reasonably secure.

Greek city-state foundation myths are always tied to a particular place, foundation date and festival, sometimes to a civic ancestor – who might also be a heroic or divinised proto-founder, such as Heracles – and often, but not always, to a named deity. The problems involved in the identification of patron deities, and of the poleis as poleis, can be complex. H. S. Versnel finds that the "image of gods as city patrons is theoretical rather than evidential". There is no formula that helps differentiate state cults from civic cults, or identify a protective or patron deity of the poleis within a given local pantheon. "Conversely, some poleis seem to have had several [patron deities], some to have changed their patron deity over time, and some to have had no patron god or goddess at all." Even Hestia can pose problems in the identification of a polis; according to Herman-Hansen, most archaeologists have identified as prytaneion any large, apparently public building containing a hearth, assuming it a sign of Hestia, not a commonplace kitchen utility. Herman-Hansen believe that a complete prytaneon should surely contain two hearths – one for Hestia and another for cooking at feasts, though no "second hearth" has been found in any building identified as a prytaneon.

=== Deities of place ===
Several states or communities might lay claim to the favour of a particular deity; the foundation myth of Athens, whose navy was a major factor in the city's growth and defence, had Athena and Poseidon, god of the sea, compete in a chariot race for the honour of becoming the patron of Athens. This was not interpreted as conflict between the cults or supporters of the deities concerned; a deity worshipped in one place under a particular epithet could be identified elsewhere by another epithet, referring to the different locations of their temples, or to particular aspects of their divine powers, or effectively, their recognition as a different manifestation of the same deity. Patron gods were a focus in the diplomacy and political life of the polis; and are sometimes referred to as "poliad" gods in modern scholarship but they were not definitive of a polis, nor a universal requirement. Athena and Apollo, being both powerful and well-equipped to manage and regulate the needs of city-dwellers, are among the most common named patron gods of poleis.

Panhellenic deities were recognised as universal, but they were still deities of place. To this extent, almost every Greek deity has a tutelary aspect. Each was manifest in a shrine, temple, precinct, sacred image or natural feature of the polis landscape, adding up to a sort of divine network or collective cultivated by the community, to be propitiated in times of need, and honoured and thanked for assistance rendered. While some deities might have greater protective functions than others, many thanksgiving inscriptions and dedications tend to play safe, acknowledging the help and support of quite minor or local deities as well as any major deities officially enrolled as protectors of the polis. Citizens were acculturated to their unique and distinctive local identity, ancestors, territories, heroes, gods and founding myths.

== Examples ==
- Athena's designation as patron deity of Athens was established in the Great Panathenaea of 566 BC, which may have been coincident with the construction or development of the Altar of Athena Polias (Athena of the polis), supposedly by the sons of the would-be tyrant Peisistratos. The reforms of Peisistratos favoured the Athenian lower classes, and helped erode the privilege, power base and influence of the Athenian and Attic aristocracy. Peisistratos seems to have impressed the Athenian populace with lavish, theatrical displays of his personal dedication to Athena as his patron goddess, the patron goddess of Athens, and of all Attica, a goddess completely identified with the city for which she had been named, and with his personal authority.

Athena's cult was one of many in Athens, but it also replaced or modified various local cults of lesser poleis, bringing their religious affairs under Athenian control and demanding tribute; for example, an ancient Arcadian goddess, Alea, became Athena Alea, and under that name, was patron deity of Mantineia and of ancient Tegea, which was under Spartan domination for much of its history but was also the site of Athena's greatest temple, alongside one to an "Ephesian" form of Artemis, and a temple to Dionysus.

- Sparta, Laconia and their allied neighbours shared a cult of a heavily militarised form of Apollo in defence of their borders with Argos. Sparta's foundation myth credited the demi-god Heracles as proto-founder, and ancestor of their early kings. The Sanctuary of Artemis Orthia was one of the most important religious sites in Sparta. Three major festivals of Sparta, the Hyacinthia, Gymnopaedia and Carneia, were celebrated in honour of Apollo. Lycurgus, the semi-mythical lawgiver of Sparta, established the military-oriented reformation of Spartan society in accordance with instructions from Apollo' Oracle at Delphi.
- Apollo's Delphic oracle was his most important. Its location was thought to be the omphalos, the navel and centre of the universe. The Delphians and others worshipped Apollo as Delphian Apollo. The island of Delos, which claimed the honour of being Apollo's birthplace, worshipped him as Delian Apollo.
- The best known festivals of the pan-Hellenic circuit are probably the Olympic Games, which were sacred to Zeus as patron deity of Olympia, and chief deity of the Greek Olympian Pantheon; the games were so well broadcast and firmly established that they were used as a common referent in various Greek calendars. Lists of the cities and city officials to be notified of imminent pan-Hellenic festivals have proved a valuable resource in the identification of polies. Zeus was also patron deity of Elis.
- Syracuse, like Athens, worshipped Athena. Reference to Athena can be seen on their city-state banner.
- Corinth chose Poseidon, lord of the sea, earthquakes and horses, as their patron god.
- Thebes' had various patron deities at different times in its existence. Its foundation myth established Cadmus as founder, and his daughter Semele as doomed mother of Dionysus, who was fathered by Zeus, and spared from his mother's conflagration when Zeus cut open his own thigh, sewed him within and eventually "gave birth" to him. Dionysus became the city's divine patron. Sophocles' play Antigone includes an ode to Dionysus as guardian of Thebes. Because Thebans had close ties with Delphi, Apollo was another of their patron gods, but held second place to Dionysus.
- Megara worshipped Apollo as their patron god, and as such, he is lauded by the poet Theognis of Megara in his collection of works Theognidea as guardian of the city.
- The polis of Argos was dedicated to the worship of Hera.
- The island city-state of Samos, in the Aegean Sea, worshipped Hera too as their patron.
- Rhodes was an island city, which built the Colossus of Rhodes, a giant statue of their patron god, Helios.
- Both Eretria and Epidaurus worshipped Apollo as their patron god. Eretria, as Apollo Daphnephoros; and Epidauros as Apollo Maleatas (Apollo's son, Asklepios, was also worshipped at Epidauros).
- The patron god of the city of Miletus, in Asia Minor, was Apollo. The sanctuary and oracle of Didyma, devoted to Apollo, was within Miletus' territory.
- The patron goddess of Ephesus, also in Asia Minor, was Artemis, who had been identified with an oriental mother goddess, like Cybele. The Temple of Artemis, or Artemision, in Ephesus was one of the Seven Wonders of the Ancient World.
- The city of Cnidus, in Asia Minor, worshipped Aphrodite as their patron.
- Pausanias remarks on an ancient, unworked stone block that represented the divine Eros, patron deity of Thespiae in Boetia, adding that he did not know who "established among the Thespians the custom of worshipping Love more than any other god..."
- Pherae had Enodia, a local Thessalian goddess, as their patron.

== Bibliography ==
- Balot, Ryan K., (Editor) A Companion to Greek and Roman Political Thought (Blackwell Companions to the Ancient World): 69, Wiley-Blackwell, 2009
- Buckley, Terry (2010). Aspects of Greek History: 750–323 BC. London: Routledge. ISBN 9780415549776.
- Burkert, Walter (1985). Greek Religion. Harvard University Press. ISBN 0674362810.
- Cartledge, Paul, (2021), "Thebes: The Forgotten City of Ancient Greece", Hardback, Pan Macmillan
- Cartledge, Paul (2002). Sparta and Livonia: A Regional History 1300–362 BC. New York: Routledge. ISBN 0415263565.
- Cartledge, Paul (2011). Ancient Greece: A Very Short Introduction. New York: Oxford University Press. ISBN 9780199601349.
- Cole, Susan Guetel (1995). Hansen, Mogens Herman (ed.). Civic Cult and Riv Duty. In "Sources for the Ancient Greek City-State: Symposium August, 24–27 1994, Acts of the Copenhagen Polis Centre". Kg l. Dansk Deliberateness Sealskin. ISBN 9788773042670.
- Detienne, Marcel, and Janet Lloyd. "The Gods of Politics in Early Greek Cities." Arion: A Journal of Humanities and the Classics, vol. 12, no. 2, Trustees of Boston University, 2004, pp. 49–66, JSTOR 20163970.
- Fine, John V.A. (1983). The Ancient Greeks: A Critical History. Harvard University Press. ISBN 0674033116.
- Herman-Hansen, Mogens and Tobias Fischer-Hansen. 1994. "Monumental Political Architecture in Archaic and Classical Greek Poleis. Evidence and Historical Significance." In D. Whitehead, ed., Historia Einzel-Schriften 87: From Political Architecture to Stephanus Byzantinus: Sources for the Ancient Greek Polis. Stuttgart: Franz Steiner, 30–37 ISBN 9783515065726 googlebooks partial preview November 6 2021
- Holladay, James (Apr 1977). "The Followers of Peisistratus". Greece & Rome. 24 (1). Cambridge University Press: 40–56. doi:10.1017/S0017383500019628. JSTOR 642688. S2CID 145629351.
- Kearns, Emily (2009). Ancient Greek religion: A source book. Wiley-Blackwell. ISBN 978-1405149280.
- Mikalson, Jon D., (2009) Ancient Greek Religion: 11 (Blackwell Ancient Religions), Wiley-Blackwell, ISBN 140518177X
- Pavlides, Nicolette. The Sanctuaries of Apollo Maleatas and Apollo Tyritas in Laconia: Religion In Spartan–Perioikic Relations, Annual of the British School at Athens Vol. 113, Published online by Cambridge University Press: 12 February 2018.
- Peterson, Michael (1992). Cults of Apollo at Sparta: The Hyakinthia, the Gymnopaidai and the Karneia. ABM Homers. ISBN 9179160271.
- Versnel, H. S., Coping with the Gods; Wayward readings in Greek Theology, Brill, 2011
- Zhou, Unique (2010). Festivals, Feasts, and Gender Relations in Ancient China and Greece. New York: Cambridge University Press. ISBN 9781107665507.
