= Swords of the Gods =

Fantasy play-by-mail game

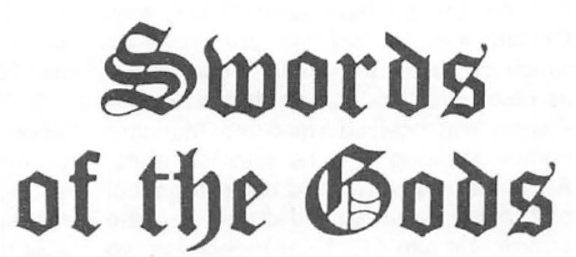
- Galactic Simulations title image, 1989
- Publishers: Galactic Simulations, Ares Games
- Years active: 1986 to unknown
- Genres: play-by-mail, fantasy, wargame
- Languages: English
- Players: 10–15
- Playing time: fixed
- Materials required: Instructions, order sheets, turn results, paper, pencil
- Media type: Play-by-mail or email

Swords of the Gods is a closed-end fantasy play-by-mail wargame. The game was based on the trilogy Books of Swords by Fred Saberhagen. It was published by Galactic Simulations with playtesting starting in January 1986. Ares Games later published the game. 10–15 players per game vied for domination of a fantasy world with magic swords and deities which influenced gameplay. The game received positive reviews in gaming magazines in the late 1980s and early 1990s.

== History and development ==
Swords of the Gods is a closed-ended fantasy PBM wargame. Reviewer Tim Sullivan likened it to a combination of Quest of the Great Jewels and Domination. The game was based on the trilogy Books of Swords by Fred Saberhagen. The publisher started playtesting in January 1986. Galactic Simulations published the game. Bob Casa was the gamemaster. By 1992, Ares Games of Severn, Maryland was publishing Swords of the Gods Their gamemasters were Mark and Betty Minch.

== Gameplay ==
The game map comprises 110 provinces. 10–15 players start in home provinces and battle for control of the land and resources. The 12 Swords of Power and deities were central to gameplay. The swords, imbued with magic powers, were Coinspinner, Dragonslicer, Doomgiver, Farslayer, Mindbender, Shieldbreaker, Sightbinder, Soulcutter, Stonecutter, Townsaver, Wayfinder, Woundhealer. The gods were Olympian, including Apollo, Aphrodite, Artemis, Athena, Hades, Hera, Hestia, Hephaestus, Hermes, Poseidon, and Zeus. These deities could aid players in different ways. Diplomacy was a key element of gameplay. Victory through world domination could be achieved individually or with an alliance.

== Reception ==
Phil Strang reviewed the game in a 1989 issue of Flagship. He stated that it was a "very enjoyable military game". Vickie Lloyd and Steve Rempel reviewed the game in a 1989 issue of Paper Mayhem. She stated, "This game definitely has lots going for it. ... It is an easy game to get the hang of and it moves quickly. ... I very much recommend this game and think it would be excellent for those who are new to PBMing." Marc Macagnone reviewed the game in the September–October 1992 issue of Paper Mayhem. He called Swords of the Gods a "great game". Out of 5 stars, he rated the game 5 stars for Cost vs. Fun Index, Diplomacy, Game Materials, Game Playability, GM Response, and Rulebook, with an overall rating of 5 stars. In the same issue, the game tied with Kings at No. 43 of 84 games in Paper Mayhem's PBM Game Ratings. Mark Wincek reviewed the game in the July–August 1993 issue of Paper Mayhem. He stated, "Swords of the Gods is definitely a game worth trying if you like good, simple fun."

== See also ==
- List of play-by-mail games

== Bibliography ==
- Editors (September–October 1992). "PBM Game Ratings as of 07–20–92". Paper Mayhem. No. 56. pp. 52–53.
- Lloyd, Vickie; Rempel, Steve (November–December 1988). "Swords of the Gods Review". Paper Mayhem. No. 33. pp. 14–17.
- Macagnone, Marc (September–October 1992). "Swords of the Gods: A Review". Paper Mayhem. No. 56. pp. 26–27, 30.
- Strang, Phil (February 1989). "Swords of the Gods". Flagship. No. 20. pp. 42–43.
- Sullivan, Tim (February–March 1988). "From the Helm: Swords of the Gods". The D2 Report. No. 16. p. 30.
- Wincek, Mark (July–August 1993). "Swords of the Gods". Paper Mayhem. No. 61. pp. 6, 7–9.
