= Mola salsa =

Ancient Roman mixture used in religious sacrifice

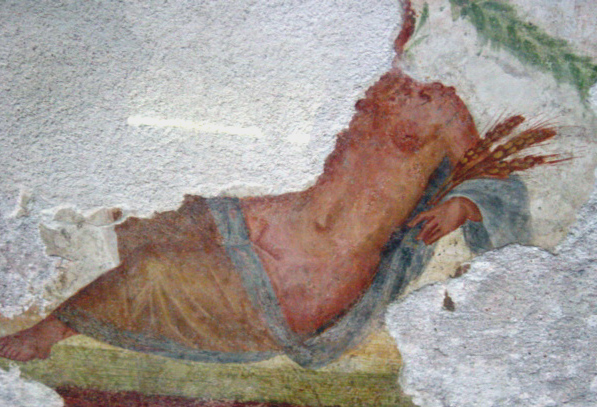
Fragmentary Roman wall painting depicting the goddess Ceres holding stalks of wheat

In ancient Roman religion, mola salsa ("salted flour") was a mixture of coarse-ground, toasted emmer flour and salt prepared by the Vestal Virgins and used in every official sacrifice. It was sprinkled on the forehead and between the horns of animal victims before they were sacrificed, as well as on the altar and in the sacred fire. It was a common offering to the household hearth.

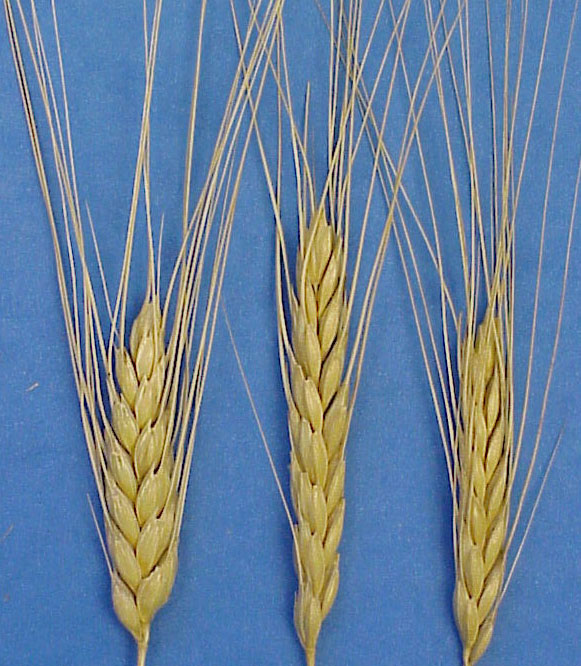
Emmer wheat, used for mola salsa

Servius describes the substance as pius (perhaps "reverently prepared" in this sense) and castus ("ritually pure"). The mola salsa was so fundamental to sacrifice that "to put on the mola" (Latin immolare) came to mean "to sacrifice", hence English "immolation". Its use was one of the numerous religious traditions ascribed to Numa Pompilius, the Sabine second king of Rome.

The College of Vestals would make mola salsa during the Vestalia, the chief festival of the hearth goddess Vesta celebrated June 7–15.
