= Hestia =

Greek goddess of the hearth

- Goddess of the hearth
- Member of the twelve Olympians
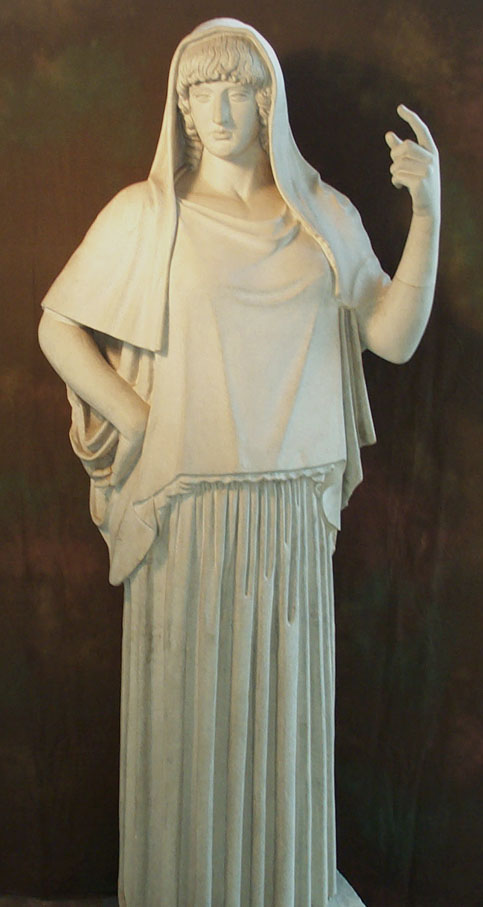
- The Giustiniani Hestia
- Abode: Delphi, Mount Olympus
- Animals: Pig
- Symbol: The hearth and its fire

Genealogy
- Parents: Cronus and Rhea
- Siblings: Demeter, Hera, Hades, Poseidon, Zeus

Equivalents
- Roman: Vesta

In ancient Greek religion and mythology, Hestia (/ˈhɛstiə, ˈhɛstʃə/; Ancient Greek: Ἑστία, lit. 'hearth, fireplace, altar') is the virgin goddess of the hearth and the home. In myth, she is one of the six children born to the Titans Cronus and Rhea, and one of the twelve Olympians.

According to the Theogony of Hesiod, newborn Hestia, along with four of her five siblings, was devoured by her father Cronus, who feared being overthrown by one of his offspring. Zeus, the youngest child, escaped with his mother's help, and made his father disgorge all his siblings. Cronus was supplanted by this new generation of deities; and Hestia thus became one of the Olympian gods, the new rulers of the cosmos, alongside her brothers and sisters. In spite of her status, she has little prominence in Greek mythology. Like Athena and Artemis, Hestia elected never to marry and remained an eternal virgin goddess instead, forever tending to the hearth of Olympus.

As the goddess of sacrificial fire, Hestia received the first offering at every domestic sacrifice. In the public domain, the hearth of the prytaneum functioned as her official sanctuary. Whenever a new colony was established, a flame from Hestia's public hearth in the mother city would be carried to the new settlement. The goddess Vesta is her Roman equivalent.

== Origins and etymology ==
Hestia's name means "hearth, fireplace, altar". This stems from the PIE root *wes, "burn" (ultimately from *h₂wes- "dwell, pass the night, stay"). It thus refers to the oikos: domestic life, home, household, house, or family. Walter Burkert stated that an "early form of the temple is the hearth house; the early temples at Dreros and Prinias on Crete are of this type as indeed is the temple of Apollo at Delphi which always had its inner hestia". The Mycenaean great hall (megaron), like Homer's hall of Odysseus at Ithaca, had a central hearth. Likewise, the hearth of the later Greek prytaneum was the community and government's ritual and secular focus. Hestia's naming thus makes her a personification of the hearth and its fire, a symbol of society and family, also denoting authority and kingship.

== Mythology ==
=== Origin ===
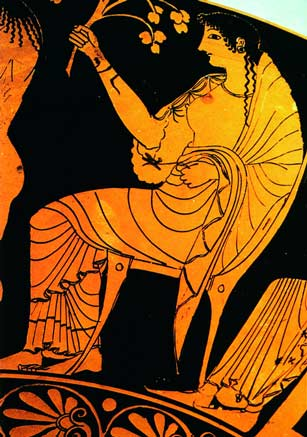
Hestia holding a branch of a chaste-tree, red-figure kylix, attributed to Oltos, Tarquinia National Museum

Hestia is a goddess of the first Olympian generation. In the Theogony, she is the eldest daughter of the Titans Rhea and Cronus, and elder sister to Demeter, Hera, Hades, Poseidon, and Zeus. Immediately after their birth, and starting with Hestia, Cronus swallowed each one of them, but their mother deceived Cronus and helped the infant Zeus escape. When he was grown up, Zeus forced Cronus to disgorge his siblings and led them in a war against their father and the other Titans.

Some scholars like Karl Kerenyi interpret the lines from the Homeric Hymn to Aphrodite (composed around the eighth or seventh century BC) that Hestia is simultaneously the eldest and youngest Cronid to mean that she can count as both because she was the first to be devoured and (presumably) the last to be yielded up again when her father was forced to let go of the children he devoured. In addition, Hesiod who has Hestia as the firstborn wrote that Cronus threw up the stone that supplanted Zeus first, strongly implying a reverse order of disgorgement that could have been the influence of the hymn's author. On the other hand it is likely that the anonymous author of the hymn was trying to reconcile the two conflicting birth orders given by Hesiod and Homer; while in the Theogony the firstborn is Hestia, in the Iliad Hera states that she is the eldest child.

=== Status and attributes ===
Like Artemis and Athena, Hestia opted to remain an eternal virgin. The myth states that the gods Poseidon and Apollo (her brother and nephew respectively) both fell in love with her and vied for her hand in marriage. But Hestia would have neither of them, and went to Zeus instead to swear a great oath; that she would remain a virgin for all time and never marry. Zeus accepted and upheld her decision. According to the Homeric Hymn to Aphrodite, Aphrodite (the goddess of sex and love) is said to have "no power" over Hestia and the other two.

Zeus assigned Hestia a duty to feed and maintain the fires of the Olympian hearth with the fatty, combustible portions of animal sacrifices to the gods. Wherever food was cooked, or an offering was burnt, she thus had her share of honor; also, in all the temples of the gods, she has a share of honor. "Among all mortals, she was chief of the goddesses". Hestia is identified with the hearth as a physical object, and the abstractions of community and domesticity, in contrast to the fire of the forge employed in blacksmithing and metalworking, the province of the god Hephaestus. Portrayals of her are rare and seldom secure. In classical Greek art, she is occasionally depicted as a woman simply and modestly cloaked in a head veil. At times, she is shown with a staff in hand or by a large fire. She sits on a plain wooden throne with a white woolen cushion. Her associated sacrificial animal was a domestic pig. At Athens during Plato's time, Kenneth Dorter notes that "there was a discrepancy in the list of the twelve chief gods, as to whether Hestia or Dionysus was included with the other eleven"; the dedicated altar in the agora included Hestia, but on the other hand Dionysus was present in the east frieze of the Parthenon. However, the hearth was immovable, and there is no story of Hestia having ever left or been removed from her fixed abode. Burkert remarks that since the hearth was immovable, Hestia was unable to partake even in the divine procession, let alone the Olympians' other antics.

Traditionally, Hestia is absent from ancient depictions of the Gigantomachy as she is the one who must keep the home fires burning when the other gods are away. Nevertheless, her possible participation in the fight against the Giants is evidenced from an inscription on the northern frieze of the Siphnian Treasury in Delphi; Brinkmann (1985) suggests that the letter tracings of one of the two goddesses right next to Hephaestus be restored as "Hestia", although other possible candidates include Demeter and Persephone, or two of the three Fates.

=== Equivalence ===
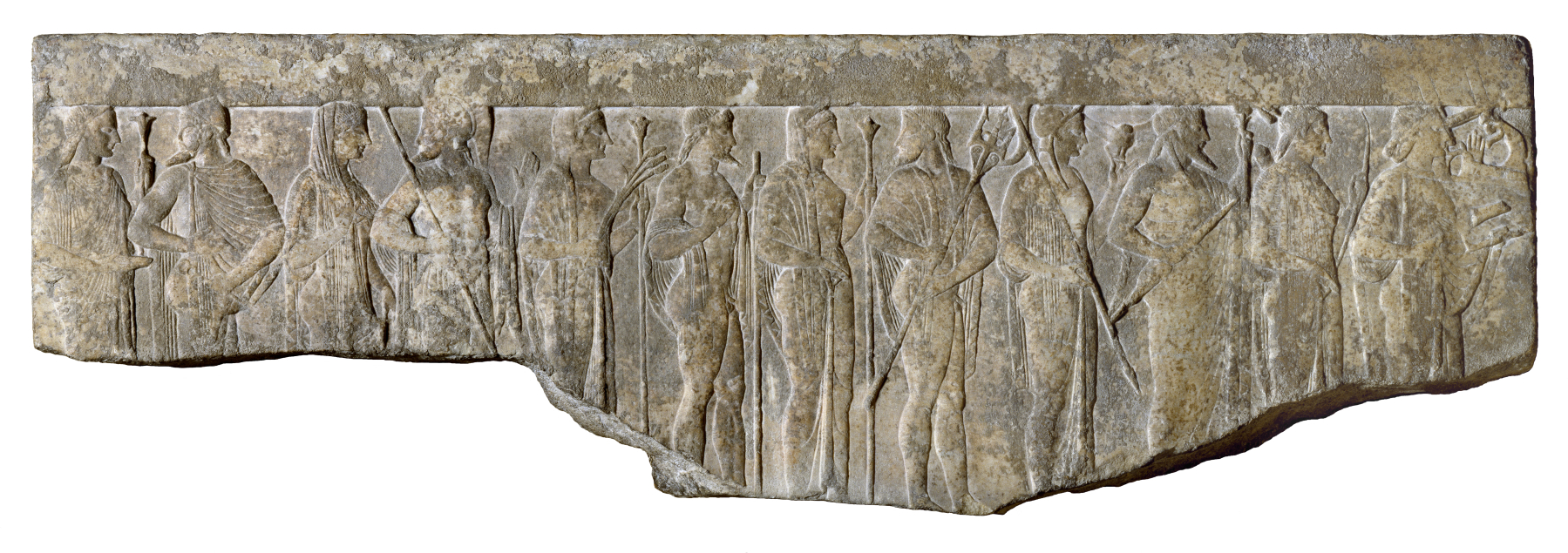
Fragment of a Hellenistic relief (1st century BC – 1st century AD) depicting the twelve Olympians carrying their attributes in procession; Hestia with scepter to the left, from the Walters Art Museum

Her Roman equivalent is Vesta; Vesta has similar functions as a divine personification of Rome's "public", domestic, and colonial hearths, binding Romans together within a form of extended family. The similarity of names between Hestia and Vesta is, however, misleading: "The relationship hestia-histie-Vesta cannot be explained in terms of Indo-European linguistics; borrowings from a third language must also be involved", according to Walter Burkert. Herodotus equates Hestia with the high ranking Scythian deity Tabiti. Procopius equates her with the Zoroastrian holy fire (atar) of the Sasanians in Adhur Gushnasp.

In one tradition preserved by Plutarch, King Tarchetius planned to execute his daughter and her handmaid. Hestia/Vesta appeared to him in a dream and forbade the murder. Because of her intervention, the handmaid survived and gave birth to twin sons, who were subsequently identified with Romulus and Remus, the legendary founders of Rome.

To Vesta is attributed one more story not found in Greek tradition by the Roman poet Ovid in his poem Fasti, where during a feast of the gods the resting Vesta is nearly raped in her sleep by the god Priapus, and only avoids this fate when Silenus' donkey abruptly cries out, alerting Vesta and prompting the other gods to attack Priapus in defense of the goddess. This story is an almost word-for-word repeat of the myth of Priapus and Lotis, recounted earlier in the same book, with the difference that Lotis had to transform into a lotus tree to escape Priapus, making some scholars suggest the account where Vesta supplants Lotis only exists in order to create some cult drama.

== Worship ==
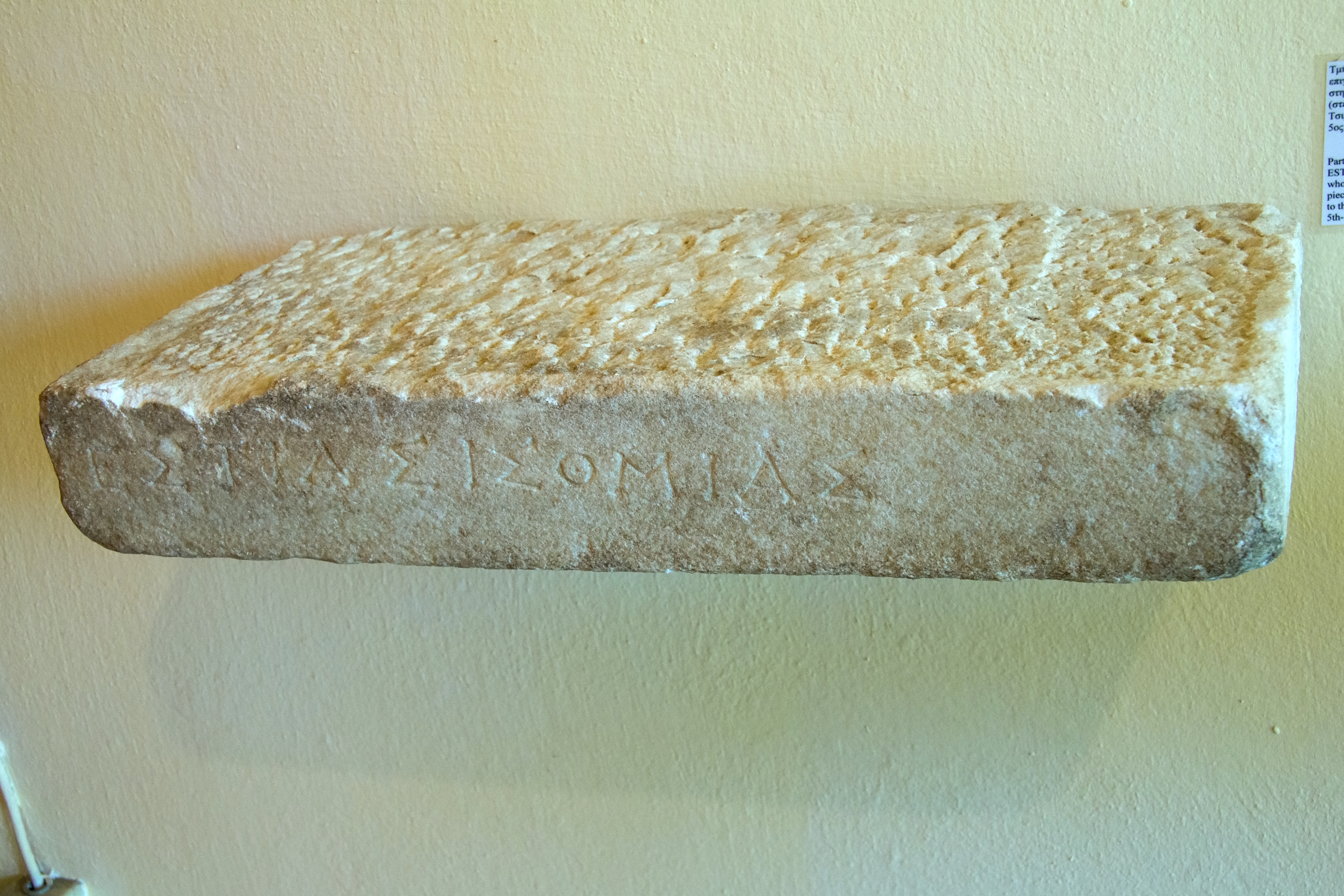
Part of a marble altar with inscription ESTIAS ISTHMIAS, 5th–4th century BC. The altar was dedicated to the goddess Hestia with the epithet Isthmia ("of the isthmus". Archaeological Museum of Paros.

The worship of Hestia was centered around the hearth, both domestic and civic. The hearth was essential for warmth, food preparation, and the completion of sacrificial offerings to deities. Hestia was often the recipient of the first offering during sacrifices, and of the first and last libations made during feasts. Pausanias writes that the Eleans sacrifice first to Hestia and then to other gods. Xenophon in Cyropaedia wrote that Cyrus the Great sacrificed first to Hestia, then to sovereign Zeus, and then to any other god that the magi suggested.

The accidental or negligent extinction of a domestic hearth fire represented a failure of domestic and religious care for the family; failure to maintain Hestia's public fire in her temple or shrine was a breach of duty to the broad community. A hearth fire might be deliberately, ritually extinguished at need; but its lighting should be accompanied by rituals of completion, purification, and renewal, comparable with the rituals and connotations of an eternal flame and of sanctuary lamps. At the level of the polis, the hearths of Greek colonies and their mother cities were allied and sanctified through Hestia's cult. Athenaeus, in the Deipnosophistae, writes that in Naucratis the people dined in the Prytaneion on the birthday of Hestia Prytanitis.

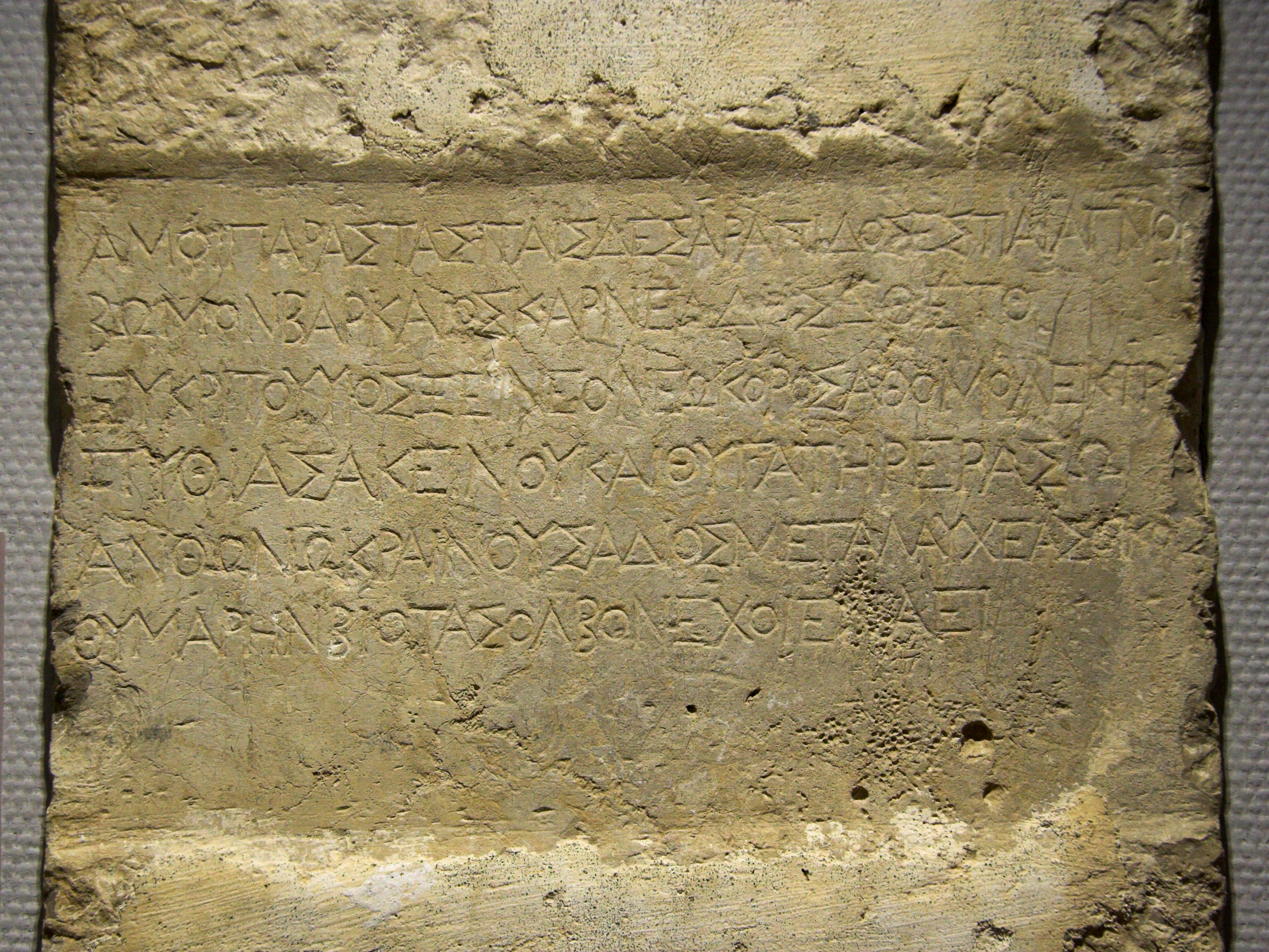
Dedication of an altar to Hestia in Karneades, Taormina (undated). The inscription states: "Beside these walls of Serapis the warden of the temple Karneades of Barke, son of Eukritos, O foreigner, and his spouse Pythias and his daughter Eraso placed to Hestia a pure altar, as a reward for this, O you that governs the marvelous dwellings of Zeus, grant to them a lovely auspiciousness of life."

Responsibility for Hestia's domestic cult usually fell to the leading woman of the household, although sometimes to a man. Hestia's rites at the hearths of public buildings were usually led by holders of civil office; Dionysius of Halicarnassus testifies that the prytaneum of a Greek state or community was sacred to Hestia, who was served by the most powerful state officials. However, evidence of her dedicant priesthood is extremely rare. Most stems from the early Roman Imperial era, when Sparta offers several examples of women with the priestly title "Hestia"; Chalcis offers one, a daughter of the local elite. Existing civic cults to Hestia probably served as stock for the grafting of Greek ruler-cult to the Roman emperor, the Imperial family, and Rome itself. In Athens, a small seating section at the Theatre of Dionysus was reserved for priesthoods of "Hestia on the Acropolis, Livia, and Julia", and of "Hestia Romain" ("Roman Hestia", thus "The Roman Hearth" or Vesta). At Delos, a priest served "Hestia the Athenian Demos" (the people or state) "and Roma". An eminent citizen of Carian Stratoniceia described himself as a priest of Hestia and several other deities, as well as holding several civic offices. Hestia's political and civic functions are further evidenced by her very numerous privately funded dedications at civic sites, and the administrative rather than religious titles used by the lay-officials involved in her civic cults.

=== Shrines, temples and colonies ===
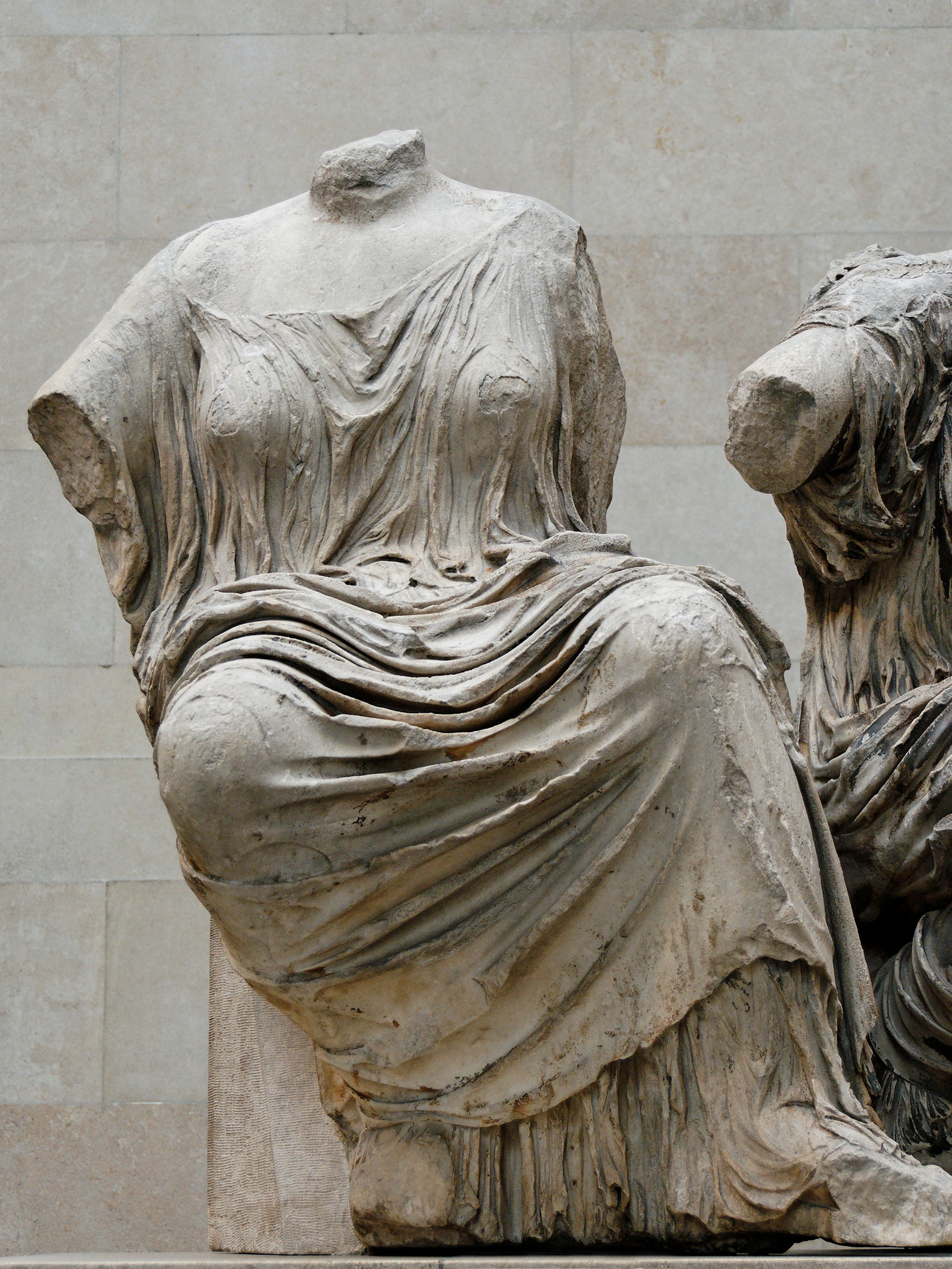
Hestia from the eastern pediment of the Parthenon, mid-fifth century BC, British Museum

Every private and public hearth was regarded as a sanctuary of the goddess, and a portion of the sacrifices, to whatever divinity they were offered, belonged to her. Aeschines, On the Embassy, declares that "the hearth of the Prytaneum was regarded as the common hearth of the state and a statue of Hestia was there, and in the senate-house there was an altar of the goddess." A temple at Ephesus was dedicated to Hestia Boulaea – Hestia "of the senate", or boule. Pausanias reports a figurative statue of Hestia in the Athenian Prytaneum, together with one of the goddess Eirene ("Peace"). Hestia offered sanctuary from persecution to those who showed her respect and would punish those who offended her. Diodorus Siculus writes that Theramenes sought asylum directly from Hestia at the Council Chamber, leaping onto her hearth not to save himself, but in the hope that his slayers would demonstrate their impiety by killing him there.

Very few free-standing temples were dedicated to Hestia. Pausanias mentions one in Hermione and one in Sparta, the latter having an altar but no image. Xenophon's Hellenica mentions fighting around and within Olympia's temple of Hestia, a building separate from the city's council hall and adjoining theatre. A temple to Hestia was in Andros.

Prospective founders of city-states and colonies sought approval and guidance not only of their "mother city" (represented by Hestia) but of Apollo, through one or another of his various oracles. He acted as consulting archegetes (founder) at Delphi. Among his various functions, he was patron god of colonies, architecture, constitutions and city planning. Additional patron deities might also be persuaded to support the new settlement, but without Hestia, her sacred hearth, an agora and prytaneum there could be no polis.

=== Hymns, odes and oaths ===
Hestia is the subject of two Homeric Hymns; hymn 24 is an invocation of five lines, alluding to her role as an attendant to Apollo and describing her as having sacred oil dripping from her hair and sharing a mind with all-wise Zeus, while hymn 29 says that Hestia has got 'highest honor', a goddess to whom mortals owe their banquets and pour wine first and last in her name.

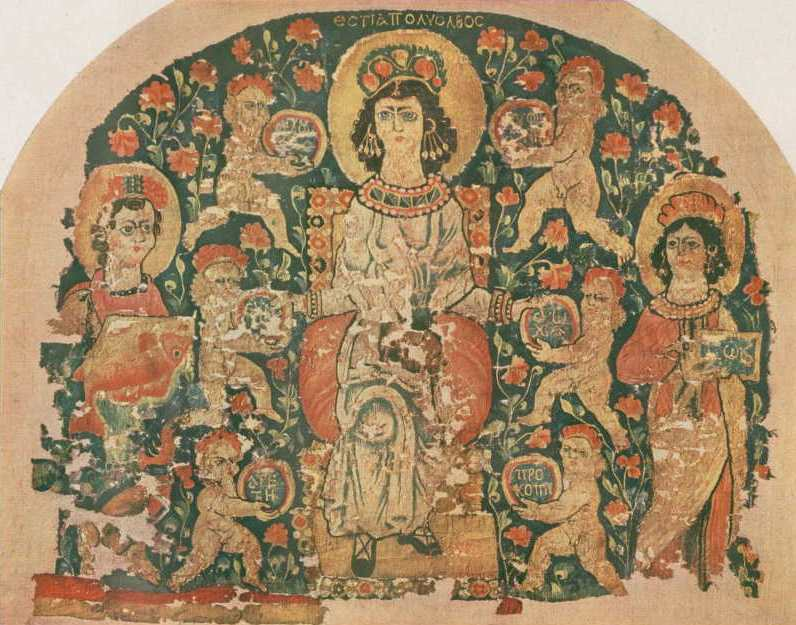
Hestia full of Blessings, Egypt, 6th century tapestry (Dumbarton Oaks Collection)

Bacchylides' half-preserved Ode 14b (For Aristoteles of Larisa) meanwhile credits "gold-throned" Hestia with the great prosperity of the rich Agathocleadae, a prominent family from Thessaly. Orphic Hymn 84 and Pindar's eleventh Nemean ode are also dedicated to Hestia.

In one military oath found at Acharnae, from the Sanctuary of Ares and Athena Areia dated to 350–325 BC, Hestia is called, among many others, to bear witness.

=== Hestia tapestry ===
The Hestia tapestry is a Byzantine tapestry, made in Egypt during the 6th century AD. It is a late and very rare representation of the goddess, whom it identifies in Greek as Hestia Polyolbos; (Greek: Ἑστία Πολύολβος "Hestia full of Blessings"). Its history and symbolism are discussed in Friedlander (1945).

== Genealogy ==
Hestia's family tree

Gaia
Uranus
Uranus's genitals | Coeus | Phoebe | Cronus | Rhea
Leto | Zeus | Hera | Poseidon | Hades | Demeter | HESTIA
Apollo | Artemis | a
b
Ares | Hephaestus
Metis
Athena
Maia
Hermes
Semele
Dionysus
Dione
a | b
Aphrodite

== See also ==
- Di Penates
- Sacred fire of Vesta
- Zalmoxis
- Deipneus Ancient Greek god of bread baking
