= Vorcon Wars =

1980s space-based play-by-mail game

- Publishers: Vorcon Games
- Years active: 1981 to unknown
- Genres: Space fantasy
- Languages: English
- Systems: Computer moderated
- Players: 16
- Playing time: Closed-ended
- Materials required: Instructions, order sheets, turn results, paper, pencil
- Media type: Play-by-mail

Vorcon Wars is an closed-ended, computer moderated, space-based play-by-mail game. It was published by Vorcon Games and running as early as 1981. 16 players vie for control of the planet Vorcon. Gameplay occurred on a hex map with over 1,000 hexes of varying types and resources. Players strived for expansion through combat and other means. By 1986, the publisher launched an additional version for play called Super Vorcon Wars. In 1989, Vorcon Wars placed second in the non-fantasy wargames section of Flagship's Spring 1989 Award Winners.

== Publication history ==
The game was running as early as 1981. It was published by Vorcon Games. John Nicholson of Vorcon Games created the game. The game shares some similarities with Starlord, but with added options. The game was computer moderated.

=== Super Vorcon Wars ===
By 1986, Vorcon Games published an updated version called Super Vorcon Wars while ran alongside the original game. It was "a more complicated version which involves infectious diseases destroying food supplies, multi-commander player positions, more aggressive native Vorcons and other such wonders" according to reviewer Brendon Kavanagh in Crash.

== Gameplay ==
16 players vie for control of the planet Vorcon following its leader's death. Gameplay occurred on a hex map with over 1,000 hexes of varying types and resources. Players see their hex and 18 surrounding hexes per turn as they strive for expansion through combat and other means.

== Reception ==
Tim Lewis and Williams McCarthy reviewed Vorcon Wars in the Spring 1984 issue of Flagship. They generally felt positively about the game, noting drawbacks in the lack of awareness outside of the hex maps provided per turn and the time needed at the outset to meet other players. In 1989, Vorcon Wars placed second in the non-fantasy wargames section of Flagship's Spring 1989 Award Winners (after Domination).

== See also ==
- List of play-by-mail games

== Bibliography ==
- Editors (Winter 1985). "Galactic View". Flagship. No. 9. p. 47.
- Editors (Winter 1989). "Spring 1989 Award Winners". Flagship. No. 21. p. 13.
- Lewis, Tim; McCarthy, William (Spring 1984). "Vorcon Wars". Flagship. No. 2. p. 11.
- Rayment, John (Summer 1985). "The Path to Vorcon Victory". Flagship. No. 7. pp. 16–17.
- Coulshed, Mark; Nicholson, John (Winter 1985). "Vorcon Super-Wars an open letter to John Nicholson". Flagship. No. 9. pp. 38–39.
- Kavanagh, Brendon (July 1986). "PBM Mailbox: Vorcon Wars". Crash. No. 30.
- Kavanagh, Brendon (September 1986). "PBM Mailbox: Super Vorcon Wars". Crash. No. 32.
