= Virgin goddess =

Goddess distinguished by virginity in Greek and Roman mythology

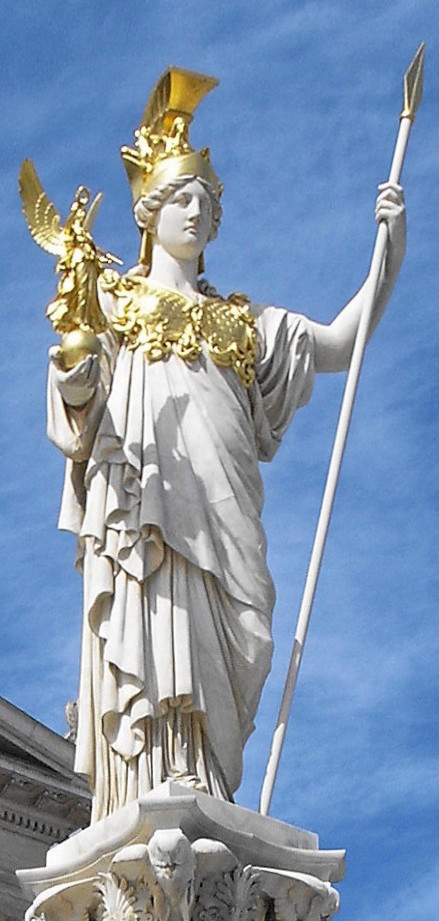
Athena Parthenos, one of three great virgin goddesses of Greek mythology. Statue in front of the Austrian Parliament Building in Vienna.

In Greek and Roman mythology, several goddesses are distinguished by their perpetual virginity. These goddesses included the Greek deities Hestia, Athena, and Artemis, along with their Roman equivalents, Vesta, Minerva, and Diana. In some instances, the inviolability of these goddesses was simply a detail of their mythology, while in other cases virginity was also associated with their worship and religious rites.

== Hestia and Vesta ==
In Greek myth, Hestia was one of the six children of Cronus and Rhea, the first of their three daughters, and thus the eldest of the twelve Olympians. (Note: In later traditions, Hestia tends to be replaced by Dionysus among the twelve Olympians, although she remains the daughter of Cronus and Rhea, and goddess of the hearth.) She was the elder sister of Zeus, Poseidon, Hades, Hera, and Demeter, and was revered as goddess of the hearth and of domestic life. She was courted by both Poseidon and Apollo, but rejected them, and swore a vow of perpetual virginity by her brother, Zeus, who bestowed upon her a share in the honour of all temples.

The Romans identified Hestia with Vesta, who was likewise regarded as goddess of the hearth and hospitality. Her worship is said to have predated the foundation of Rome, and her temple stood in the Roman Forum, between the Capitoline and Palatine Hills. It was tended by the Vestal Virgins, a college of priestesses said to have been instituted by Numa Pompilius, the second King of Rome. Like the goddess herself, the Vestals swore an oath of celibacy, which they were obliged to keep for the duration of their service, a term of thirty years, although they were free to marry afterward. The breaking of this vow was considered a greater offense than mere dereliction of duty; a Vestal who negligently allowed the sacred flame to be extinguished would be scourged, but one who violated her vow of celibacy would be punished by death, usually by being entombed alive in an underground chamber inside the Colline Gate.

== Athena and Minerva ==
Athena was generally regarded as the daughter of Zeus by his first wife, Metis, the goddess of prudence. She was a goddess of wisdom and war, agriculture, domestic activity, industry, law, and justice. Most traditions make her a virgin goddess, immune to the charms of romantic love or marriage; one of her most common epithets is Parthenos, "the maiden", (Note: Though best known from Athena, this epithet was also applied to other goddesses.) and her most famous temple from antiquity—still partially extant—is the Parthenon of Athens. In one tradition, Athena repulsed an attempt by Hephaestus to force himself upon her, and sent him fleeing. (Note: However, one of the myths in which Athena is not a virgin goddess makes Hephaestus and Athena the parents of Apollo.) Callimachus and the Pseudo-Apollodorus relate a myth that Teiresias was blinded after witnessing Athena naked in her bath; (Note: In this myth, Athena regretted Teiresias' blindness, and gave him the gift of prophecy in compensation. Other traditions attribute Teiresias' blindness to his having offended Hera, and his prophetic ability to Zeus.) a similar tradition was attached to Artemis and the hunter Actaeon. Athena is always dressed in Greek statuary, and at Athens her statue was fully covered when carried in public festivals. In some traditions, Athena received sacrifices of bulls, rams, or cows, but in others only female animals, excluding lambs. According to the Suda, after the site of Troy was reoccupied, to atone for the rape of Cassandra by Ajax the Less in the temple of Athena, Locrian maidens were sent as sacrifices to Athena, each year down to 346 BC.

In Roman mythology, Athena was identified with Minerva, who shared many of the traits and characteristics of her Greek counterpart. In relating the Judgement of Paris for Roman audiences, Ovid varies from the Greek traditions regarding Athena by describing Juno, Minerva, and Venus, stripped naked for the Trojan prince's evaluation. Although still regarded as a virgin goddess, the only manner in which this seems to have been reflected in Minerva's worship is that her sacrifices were to be calves that had been neither whipped nor yoked.

== Artemis and Diana ==
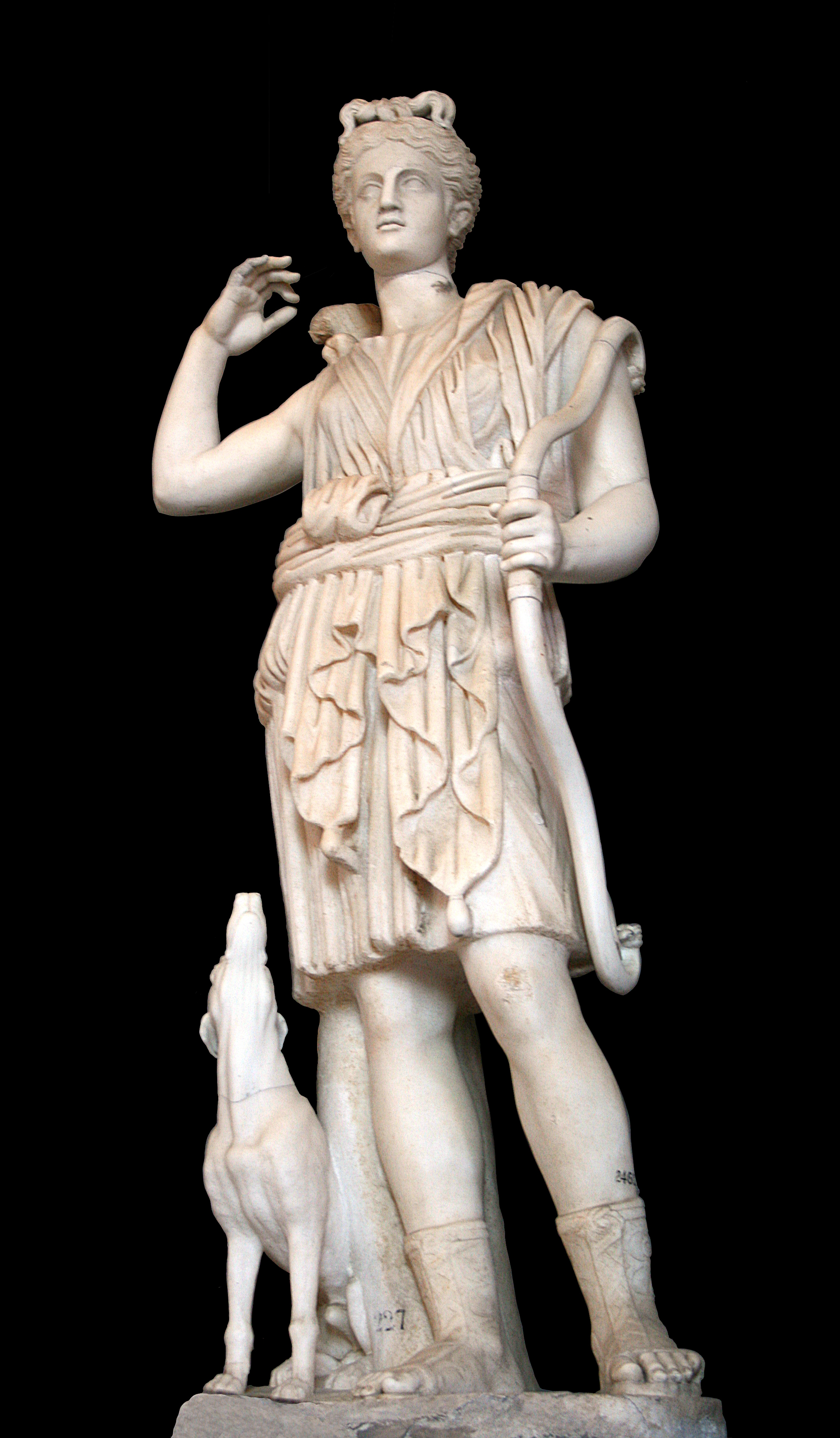
Diana, Roman copy of a Greek original. Galleria dei Candelabri, Vatican Museums. Photo by Jean-Pol Grandmont.

According to most traditions, Artemis was the daughter of Zeus and Leto, and the twin sister of Apollo. She was closely associated with her brother, some of whose attributes she shared, and according to one myth was also his wife. However, in all traditions Artemis was a maiden goddess, and fiercely protective of her chastity; her priests and priestesses were similarly expected to lead pure and unblemished lives. In one well-known myth, Artemis transformed the hunter Actaeon into a stag after he discovered her bathing in the woods, so that no man could boast of seeing her naked; he was then torn to pieces by his hounds.

The Roman goddess Diana, with whom Artemis was equated, was of undoubtedly of ancient worship, but the original nature of her cult remains mysterious. From the earliest period she was revered at a sacred grove near Aricia in Latium. At Rome, Diana was regarded as a special patron of the plebeians, and her temple on the Aventine Hill was built by Servius Tullius, the sixth Roman king. Diana was said to spurn all men who sought her hand, that she might remain a virgin forever. Men refrained from entering the temple of Diana that stood in the Vicus Patricius, although according to Plutarch, this was the result of a superstition, rather than any express prohibition; men freely entered other temples consecrated to Diana. In his Roman Questions, Plutarch relates that a man was torn to pieces by dogs after assaulting a woman who was worshipping at the temple.

== Bibliography ==
- Homer, Homeric Hymns (attributed).
- Hesiod, Theogony.
- Dionysius of Halicarnassus, Romaike Archaiologia (Roman Antiquities).
- Titus Livius (Livy), History of Rome.
- Publius Ovidius Naso (Ovid), Heroides, Metamorphoses.
- Lucius Mestrius Plutarchus (Plutarch), Lives of the Noble Greeks and Romans; Quaestiones Romanae (Roman Questions).
- Pausanias, Description of Greece.
- Arnobius, Adversus Gentes (Against the Pagans).
- Suda.
- Eustathius of Thessalonica, Commentary on Homer's Iliad and Odyssey.
- Dictionary of Greek and Roman Biography and Mythology, William Smith, ed., Little, Brown and Company, Boston (1849).
