= Starlord (play-by-mail game) =

1980s space-based play-by-mail game

- Designers: Mike Singleton
- Publishers: Flying Buffalo Inc., Rick Loomis PBM Games
- Years active: 1982 to unknown
- Genres: Space fantasy
- Languages: English
- Systems: Computer moderated
- Players: Up to 50
- Playing time: Open-ended
- Materials required: Instructions, order sheets, turn results, paper, pencil
- Media type: Play-by-mail

Starlord is an open-ended, computer moderated, space-based play-by-mail game. Designed and moderated by Mike Singleton, gameplay began initially in the United Kingdom, with Flying Buffalo launching a version in the United States in 1983. Gameplay was limited to 50 players roleplaying as Starlords with the goal of becoming emperor by conquering the Throne Star. Starlord was reviewed multiple times in magazines such as Dragon and The Space Gamer in the early 1980s, receiving generally positive reviews, with one reviewer noting the possibility of the game lasting for years.

== Publication history ==
Mike Singleton designed Starlord. The game was computer moderated. Singleton moderated the game using his Commodore PET. Singleton started gameplay in the United Kingdom, but as of 1983, Flying Buffalo began running the game in the United States as well.

Starlord was based on a 1977 board game of the same name invented by Gary Bedrosian and Lee Elmendorf.

== Gameplay ==
The game depicted a declining galactic empire in a galaxy with 1000 stars, in which 50 players are "starlords" who attempt to take over the Throne Star and become the new emperor. At the outset, players controlled one Base Star out of 1,000 available. Stars were activity hubs, not celestial objects, and comprised 14 types. The "Empyr" controlled the non-assigned stars, "with up to ten ships at each and several hundred at the central Throne Star". However, "sadly, the last Emperor has died, and the Empyr is run by imperial computers", proving an opportunity for players to seize the throne. A player that took the Throne Star received various benefits, including control of the Empyr's forces and free turns, but also acquired "up to 49 enemies".

Lee Simpson noted in the Winter 1983 issue of Flagship magazine that "Mike Singleton has since admitted, in earlier Starlord games the Throne Star was initially too lightly garrisoned", allowing players to become Emperor early in the game.

== Reception ==
W.G. Armintrout reviewed Starlord in the March 1982 issues of The Space Gamer. Armintrout commented that "In my opinion, Starlord is one of the top five PBM games going. I highly recommend it to all gamers, even those who have never yet tried this type of game."

In the April 1983 edition of Dragon (Issue 72), Michael Gray stated "A player who becomes Emperor early in a game, and is then dethroned and eliminated, may still win the game by accumulating lots of points during his or her reign. But with 50 players per game, Starlord could take many years to complete."

W.G. Armintrout reviewed Starlord again in the May–June 1983 issue of The Space Gamer. Armintrout commented that "Starlord continues to receive my highest recommendation – a masterpiece of game design, ridiculously easy to play yet moderately challenging. Those who have never tried PBM could start here. I have only two quibbles: You can't choose your player name (you are named after your Base Star), and the map should have a circular frame."

== See also ==
- List of play-by-mail games
- Vorcon Wars

== Bibliography ==
- Armintrout, W.G. (March 1982). "Featured Review: Starlord". The Space Gamer. No. 49. Steve Jackson Games. pp. 12–13.
- Armintrout, W.G. (May–June 1983). "Star Mail: Three New PBM Space Games". The Space Gamer. No. 63. Steve Jackson Games. pp. 6–8.
- Carrier, Chris (March–April 1985). "Starlord". Paper Mayhem. No. 11. p. 13.
- Maher, Jimmy. "Mike Singleton and The Lords of Midnight: The Digital Antiquarian". Filfre.net.
- Gray, Michael (April 1983). "The PBM scene: Facts you can use when YOU choose what game to play". Dragon. No. 72. TSR, Inc. p. 31.
- Simpson, Lee (Winter 1983). "The View from the Throne". Flagship. No. 1. pp. 4–6.
