= Vesta (goddess) =

Ancient Roman goddess of the hearth, home, and family

- Goddess of the hearth, home, family, virginity, and sacred fire
- Member of the Dii Consentes
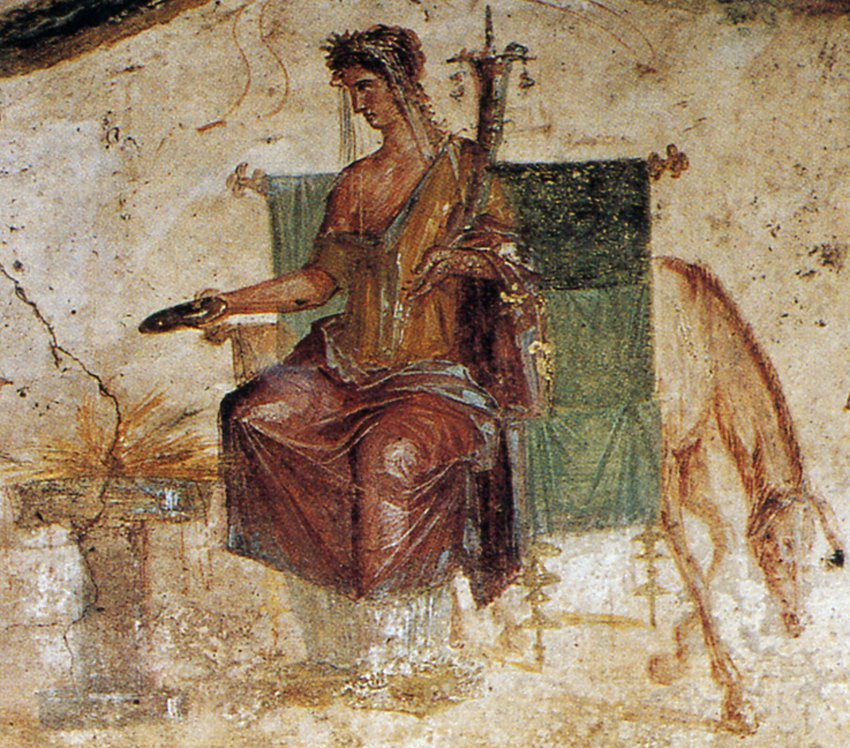
- Rare depiction of Vesta in human form, as the central figure from the Lararium of a bakery at Pompeii, 1st century
- Major cult center: Temple of Vesta, Rome
- Abode: Forum Romanum
- Animals: Donkey
- Symbol: The hearth, sacred fire
- Festivals: Vestalia

Genealogy
- Parents: Saturn and Ops
- Siblings: Jupiter, Neptune, Pluto, Juno, Ceres

Equivalents
- Greek: Hestia

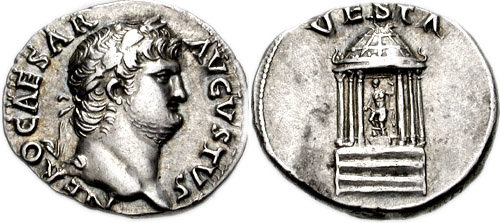
Coin issued under Nero: the reverse depicts the cult statue of Vesta, holding a patera and scepter, within her hexastyle temple.

Vesta (Classical Latin: [ˈwɛs.ta]) is the virgin goddess of the hearth, home, and family in Roman religion. She was rarely depicted in human form, and was more often represented by the fire of her temple in the Forum Romanum. Entry to her temple was permitted only to her priestesses, the Vestal Virgins. Their virginity was deemed essential to Rome's survival; if found guilty of inchastity, they were buried or entombed alive. As Vesta was considered a guardian of the Roman people, her festival, the Vestalia (7–15 June), was regarded as one of the most important Roman holidays. During the Vestalia privileged matrons walked barefoot through the city to the temple, where they presented food offerings. Such was Vesta's importance to Roman religion that following the rise of Christianity, hers was one of the last non-Christian cults still active, until it was forcibly disbanded by the Christian emperor Theodosius I in AD 391.

The myths depicting Vesta and her priestesses were few; the most notable of them were tales of miraculous impregnation of a virgin priestess by a phallus appearing in the flames of the sacred hearth — the manifestation of the goddess combined with a male supernatural being. In some Roman traditions, Rome's founders Romulus and Remus and the benevolent king Servius Tullius were conceived in this way. Vesta was among the Dii Consentes, twelve of the most honored gods in the Roman pantheon. She was the daughter of Saturn and Ops, and sister of Jupiter, Neptune, Pluto, Juno, and Ceres. Her Greek equivalent is Hestia.

== Etymology ==
Ovid derived Vesta from Latin vi stando – "standing by power". Cicero supposed that the Latin name Vesta derives from its Greek counterpart, Hestia, which Cornutus claimed to have derived from Greek hestanai dia pantos ("standing for ever"). This etymology is offered by Servius as well. Another proposed etymology is that Vesta derives from Latin vestio ("clothe"), as well as from Greek ἑστία (hestia, "hearth" = focus urbis). None, except perhaps the last, are probable.

Georges Dumézil (1898–1986), a French comparative philologist, surmised that the name of the goddess derives from Proto-Indo-European root *h₁eu-, via the derivative form *h₁eu-s- which alternates with *h₁w-es-. The former is found in Greek εὕειν heuein, Latin urit, ustio and Vedic osathi all conveying 'burning' and the second is found in Vesta. (Beekes considered the Greek goddess-name Ἑστία Hestia is probably unrelated.) See also Gallic Celtic visc "fire."

James Wilson Poultney suggested that Vesta may be related to the Umbrian god Uestisier (gen.)/Vestiçe (dat.) (as if Latin *Vesticius), itself related to Umbrian terms for 'libation' uestisiar (gen.sg.), 'pour a libation' uesticatu (imv.) from *westikia and *westikato:d respectively. Perhaps also related to Oscan Veskeí from the Oscan Tablet also known as the Agnone Dedication.

== History ==
=== Origin ===
According to tradition, worship of Vesta in Italy began in Lavinium, the mother-city of Alba Longa and the first settlement by the Trojan refugees after their flight from Troy's destruction, led there by Aeneas and guided by Venus. It was believed that from Lavinium, the worship of Vesta was transferred to Alba Longa, a belief evident in the custom of Roman magistrates going to Lavinium, when appointed to higher office, and offering sacrifice both to Vesta and the household gods of the Roman state known as Penates, whose images were kept in Vesta's temple. Alongside those household gods was Vesta, whom the Roman poet refers to as Vesta Iliaca ("Vesta of Ilium/Troy"). Vesta's sacred hearth was also named Iliaci foci ("hearth of Ilium/Troy").

Worship of Vesta, like the worship of many gods, originated in the home, but in Roman historical tradition, it became an established cult of state during the reign of either Romulus, or Numa Pompilius (sources disagree, but most say Numa). The priestesses of Vesta, known as Vestal Virgins, administered her temple and sustained its sacred fire. The existence of Vestal Virgins in Alba Longa is connected with early Roman traditions, for the mother of Romulus and Remus, Rhea Silvia, was a priestess of Vesta, impregnated by either Mars or Hercules.

=== Roman Empire ===
Roman tradition required that the leading priest of the Roman state, the pontifex maximus reside in a domus publicus ("publicly owned house"). After assuming the office of pontifex maximus in 12 BC, Augustus gave part of his private house to the Vestals as public property and incorporated a new shrine of Vesta within it. The old shrine remained in the Forum Romanum's temple of Vesta, but Augustus' gift linked the public hearth of the state with the official home of the pontifex maximus and the emperor's Palatine residence. This strengthened the connection between the office of pontifex maximus and the cult of Vesta. Henceforth, the office of pontifex maximus was tied to the title of emperor; Emperors were automatically priests of Vesta, and the pontifices were sometimes referred to as pontifices Vestae ("priests of Vesta"). In 12 BC, 28 April (first of the five day Floralia) was chosen ex senatus consultum to commemorate the new shrine of Vesta in Augustus' home on the Palatine. The latter's hearth was the focus of the Imperial household's traditional religious observances. Various emperors led official revivals and promotions of the Vestals' cult, which in its various locations remained central to Rome's ancient traditional cults into the 4th century. Dedications in the Atrium of Vesta, dating predominantly AD 200 to 300, attest to the service of several Virgines Vestales Maxime. Vesta's worship began to decline with the rise of Christianity. In ca. 379, Gratian stepped down as pontifex maximus; in 382 he confiscated the Atrium Vestae and simultaneously withdrew its public funding. In 391, despite official and public protests, Theodosius I closed the temple, and extinguished the sacred flame. Finally, Coelia Concordia stepped down as the last Vestalis Maxima ("chief Vestal") in 394.

== Depictions ==
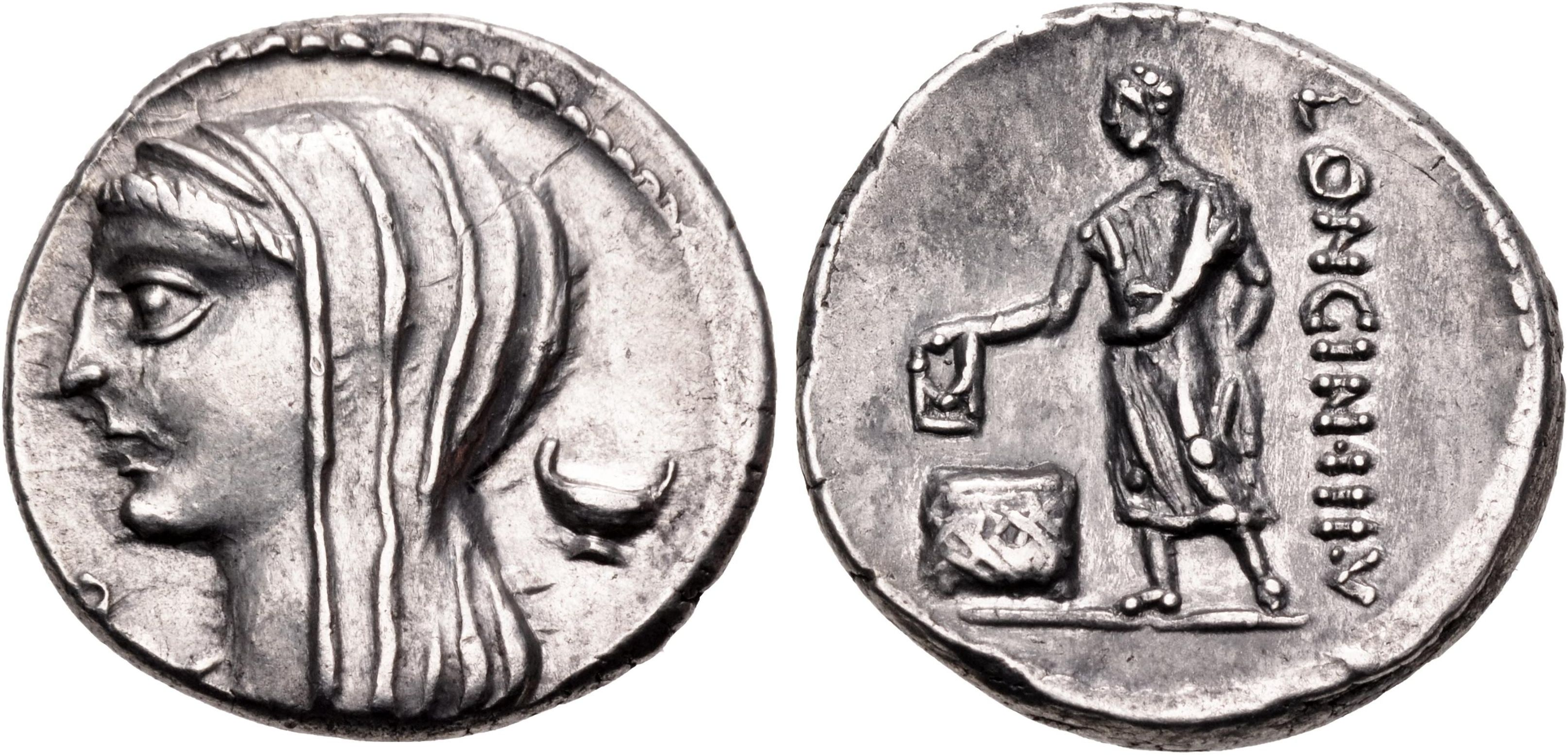
Denarius of 60 BC; veiled and draped Vesta on the left, with a lamp next to her.

Depicted as a good-mannered deity who never involved herself in the quarreling of other gods, Vesta was ambiguous at times due to her contradictory association with the phallus. She is considered the embodiment of the "Phallic Mother" by proponents of 20th Century psychoanalysis: she was not only the most virgin and clean of all the gods, but was addressed as mother and granted fertility. Mythographers tell us that Vesta had no myths save being identified as one of the oldest of the gods who was entitled to preference in veneration and offerings over all other gods. Unlike most gods, Vesta was hardly depicted directly; nonetheless, she was symbolized by her flame, the fire stick, and a ritual phallus (the fascinus).

While Vesta was the flame itself, the symbol of the phallus might relate to Vesta's function in fertility cults, but it maybe also invoked the goddess herself due to its relation to the fire stick used to light the sacred flame. She was sometimes thought of as a personification of the fire stick which was inserted into a hollow piece of wood and rotated – in a phallic manner – to light her flame.

=== Hearth ===
Concerning the status of Vesta's hearth, Dionysius of Halicarnassus had this to say: "And they regard the fire as consecrated to Vesta, because that goddess, being the Earth and occupying the central position in the universe, kindles the celestial fires from herself." Ovid agreed, saying: "Vesta is the same as the earth; both have the perennial fire: the Earth and the sacred Fire are both symbolic of home." The sacred flames of the hearth were believed to be indispensable for the preservation and continuity of the Roman State: Cicero states it explicitly. The purity of the flames symbolised the vital force that is the root of the life of the community. It was also because the virgins' ritual concern extended to the agricultural cycle and ensured a good harvest that Vesta enjoyed the title of Mater ("Mother").

The fecundating power of sacred fire is testified to in Plutarch's version of the birth of Romulus and Remus, in the birth of king Servius Tullius, whose mother Ocresia becomes pregnant after sitting upon a phallus that appeared among the ashes of the ara of the god Vulcanus by order of Tanaquil wife of king Tarquinius Priscus, and in the birth of Caeculus, the founder of Praeneste, who had the power to kindle or extinguish fires at will. All these mythical or semi-legendary characters show a mystical mastery of fire. Servius's hair was kindled by his father without hurting him, and even his statue in the temple of Fortuna Primigenia was unharmed by fire after his assassination.

=== Marriage ===
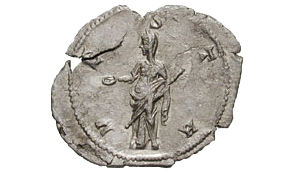
Vesta holding a patera and scepter on the reverse of an antoninianus (ca. 253 AD)

Vesta was connected to liminality, and the limen ("threshold") was sacred to her: brides were careful not to step on it, else they commit sacrilege by kicking a sacred object. Servius explains that it would be poor judgement for a virgin bride to kick an object sacred to Vesta, a goddess who holds chastity sacred. On the other hand, it might merely have been because Romans considered it bad luck to trample any object sacred to the gods. In Plautus' Casina, the bride Casina is cautioned to lift her feet carefully over the threshold following her wedding so she would have the upper hand in her marriage. Likewise, Catullus cautions a bride to keep her feet over the threshold "with a good omen". It is possible that the concern that brides not touch the threshold (limen) with their feet may be the source of the tradition of a husband carrying his new bride across the threshold when entering their new home following their marriage.

In Roman belief, Vesta was present in all weddings, and so was Janus: Vesta was the threshold and Janus the doorway. Similarly, Vesta and Janus were invoked in every sacrifice. It has been noted that because they were invoked so often, the evocation of the two came to simply mean, "to pray". In addition, Vesta was present with Janus in all sacrifices as well. It has also been noted that neither of them were consistently illustrated as human. This has been suggested as evidence of their ancient Italic origin, because neither of them was "fully anthropomorphized"

=== Agriculture ===
Counted among the agricultural deities, Vesta has been linked to the deities Tellus and Terra in separate accounts. In Antiquitates rerum humanarum et divinarum, Varro links Vesta to Tellus. He says: "They think Tellus... is Vesta, because she is 'vested' in flowers". Verrius Flaccus, however, had identified Vesta with Terra. Ovid hints at Vesta's connection to both of the deities.

== Temple ==
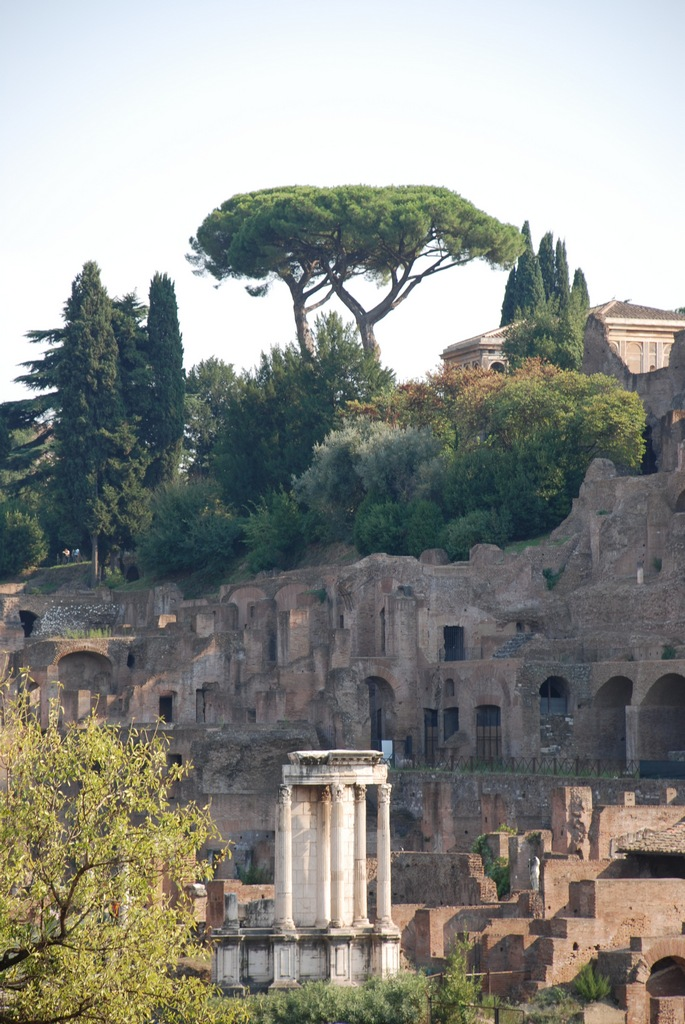
Temple of Vesta in a 2009 photo

Where the majority of temples would have a statue, that of Vesta had a hearth. The fire was a religious center of Roman worship, the common hearth (focus publicus) of the whole Roman people. The Vestals were obliged to keep the sacred fire alight. If the fire went out, it must be lit from an arbor felix ("auspicious tree", probably an oak). Water was not allowed into the inner aedes nor could it remain longer than strictly necessary in or on the nearby premises. It was carried by the Vestales in vessels called futiles which had a tiny foot that made them unstable.

The temple of Vesta held not only the ignes aeternum ("sacred fire"), but the Palladium of Pallas Athena and the di Penates as well. Both of these items are said to have been brought into Italy by Aeneas. The Palladium of Athena was, in the words of Livy: "fatale pignus imperii Romani" ("[a] pledge of destiny for the Roman empire"). Such was the Palladium's importance that when the Gauls sacked Rome in 390 BC, the Vestals first buried the Palladium before removing themselves to the safety of nearby Caere. Such objects were kept in the penus Vestae (i.e., the sacred repository of the temple of Vesta).

Despite being one of the most spiritual of Roman Shrines, that of Vesta was not a templum in the Roman sense of the word; that is, it was not a building consecrated by the augurs and so it could not be used for meetings by Roman officials. It has also been claimed that the shrine of Vesta in Rome was not a templum because of its round shape. However, a templum was not a building, but rather a sacred space that could contain a building of either rectangular or circular shape. In fact, early templa were often altars that were consecrated and later had buildings erected around them. The temple of Vesta in Rome was an aedes and not a templum most likely because of the character of the cult of Vesta, the exact reason being unknown.

== Vestal Virgins ==
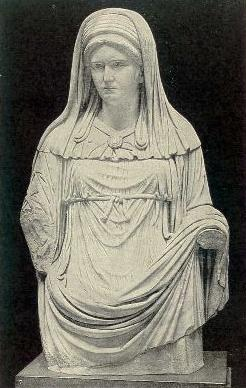
The Virgo Vestalis Maxima depicted in a Roman statue

The Vestales were one of the few full-time clergy positions in Roman religion. They were drawn from the patrician class and were required to swear an oath of absolute chastity for 30 years. It was because of this requirement that the Vestales were named the Vestal virgins. They wore a particular style of dress and were not allowed to let the fire go out on pain of a whipping. On becoming a priestess, a Vestal Virgin was legally emancipated from her father's authority. The Vestal Virgins lived together in a house near the Forum (Atrium Vestae), supervised by the Pontifex Maximus. A Vestal who broke her vow of chastity could be tried for incestum and if found guilty, buried alive in the Campus Sceleris ('Field of Wickedness').

The februae (lanas: woolen threads) that were an essential part of the Vestal costume were supplied by the rex sacrorum and flamen dialis. Once a year, the Vestals gave the rex sacrorum a ritualised warning to be vigilant in his duties, using the phrase "Vigilasne rex, vigila!" In Cicero's opinion, the Vestals ensured that Rome kept its contact with the gods.

A peculiar duty of the Vestals was the preparation and conservation of the sacred salamoia muries used for the savouring of the mola salsa, a salted flour mixture to be sprinkled on sacrificial victims (hence the Latin verb immolare, "to put on the mola, to sacrifice"). This dough too was prepared by them on fixed days. Theirs also the task of preparing the suffimen for the Parilia.

== Festivals ==
Domestic and family life in general were represented by the festival of the goddess of the house and of the spirits of the storechamber – Vesta and the Penates – on Vestalia (7 – 15 June). On the first day of festivities the penus Vestae (sanctum sanctorum of her temple which was usually curtained off) was opened, for the only time during the year, at which women offered sacrifices. As long as the curtain remained open, mothers could come, barefoot and disheveled, to leave offerings to the goddess in exchange for a blessing to them and their family. The animal consecrated to Vesta, the donkey, was crowned with garlands of flowers and bits of bread on 9 June. The final day (15 June) was Q(uando) S(tercum) D(elatum) F(as) ["when dung may be removed lawfully"] – the penus Vestae was solemnly closed; the Flaminica Dialis observed mourning, and the temple was subjected to a purification called stercoratio: the filth was swept from the temple and carried next by the route called clivus Capitolinus and then into the Tiber.

In the military Feriale Duranum (AD 224) the first day of Vestalia is Vesta apperit[ur] and the last day is Vesta cluditur. This year records a supplicatio dedicated to Vesta for 9 June, and records of the Arval Brethren on this day observe a blood sacrifice to her as well. Found in the Codex-Calendar of 354, 13 February had become the holiday Virgo Vestalis parentat, a public holiday which by then had replaced the older parentalia where the sacrifice of cattle over flames is now dedicated to Vesta. This also marks the first participation of the Vestal Virgins in rites associated with the Manes.

== Mythography ==
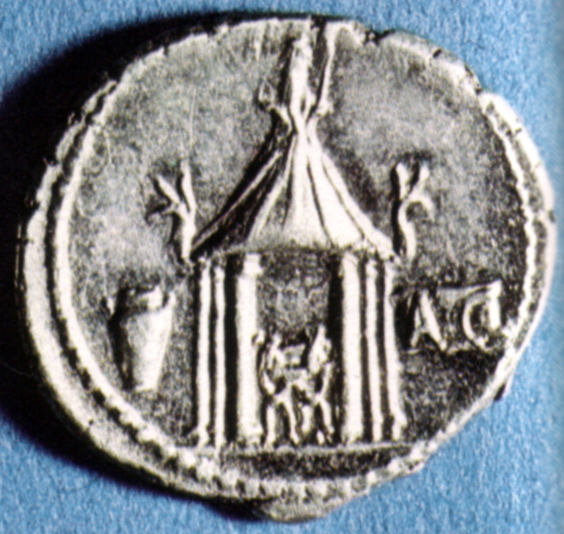
Temple of Vesta on the reverse of a denarius issued in 55 BC by Quintus Cassius Longinus.

Vesta had no official mythology, and she existed as an abstract goddess of the hearth and of chastity. Only in the account of Ovid at Cybele's party does Vesta appear directly in a myth.

=== Birth of Romulus and Remus ===
Plutarch, in his Life of Romulus, told a variation of Romulus' birth citing a compilation of Italian history by a Promathion. In this version, while Tarchetius was king of Alba Longa, a phantom phallus appeared in his hearth. The king visited an oracle of Tethys in Etrusca, who told him that a virgin must have intercourse with this phallus. Tarchetius instructed one of his daughters to do so, but she refused sending a handmaiden in her place. Angered, the king contemplated her execution; however, Vesta appeared to him in his sleep and forbade it. When the handmaid gave birth to twins by the phantom, Tarchetius handed them over to his subordinate, Teratius, with orders to destroy them. Teratius instead carried them to the shore of the river Tiber and laid them there. Then a she-wolf came to them and breastfed them, birds brought them food and fed them, before an amazed cow-herder came and took the children home with him. Thus they were saved, and when they were grown up, they set upon Tarchetius and overcame him. Plutarch concludes with a contrast between Promathion's version of Romulus' birth and that of the more credible Fabius Pictor which he describes in a detailed narrative and lends support to.

=== Conception of Servius Tullius ===
Dionysius of Halicarnassus recounts a local story regarding the birth of king Servius Tullius. In it, a phallus rose from the hearth of Vesta in Numa's palace, and Ocresia was the first to see it. She immediately informed the king and queen. King Tarquinius, upon hearing this, was astonished; but Tanaquil, whose knowledge of divination was well-known, told him it was a blessing that a birth by the hearth's phallus and a mortal woman would produce superior offspring. The king then chose Ocresia to have intercourse with it, for she had seen it first. During which either Vulcan, or the tutelary deity of the house, appeared to her. After disappearing, she conceived and delivered Tullius. This story of his birth could be based on his name as Servius would euphemistically mean "son of servant", because his mother was a handmaiden.

=== Impropriety of Priapus ===
In book 6 of Ovid's Fasti: Cybele invited all the gods, satyrs, rural divinities, and nymphs to a feast, though Silenus came uninvited with his donkey. At some point during the feast, Vesta lay at rest, and Priapus spotted her. As he approached her in order to violate her, the ass brought by Silenus let out a timely bray, whereupon Vesta awoke and Priapus barely escaped the outraged gods. Mentioned in book 1 of the Fasti is a similar instance of Priapus' impropriety involving Lotis and Priapus. The Vesta-Priapus account is not as well developed as that involving Lotis, and critics suggest the account of Vesta and Priapus only exists to create a cult drama. Ovid says the donkey was adorned with necklaces of bread-bits in memory of the event. Elsewhere, he says donkeys were honored on 9 June during the Vestalia in thanks for the services they provided in the bakeries.

== Vesta outside Rome ==
Vesta's cult is attested at Bovillae, Lavinium and Tibur. The Alban Vestals at Bovillae (Albanae Longanae Bovillenses) were supposedly a continuation of the original Alban Vestals, and Lavinium had the Vestals of the Laurentes Lavinates, both orders rooted in ancient traditions that were thought to predate Rome's foundation. In a later period, Tibur's vestals are attested epigraphically. Vestals might have been present at the sanctuary of Diana Nemorensis near Aricia.

== See also ==
- Clerical celibacy
- House of the Vestals
- Temple of Vesta, Tivoli
- Asteroid (4) Vesta
- Fornax (mythology); Roman goddess of ovens.

== Sources ==
=== Ancient ===
- Gaius Valerius Catullus in Carmina
- Marcus Tullius Cicero in Pro Fonteio
- Dionysius of Halicarnassus in Romaike Archaiologia
- Gaius Acilius in Annales Aciliani
- Aulus Gellius in Noctes Atticae
- Maurus Servius Honoratus in In Vergilii Aeneidem commentarii
- Maurus Servius Honoratus in Eclogues
- Publius Ovidius Naso in Amores
- Publius Ovidius Naso in Fasti
- Gaius Petronius Arbiter in Satyricon
- Titus Maccius Plautus in Casina
- Gaius Plinius Secundus in Naturalis Historia
- Lucius Mestrius Plutarchus in Life of Numa
- Lucius Mestrius Plutarchus in Life of Romulus

=== Modern ===
- Beard, Mary; North, John; Price, Simon (1998a). Religions of Rome: Volume 1, A History. Cambridge University Press. ISBN 0-521-30401-6.
- Beard, Mary; North, John; Price, Simon (1998b). Religions of Rome: Volume 2, A Sourcebook. Cambridge University Press. ISBN 0-521-45015-2.
- Beekes, Robert (2010). Etymological Dictionary of Greek. Leiden-Boston: Brill. ISBN 978-900417418-4.
- Benveniste, Émile (1969). Le vocabulaire des institutions indo-européenes (in French). Paris: Éditions de Minuit.
- Bowerstock, Glenn Warren; Brown, Peter; Grabar, Oleg (1999). Late Antiquity: A Guide to the Postclassical World. The Belknap Press of Harvard University Press. ISBN 978-0-674-51173-6 – via Internet Archive.
- Brulé, Pierre (1987). La Fille d'Athènes: la religion des filles à l'époque classique: mythes, cultes et société (in French). Paris: Belles lettres. ISBN 978-2-25160-363-6.
- Cecere, M. G. Granino (2003). "Vestali non di Roma". Studi di Epigrafia Latina (in Italian). 20.
- The Chiron Dictionary of Greek & Roman Mythology: Gods and Goddesses, Heroes, Places, and Events of Antiquity. Chiron Publications. 1993. ISBN 978-0-933029-82-8 – via Internet Archive.
- Deroux, Carl (2008). Studies in Latin Literature and Roman History. Vol. 315. Latomus.
- DiLuzio, Meghan J. (2016). A Place at the Altar: Priestesses in Republican Rome. Princeton University Press. ISBN 978-0-691-16957-6.
- Dixon-Kennedy, Mike (1998). Encyclopedia of Greco-Roman Mythology. Bloomsbury Academic. ISBN 978-1-57607-094-9.
- Dubourdieu, Annie (1989). Les Origines et le développement du culte des pénates à Rome (in French). École française de Rome. ISBN 978-2-72830-162-1.
- Dumézil, Georges (1974). "2". La religion romaine archaïque, avec un appendice sur la religion des Étrusques (in French). Paris: Payot. part 2.
- Fraschetti, Augusto (2001). Roman Women. Translated by Linda Lappin. University of Chicago Press. ISBN 978-022626093-8.
- Frazer, James George (1929). Fastorum libri sex. Vol. IV. London: Macmillan and Co.
- Frothinghom, A. L. (1914). "Circular Templum and Mundus. Was the Templum Only Rectangular?". American Journal of Archaeology. 18.
- Geffcken, Katherine A.; Dickison, Sheila Kathryn; Hallett, Judith P. (2000). Rome and Her Monuments: Essays on the City and Literature of Rome in Honor of Katherine A. Geffcken. Wauconda, Illinois: Bolchazy-Carducci Publishers. ISBN 978-0-86516-457-4.
- Hemelrijk, Emily (2015). Hidden Lives, Public Personae: Women and Civic Life in the Roman West. New York: Oxford University Press. ISBN 978-019025188-8.
- Herbert-Brown, Geraldine (1994). Ovid and the Fasti: An Historical Study. Oxford: Clarendon Press Oxford. ISBN 978-0-19-814935-4.
- Hersch, Karen K. (2010). The Roman Wedding: Ritual and Meaning in Antiquity. Cambridge University Press. ISBN 978-0-521-19610-9.
- Johnston, Sarah Iles (2004). Religions of the Ancient World: A Guide. The Belknap Press of Harvard University Press. ISBN 978-0-674-01517-3.
- Lefkowitz, Mary R.; Fant, Maureen B. (2005). Women's Life in Greece and Rome: A Source Book in Translation. Johns Hopkins University Press. ISBN 978-0-8018-8310-1.
- Littlewood, R. Joy (2006). A Commentary on Ovid: Fasti book VI. Oxford; New York: Oxford University Press. ISBN 978-0-19927-134-4.
- Marouzeau, Jules (2006). Revue des études latines (in French). Société d'Édition Les Belles Lettres.
- Middleton, John Henry (1886). "The Temple and Atrium of Vesta and the Regia". Archaeologia: 395. This article incorporates text from this source, which is in the public domain.
- Middleton, John Henry (1892). The Remains of Ancient Rome. Vol. 1. p. 295. This article incorporates text from this source, which is in the public domain.
- Mommsen, Theodor (1894). The History of Rome. Vol. I. This article incorporates text from this source, which is in the public domain.
- Morford, Mark P. O.; Lenardon, Robert J. (1999). Classical Mythology (Sixth ed.). Oxford University Press.
- Newlands, Carole Elizabeth (1995). Playing with Time: Ovid and the Fasti. Vol. 55. Cornell University Press. ISBN 978-0-8014-3080-0.
- Noehden, G. H. (1817). "On the Worship of Vesta, and the Holy Fire, in Ancient Rome: with an Account of the Vestal Virgins". The Classical Journal. 15.
- Paschalis, Michael (1977). Virgil's Aeneid: Semantic Relations and Proper Names. Clarendon Press Oxford. ISBN 978-0-19-814688-9.
- Salzman, Michele Rene (1990). On Roman Time: The Codex-Calendar of 354 and the Rhythms of Urban Life in Late Antiquity. University of California Press. ISBN 978-0-520-06566-6.
- Schroeder, Jeanne Lorraine (1998). The Vestal and the Fasces: Hegel, Lacan, Property, and the Feminine. London: University of California Press. ISBN 978-0-520-21145-2.
- Severy, Beth (2003). Augustus and the Family at the Birth of the Roman Empire. Routledge. ISBN 978-0-203-21143-4.
- Thédenat, Henry (1908). Le Forum romain et les forums impériaux (in French). Paris: Hachette et Cie.
- Watkin, David (2009). The Roman Forum. Harvard University Press. ISBN 978-0-674-03341-2 – via Internet Archive.
- Williams, Rome (2008). The Original Dysfunctional Family: Basic Classical Mythology for the New Millennium. Mundelein, Illinois: Bolchazy-Carducci. ISBN 978-0-86516-690-5.
- Wiseman, Timothy Peter (1995), Remus: A Roman Myth, Cambridge University Press, ISBN 0-521-41981-6
