= Tarchetius =

Tarchetius (Ancient Greek: Ταρχέτιος) was a mythical king of the Albans, who in some traditions is connected with Romulus and Remus, the founders of Rome. He was described as lawless and cruel. His story is described by Plutarch in his work Romulus.

During his reign, he was visited by a strange phantom in his house, namely, a phallus rose out of the hearth and remained there for many days. An oracle of Tethys in Tuscany declared that a virgin must have intercourse with this phantom and would give birth to a son remarkable for his valor, strength, and good fortune.

Tarchetius reported the oracle to one of his daughters and ordered her to obey it, but she refused and instead sent one of her maidservants to the phantom. When Tarchetius discovered this deception, he became enraged and intended to put both the daughter and the handmaid to death. However, the goddess Hestia appeared to him in a dream and forbade the killings.

Instead, Tarchetius imprisoned the two women and imposed on them the task of weaving a web, promising that they would be given in marriage once it was finished. During the day the women wove the cloth, but at night Tarchetius secretly ordered other maidens to unravel it, ensuring that the work was never completed. In time, the handmaid gave birth to twin boys by the phantom.

Tarchetius then gave the twins to a man named Teratius with orders to destroy them. Teratius carried the infants to the riverbank and left them there. A she-wolf came and suckled the babies, while birds brought food to them, until a cowherd discovered the children and took them home. The twins survived, grew to manhood, and eventually attacked Tarchetius and defeated him. This account is attributed to Promathion, who wrote a history of Italy.
