= Prytaneion =

Seat of government of a city in ancient Greece

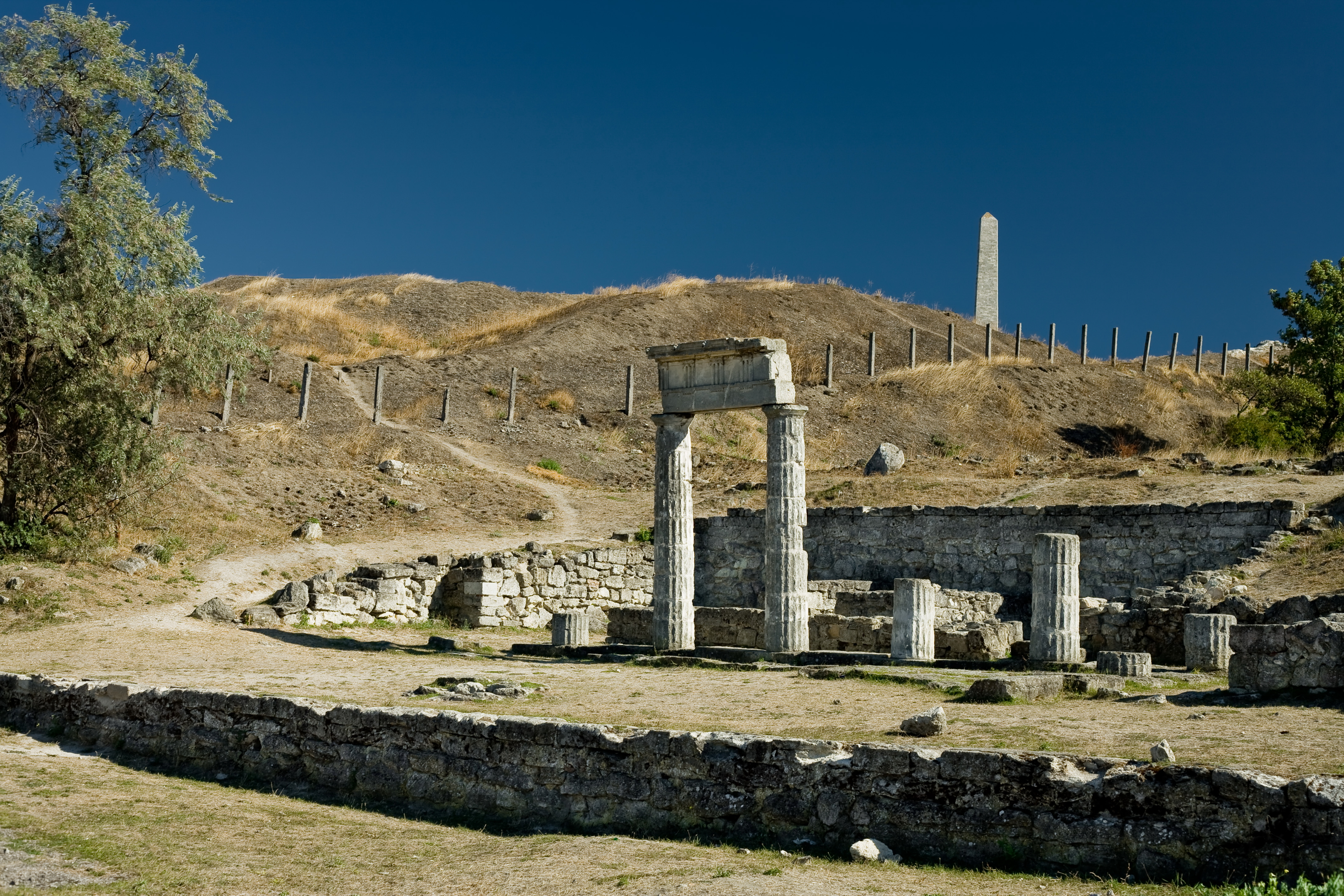
Prytaneion of Panticapaeum, II b.c. (Kerch, Crimea)

A prytaneion (Ancient Greek: Πρυτανεῖον, Latin: prytanēum) was the seat of the prytaneis (executive), and so the seat of government in ancient Greece. The term is used to describe any of a range of ancient structures where officials met (normally relating to the government of a city), but the term is also used to refer to the building where the officials and winners of the Olympic Games met at Olympia. The prytaneion normally stood in the centre of the city, in the agora.

In general in ancient Greece, each state, city or village possessed its own central hearth and sacred fire, the prytaneion, representing the unity and vitality of the community. The fire was kept alight continuously, tended by the king or members of his family. The building in which this fire was kept was the prytaneion, and the chieftain (the king or prytanis) probably made it his residence. The building contained the holy fire of Hestia, the goddess of the hearth, and symbol of the life of the city.

The term prytanis (pl. prytaneis) is generally applied specially to those who, after the abolition of absolute monarchy, held the chief office in the state. Rulers of this name are found at Rhodos as late as the 1st century BC.

== Function ==
The prytaneion was regarded as the religious and political center of the community and was thus the nucleus of all government, and the official "home" of the whole people. When members of the state went forth to found a new colony they took with them a brand from the prytaneion altar to kindle the new fire in the colony; the fatherless daughters of Aristides, who were regarded as children of the state at Athens, were married from the prytaneion as from their home; Thucydides informs us that in the Synoikism of Theseus the prytanea of all the separate communities were joined in the central prytaneion of Athens as a symbol of the union; foreign ambassadors and citizens who had deserved especially well of the state were entertained in the prytaneion as public guests. This is the function that Socrates referred to in Plato's Apology when he said that instead of death he should be sentenced to be cared for in the prytaneion.

== Athens ==
The site of the prytaneion at Athens cannot be definitely fixed; it is generally supposed that in the course of time several buildings bore the name. The prytaneion, mentioned by Pausanias, and probably the original center of the ancient city, was situated somewhere east of the northern cliff of the Acropolis. Many authorities hold that the original prytaneion of the city must have been on the Acropolis. From Aristotle's Constitution of Athens we know that the prytaneion was the official residence of the Archons but, when the New Agora was constructed by Pisistratus, they took their meals in the Thesmotheteion for the sake of convenience. Geoffrey Schmalz suggested in 2006 that the prytaneion should be identified with some of the ruins in St. Catherine's Square, not far from the Lysikrates Monument. Following the unearthing of an inscription mentioning the Prytaneion, George Kavvadias and Angelos Matthaiou argued in 2014 that it was somewhat to the north and west of the location suggested by Schmalz.

Polemon of Athens said that copies of the laws of Solon were kept in the prytaneion, engraved on square wooden tablets which revolved on pivots in such a way that when the tablets were turned at an angle they seemed to be triangular. Pausanias says briefly that the laws of Solon were inscribed in the prytaneion.

There was also a court of justice called the court of the prytaneion; all that is known of this court is that it tried murderers who could not be found, and inanimate objects which had caused death.

== Achaea ==
In Achaea, this central hall was called the lēïton or "people's house", and a similar building is known to have existed at Elis.

== Olympia ==
At Olympia, the Prytaneion was where the priests and magistrates lived; the high priests lived in the Theokoleon. It stands to the north-west of the Temple of Hera and was used for celebrations and feasts by the winners of the games. It also housed the Altar of Hestia where the original Olympic flame once burnt.

== Naucratis ==
Athenaeus, in the Deipnosophistae, writes that in Naucratis the people dined in the Prytaneion on the natal day of the Hestia Prytanitis (Ancient Greek: Ἑστίας Πρυτανίτιδος).

== Gallery ==
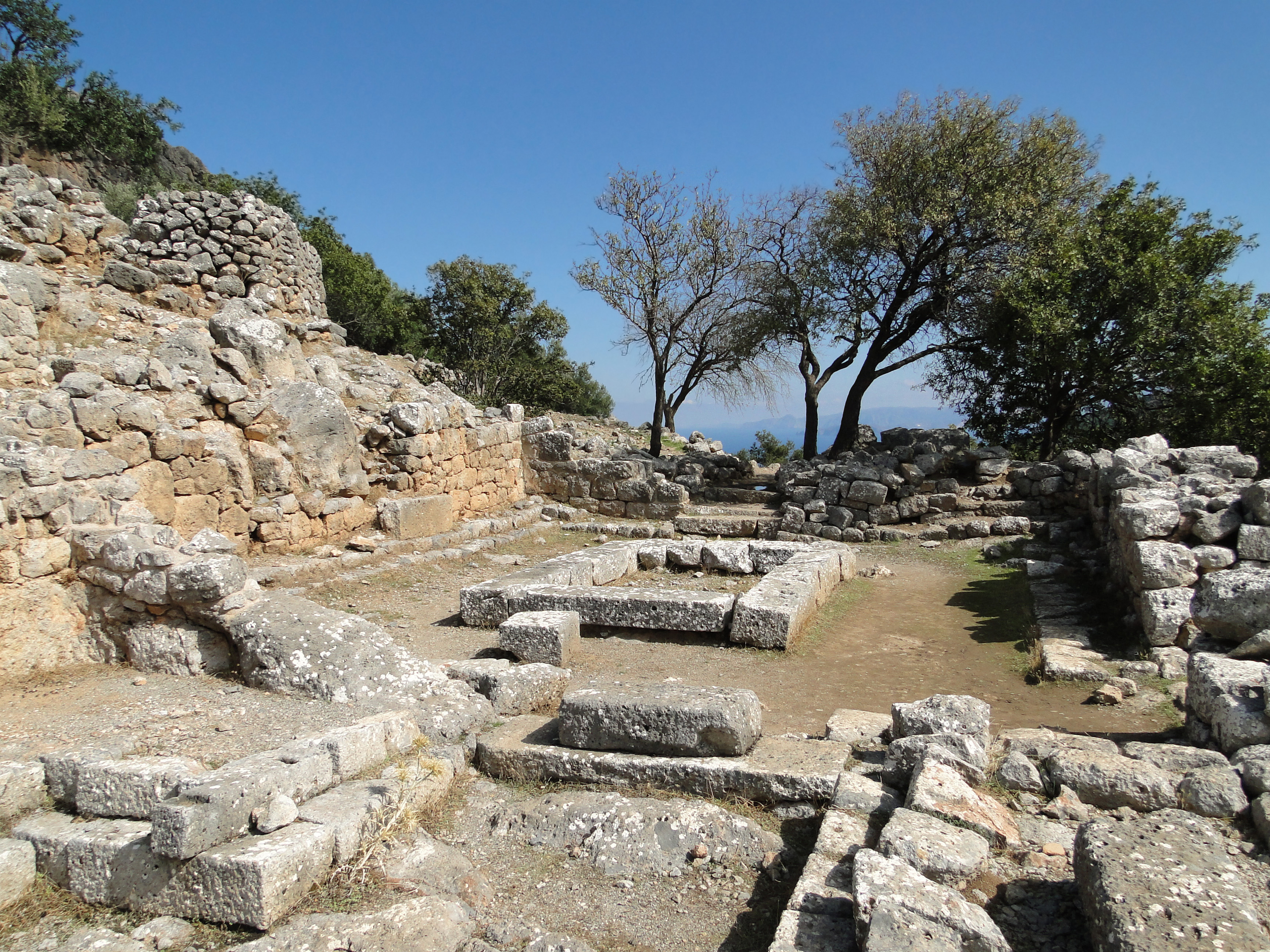
Lato

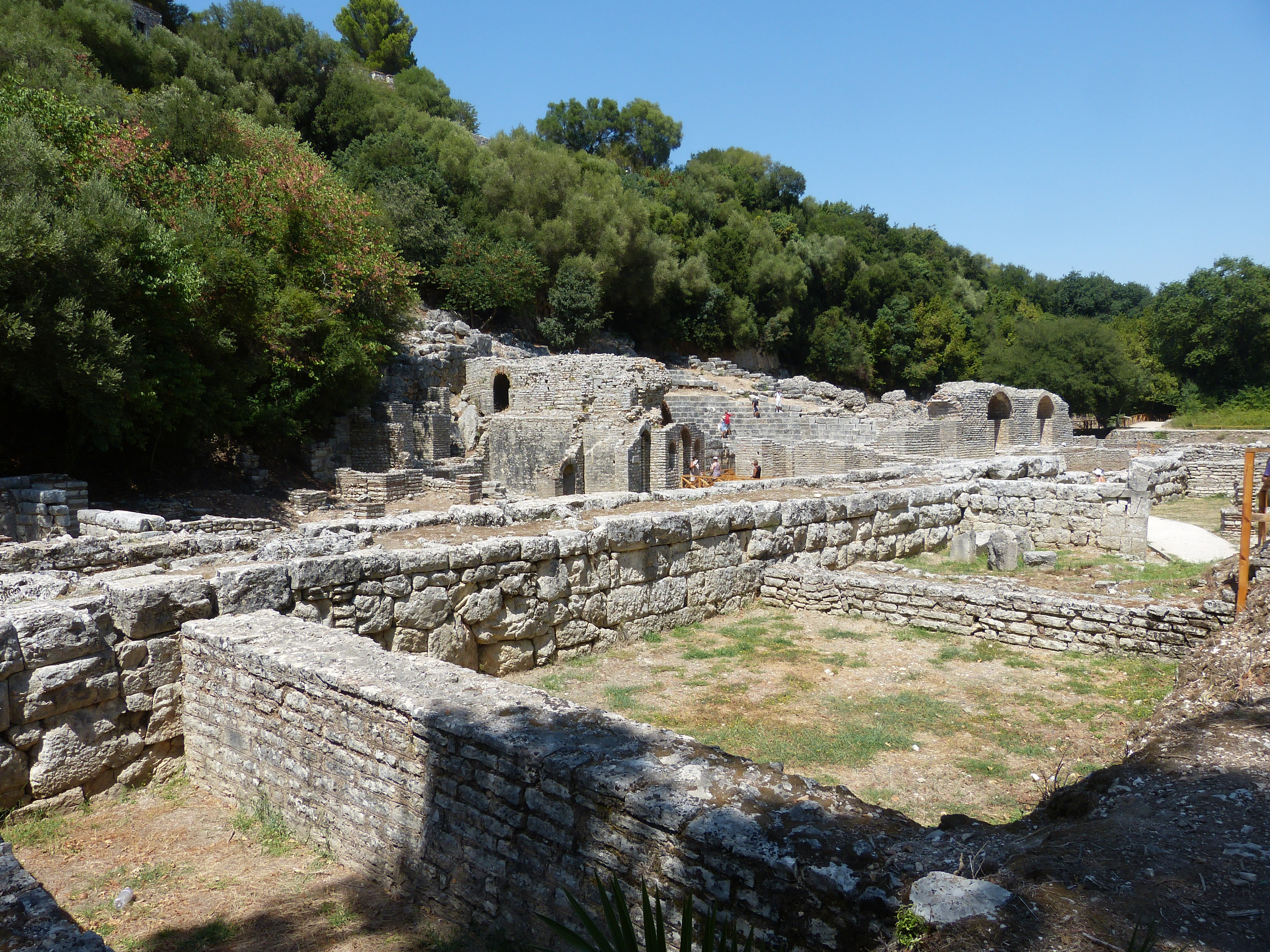
Butrint

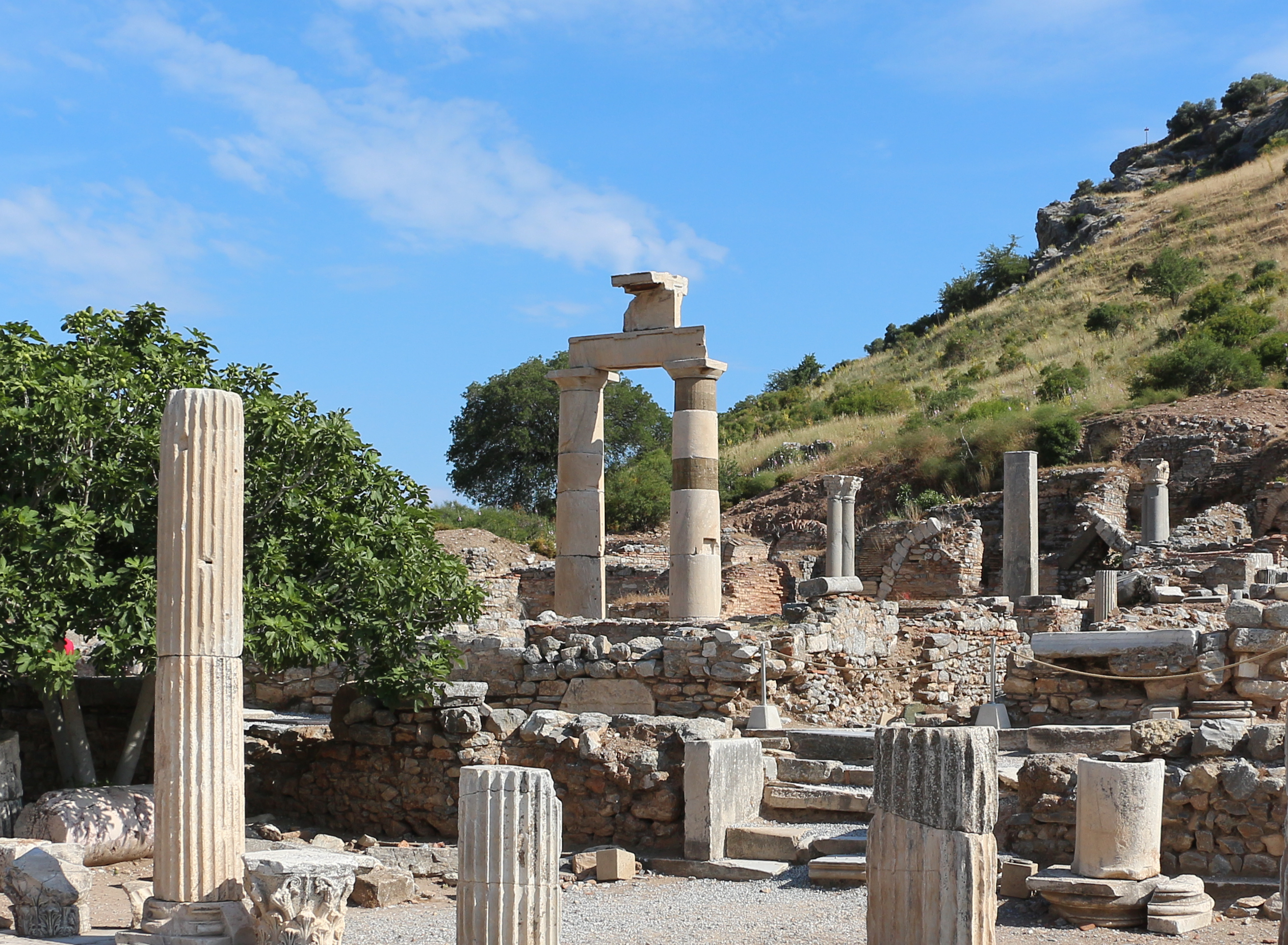
Ephesus

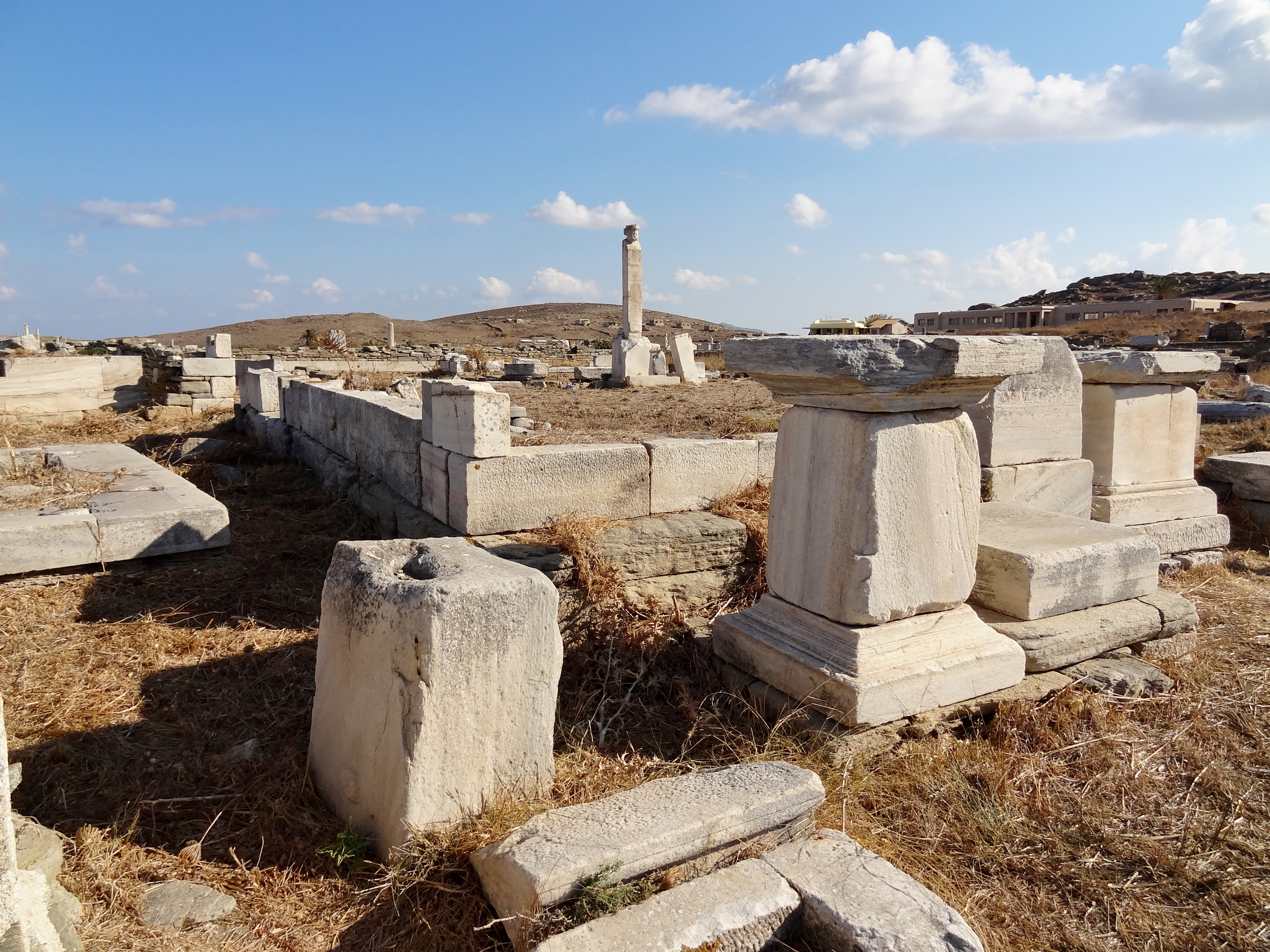
Delos

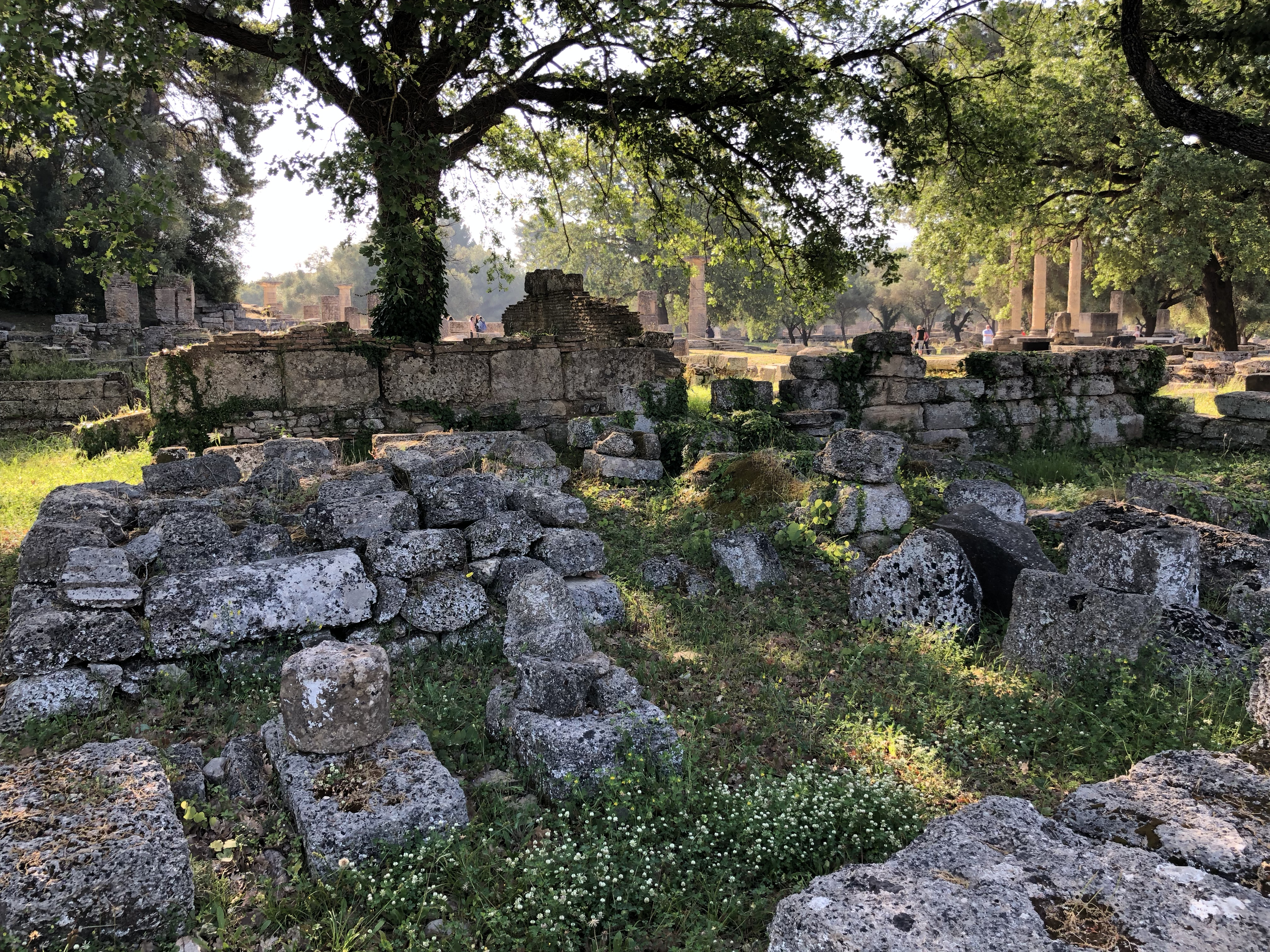
Olympia

== See also ==
- Prytanée

== Sources ==
- Miller, Stephen G. The Prytaneion. Its Function and Architectural Form. Berkeley: University of California Press, 1978.
