= Sacred fire of Vesta =

Eternal flame in ancient Rome

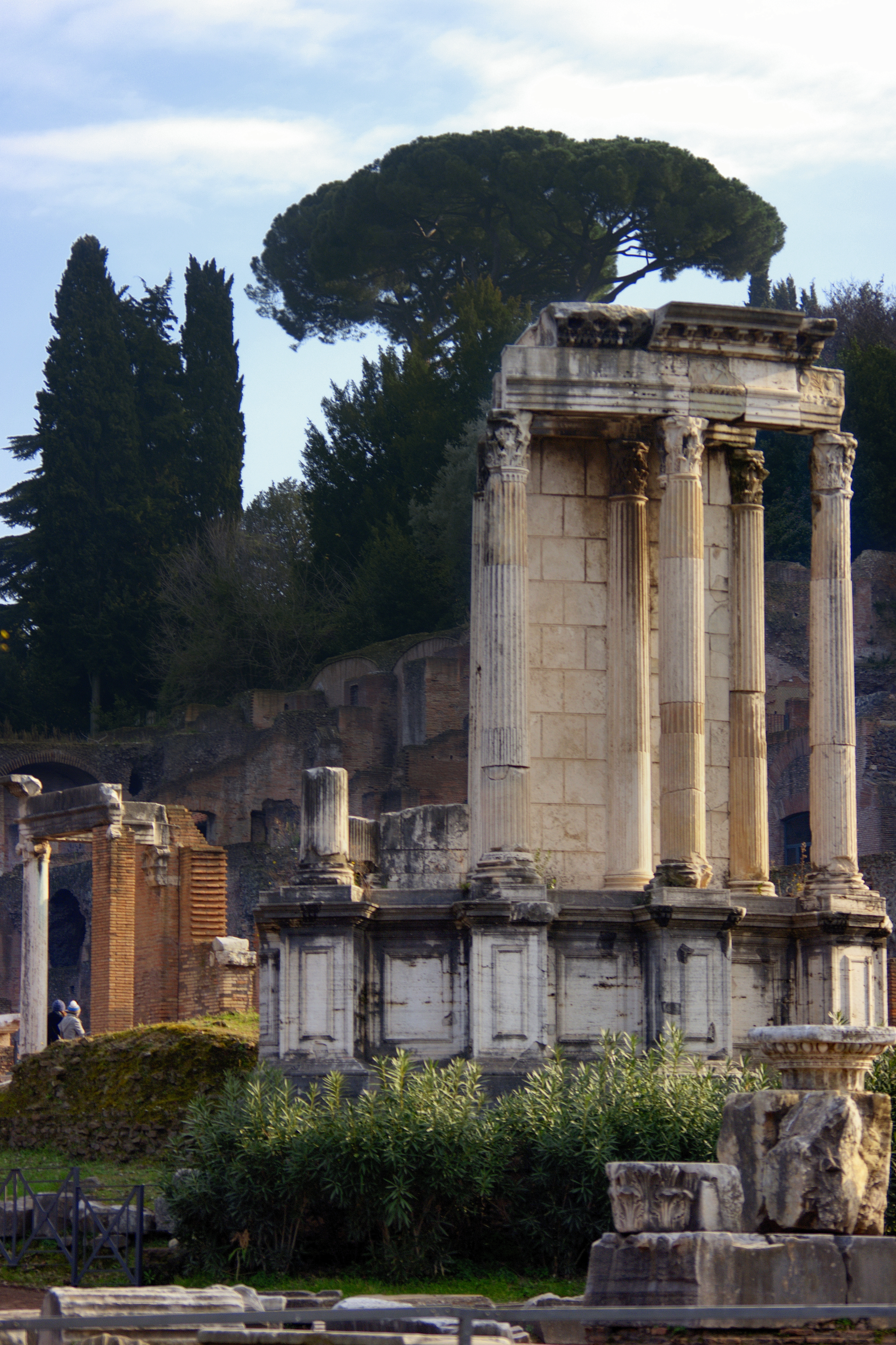
- Hearth at the Temple of Vesta

- Location within Rome
- 41.891742°N 12.486176°E
- Location: Regione VIII Forum Romanum

The sacred fire of Vesta was an eternal flame in ancient Rome dedicated to the goddess Vesta, protector of the hearth, home, and family.

The institution of the sacred fire was traditionally attributed to the legendary king Numa Pompilius in the 7th century BC.

== Location ==
The sacred fire burned in Vesta's circular temple, in the Roman Forum below the Palatine Hill in the pre-republican period. Among other sacred objects in the temple was the Palladium, a statue of Pallas Athena said to be brought by Aeneas from Troy. The temple was destroyed by fire on several occasions and rebuilt multiple times; its final reconstruction took place in AD 191 under the orders of Julia Domna, wife of the emperor Septimius Severus.

== Rituals ==
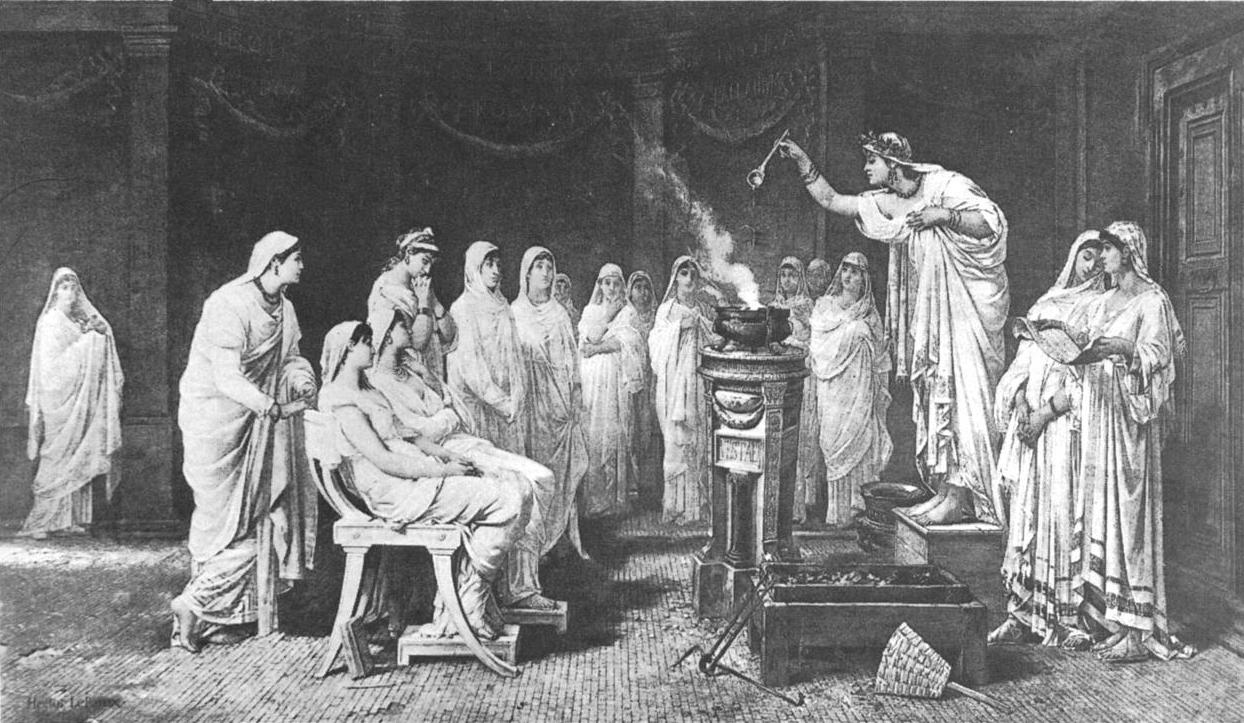
School of the Vestals, a painting by Hector Leroux, 1880

The fire was tended by the Vestal Virgins, a unique priesthood that began with two members, later increased to four, and eventually to six. Chosen by lot from patrician families, the Vestals served for thirty years, during which they ensured the flame never went out and performed rituals linked to domestic life. These included the ceremonial sweeping of the temple on June 15 and the preparation of sacred food for major festivals. As Vesta embodied the hearth, the flame symbolised both the life of every Roman household and the vitality of the state. Its eternal burning was believed to guarantee the goddess’s protection and the enduring strength of Rome itself.

=== Renewal ===
The fire was renewed every year on the Kalends of March. Plutarch's (c. 1st century AD) Parallel Lives records the Vestal Virgins’ use of burning mirrors to relight the fire:

If it (the fire) happens by any accident to be put out ... it is not to be lighted again from another fire, but new fire is to be gained by drawing a pure and unpolluted flame from the sunbeams. They kindle it generally with concave vessels of brass, formed by hollowing out an isosceles rectangular triangle, whose lines from the circumference meet in one single point. This being placed against the sun, causes its rays to converge in the centre, which, by reflection, acquiring the force and activity of fire, rarefy the air, and immediately kindle such light and dry matter as they think fit to apply. (tr. Langhorne 1821 1: 195)

Allowing the sacred fire to die out was regarded as a grave breach of duty; it implied that the goddess Vesta had withdrawn her protection from the city. Vestals guilty of this offence were punished by a scourging or a beating.

== The flame extinguished ==
The cult endured for over a millennium until it was formally suppressed during the Christianization of the empire. The Vestals were disbanded and the flame extinguished in the early 390s, likely in 394 CE, as part of edicts by Emperor Theodosius I against pagan worship.

In 410 CE, Rome was sacked by the Visigoths under Alaric I, marking the first time the city had fallen to a foreign invader in roughly 800 years. In the aftermath, pagan writers such as the later historian Zosimus argued that the abandonment of traditional state rites—including the extinguishing of the sacred flame—had dissolved the ''pax deorum'' ("peace with the gods") and left the empire vulnerable. This sentiment prompted contemporary Christian apologists, most notably Augustine of Hippo in ''The City of God'', to counter that the ancient gods had never guaranteed Rome's safety and that earlier pagan regimes had suffered comparable disasters. Modern historians view the sack not through these religious polemics, but as the result of long-term political instability, military restructuring, and diplomatic failures under Emperor Honorius.
