= Vestalia =

Roman festival honoring Vesta

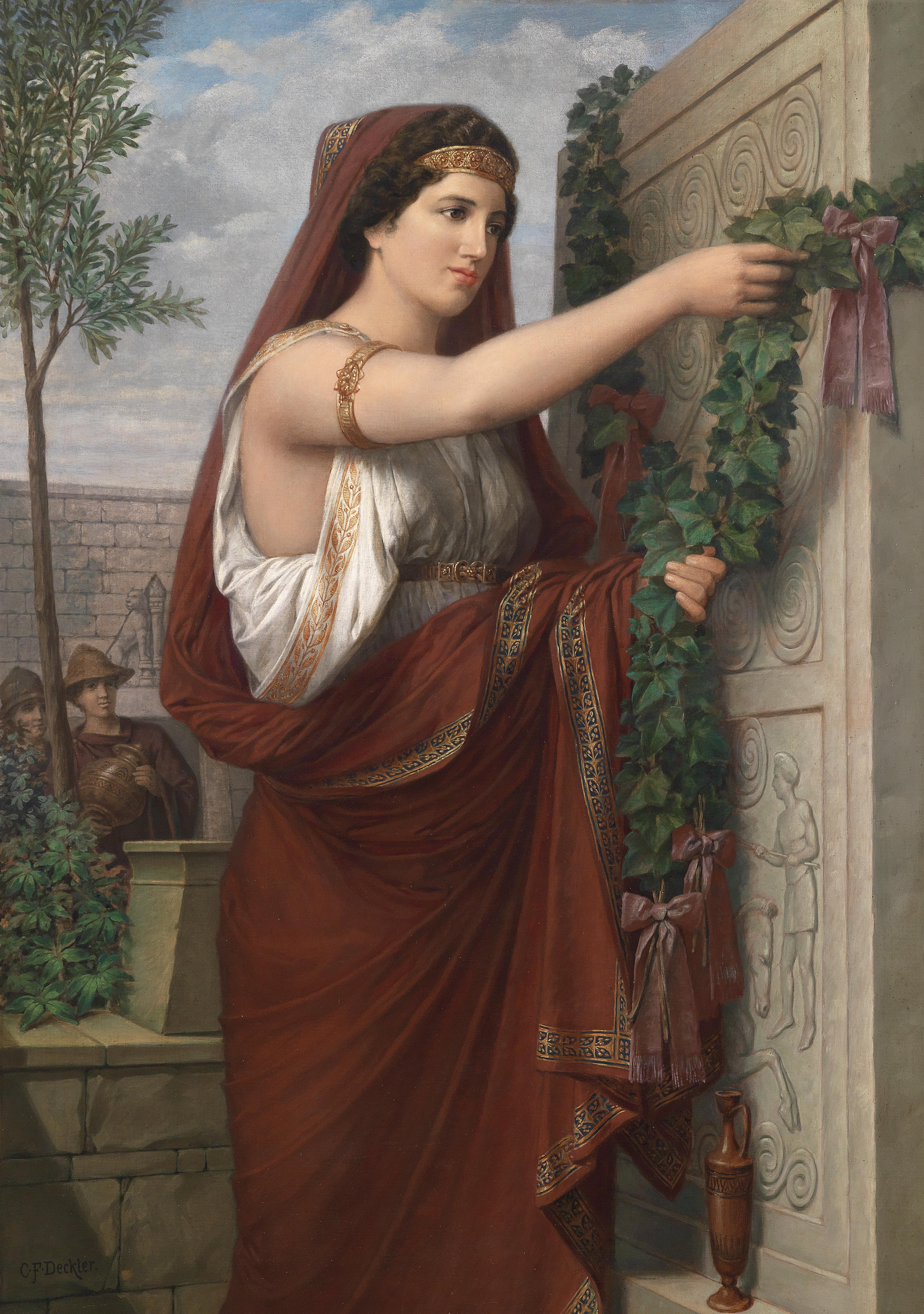
- Vestal virgin hanging an ivy wreath.
- Observed by: Romans
- Type: Classical Roman religion
- Date: June 7 – 15

Vestalia was a Roman religious festival in honor of Vesta, the goddess of the hearth and the burning continuation of the sacred fire of Rome. It was held from 7–15 June, and was reserved as a women's-only event.

Domestic and family life in general were represented by the festival of the goddess of the house and of the spirits of the storechamber — Vesta and the Penates — on Vestalia. On the first day of festivities the penus Vestae (sanctum sanctorum of the temple of Vesta which was usually curtained off) was opened, for the only time during the year, at which women offered sacrifices. As long as the curtain remained open, mothers could come, barefoot and disheveled, to leave offerings to the goddess in exchange for a blessing to them and their family.

The animal consecrated to Vesta, the donkey, was crowned with garlands of flowers and bits of bread on 9 June. Ovid says that donkeys were adorned with necklaces of bread-bits in memory of the myth where Vesta is nearly violated by Priapus. In that myth, it is the untimely bray of a donkey that startles Priapus and causes him to flee. Before that, he says donkeys were honored on 9 June in thanks for the services they provided in the bakeries.

The final day, 15 June, was Quando Stercum Delatum Fas ["once the dung has been removed, lawcourt business is permitted"]. The penus Vestae was solemnly closed, the Flaminica Dialis observed mourning, and the temple was subjected to a purification called stercoratio: the filth was swept from the temple and carried next by the route called clivus Capitolinus and then into the Tiber.

The military Feriale Duranum of AD 224 records the first day of Vestalia as Vesta apperit[ur] and the last day as Vesta cluditur.

== See also ==
- Roman festivals
- Carmentalia
- Floralia
- Cerealia
- Fornacalia
- Opiconsivia
- Divalia
- Furrinalia
- Matralia
- Lemuria (festival)
- Matronalia
- Liberalia
- Parilia
- Rosalia, a festival of roses celebrated throughout the Roman Empire
- May Queen
