= Domination (play-by-mail game) =

Play-by-mail game

- Publishers: LAMA
- Years active: ~1988 to unknown
- Genres: Role-playing
- Languages: English
- Players: 30
- Playing time: fixed
- Materials required: Instructions, order sheets, turn results, paper, pencil
- Media type: Play-by-mail

Domination is a play-by-mail game of conquest that was published by LAMA.

== Publication history ==
Domination is a closed-end play-by-mail game.

== Description ==
=== Setting ===
The post-apocalyptic game of Domination is set on an island continent, which has been divided into 150 regions. The emperor of the island has died, leaving the petty warlords of the island to vie for control.

=== Gameplay ===
Games start with 30 players, each controlling five regions of the island. The goal of the game is to conquer the other regions by recruiting villagers into an army, forming them into various forces (foot troops, archers, cavalry, ships, and security), and using them to both defend against attacks from other players, as well as attacking and either conquering or destroying neighbouring regions. Games usually take around 25 turns to complete. A major part of the game is controlling the commodities of food and durables, which each have different uses related to military units and regions. Reviewer Jim Townsend called economics "the most difficult part of the game".

=== Victory conditions ===
The winner is the player who either

- takes control of 75 regions while all other players control less than 50 regions each, or
- destroys all of their opponents.

== Reception ==
In the November–December 1990 issue of White Wolf (Issue 18), Kelly Golden noted some drawbacks to the game, but overall found the game was "enjoyable [...] fast paced and action is always guaranteed". In conclusion, Golden would "gladly play [it] again".

== See also ==
- List of play-by-mail games

== Bibliography ==
- Golden, Kelly (November–December 1990). "PBM Review: Domination". White Wolf Magazine. No. 18. p. 58.
- Piediscalzzi, Terry (January–February 1989). "The A, B,...Zs of Economics for Domination". Paper Mayhem. No. 34. pp. 34–37.
- Townsend, Jim (March–April 1988). "Domination!". Paper Mayhem. No. 29. pp. 6–7.
