= Archegetes =

Archegetes (Ancient Greek: Ἀρχηγέτης) is a Greek word that meant, effectively, "leader" or "founder". It could refer to a number of different things in classical antiquity.

== General ==
Primarily, it was a title for Greek gods and heroes that typically indicated one who was an originator or ancestor, especially of new colonies or settlements. This could be seen most commonly with Apollo, but sometimes also with Heracles and the heroes of the demes of Attica, and the Thracian horseman.

== Apollo ==
Archegetes was notably an epithet of the Greek god Apollo, under which he was worshipped in several places, as at Naxos in Sicily, where Archegetes was the most popular cult of Apollo, and at Megara. The name has reference either to Apollo as the leader and protector of colonies, or as the founder of towns in general, in which case the import of the name is nearly the same as Δεὸς πατρῷος. The altar of Apollo Archegetes at Naxos had particular importance as Naxos was the first Greek colony, founded in 734 BC. Though the altar was initially likely set up due to the maritime aspects of Apollo – most importantly the God of Happy Landing, έκβάσιος – the aspect of foundation, Archegetes, grew more important over time. As Archegetes was the aspect of Apollo relating to foundations and hence colonisation, the altar became a symbolic foundation and center of Sicilian Greek identity. Due to this symbolically central role, Greeks leaving Sicily would often visit the altar – Malkin describes it as a "ritualistic point of departure". Equally, it was a "symbol of arrival common to them all" when they came to Sicily. The pan-Sikeliote nature of Apollo Archegetes is also evident in Timoleon's use of the god as the symbol of his symmachia, or alliance.

The Apollo Archegetes at Naxos was Pythian, rather than Delian, with regard to its identity – it was connected to the similarly pan-Hellenic Delphic oracle.

Archegetes was also an epithet of the Greek god Asclepius, under which he was worshipped at Tithorea in Phocis.
