= Chrysame of Thessaly =

Thessalian priestess in Ancient Greece

In Ancient Greece, Chrysame (Ancient Greek: Χρυσάμη, romanized: Khrusámē) was a Thessalian priestess of the goddess Enodia. She is famous for using herbs to defeat the Ionians at Erythrae, granting Cnopus of Codridae victory in the battle. Thessaly was known for witchcraft, especially the usage of herbs. Thessalian witches were said to even be capable of drawing down the moon. Therefore, Chrysame’s usage of herbs is appropriate for a Thessalian priestess. Especially Enodia, who is the goddess of roads, protection, the city, cemeteries, and who was identified with Hecate.

== Chrysame's defeat of the Erythraians ==
According to Polyaenus, a conqueror named Cnopus of Codridae was fighting with the Ionians at Erythrai after the recent Ionian colonisation of Asia Minor. Cnopus received an oracle one day that stated:

στρατηγὸν παρὰ Θεσσαλῶν λαβεῖν τὴν ἱέρειαν τῆς Ἐνοδίας.

to take as general from the Thessalians, the priestess of Ennodia.

Therefore an embassy was sent to retrieve the priestess, due to the oracle.

Chrysame chose a large and beautiful bull, gilded his horns, then decorated him with garlands, and purple ribbons embroidered with gold. She mixed a medicinal herb that would excite madness into his food and ordered him to be kept in the stall and fed upon it.

The concoction would cause anyone to eat it to be seized with madness. Anyone who ate the flesh of the bull when it was in such a state would be seized by the same affliction. When the enemy encamped against her, she directed an altar to be raised in sight of them; and after every preparation for a sacrifice had been made, the bull was brought forth. Under the influence of the concoction, the bull broke loose. The bull ran wild into the plain with fury and attacked everything in his way. The Erythraians saw the bull running towards their camp and considered it a good omen. They seized the bull and offered him to their gods. All of the Erythraians ate a piece of the flesh. The whole army was soon afterwards seized with madness, and exhibited the same marks of wildness and frenzy the bull had done. When Chrysame saw this, she ordered Cnopus immediately to draw out his forces and charge the enemy. Incapable of making any defences, the Erythraians were cut to pieces, therefore defeated. Cnopus made himself master of Erythrae, which was a great and flourishing city.

== See also ==
- Enodia
- Ancient Thessaly
- Magic in the Greco-Roman world
