= Libitina =

Roman deity

Libitina, also Libentina or Lubentina, is an ancient Roman goddess of funerals and burial. Her name was used as a metonymy for death, and undertakers were known as libitinarii. Libitina was associated with Venus, and the name appears in some authors as an epithet of Venus.

The grove (lucus) of Libitina was located on the Esquiline Hill, as were several religious sites indicating that the area had "unhealthy and ill-omened" associations. A public cemetery was located outside the Esquiline Gate, in the Campus Esquilinus. A temple of Venus in the grove of Libitina celebrated its founding anniversary August 19, the day of the Vinalia Rustica. When a person died, the treasury of the temple collected a coin as a "death tax" supposed to have been established by Servius Tullius. During a plague in 65 AD, 30,000 deaths were recorded at the temple. Livy notes two occasions when the death toll exceeded Libitina's capacity. A panel (collegium) of funeral directors (dissignatores) was based in the grove of Libitina.

Libitina is sometimes regarded as Etruscan in origin. The name is perhaps derived from Etruscan lupu-, "to die." Varro, however, offers a Latin etymology from lubere, "to be pleasing," related to libido, that attempts to explain the goddess's connection to Venus. Venus Lubentina or Libitina may result from an identification with the Etruscan Alpanu (also as Alpan or Alpnu) who had characteristics of both a love goddess and an underworld deity. The Etruscan formula alpan turce is equivalent to libens dedit, "gave freely or willingly," in Latin.

== See also ==
- Enodia – Ancient Thessalian goddess
