= Enodia =

Ancient Thessalian goddess

- Goddess of Roads, Ghosts, Purification, Protection, the City, and Cemeteries
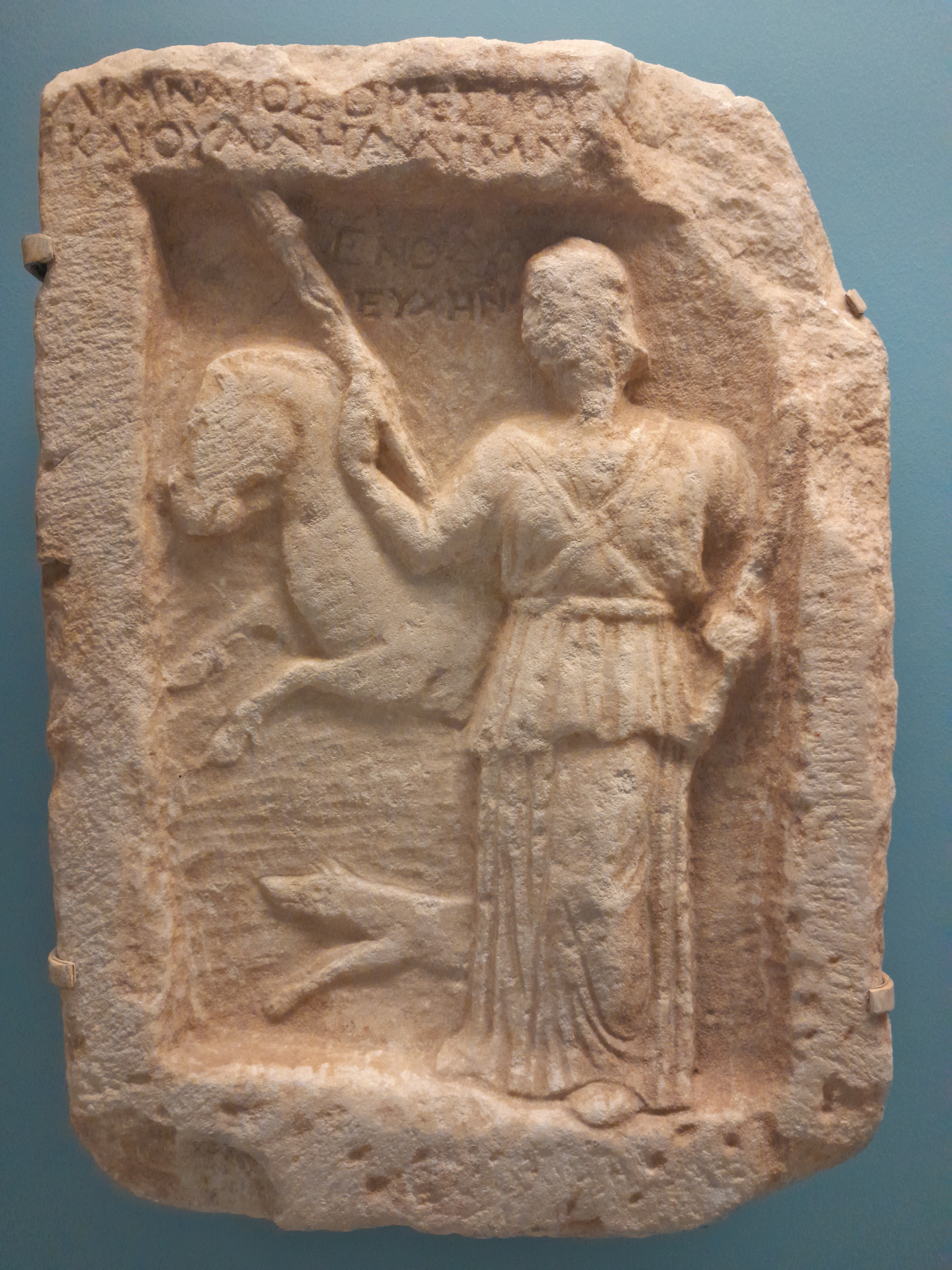
- Votive relief with Enodia from western Macedonia, Archaeological Museum of Kozani
- Abode: Pherae
- Animals: Dogs, Horses, and perhaps Bulls and Snakes
- Symbol: Torches and Iron Keys

In Ancient Greek religion and mythology, Enodia, also spelled Ennodia and Einodia (/ɛˈnoʊdi.ə/; Ancient Greek: Ἐννοδία, romanized: Ennodía, lit. 'the one in the streets, on the road') is a distinctly Thessalian goddess, identified in certain areas or by certain ancient writers with Artemis, Hecate or Persephone. She was paired with Zeus in cult and sometimes shared sanctuaries with him. Enodia was primarily worshipped in Ancient Thessaly and was well known in Hellenistic Macedonia.

Enodia is a goddess of roads, protection (apotropaic), ghosts, purification, the city, and cemeteries. She was included in the local dodekotheon. The goddesses of this dodekotheon were Hestia, Demeter, Enodia, Aphrodite, Athena and Themis.

The name ‘Enodia’ suggests that she watched over entrances and that she stood on the main road into a city, keeping an eye on those who entered, and in the road in front of private homes, protecting the inhabitants that dwelled within. Divinities with this Apotropaic function were expected to keep away dangers such as burglars, malicious spirits, and even pestilence such as mice. Other notable divinites with this function are Hecate, Hermes, and Apollo.

Enodia’s main cult location, especially before the 5th century, was the city of Pherai. Pherai was an important city to Ancient Thessaly, due to the location of the settlement.

There are only two attested priests of Enodia. Timarete of Corinth, who died in Pella, Macedonia, in the late 5th century BC and Chrysame. According to Polyaenus, Cnopus of Codridae was fighting with the Ionians at Erythrai after the recent Ionian colonisation of Asia Minor. Cnopus received an oracle that stated: “to take as general from the Thessalians, the priestess of Ennodia” (στρατηγὸν παρὰ Θεσσαλῶν λαβεῖν τὴν ἱέρειαν τῆς Ἐνοδίας). Chrysame, the priestess mentioned arrived and through her mastery of herbs, poisoned the Erythraians. Due to this, Cnopus led his army to victory. Thessaly was stereotyped as being full of witches that could even draw down the moon, so the association of Chrysame with herbs makes sense.

== Iconography ==
Enodia was sometimes depicted upon coins in Thessaly. She is shown as a young woman, typically riding a horse and carrying torches. A stele dated between the 1st and 2nd century depicts Enodia wearing a chiton poderes, which is cross-girdled under the chest. This stele also depicts her on horseback and accompanied by a dog.

== Origins and civic expansion of Enodia's cult ==
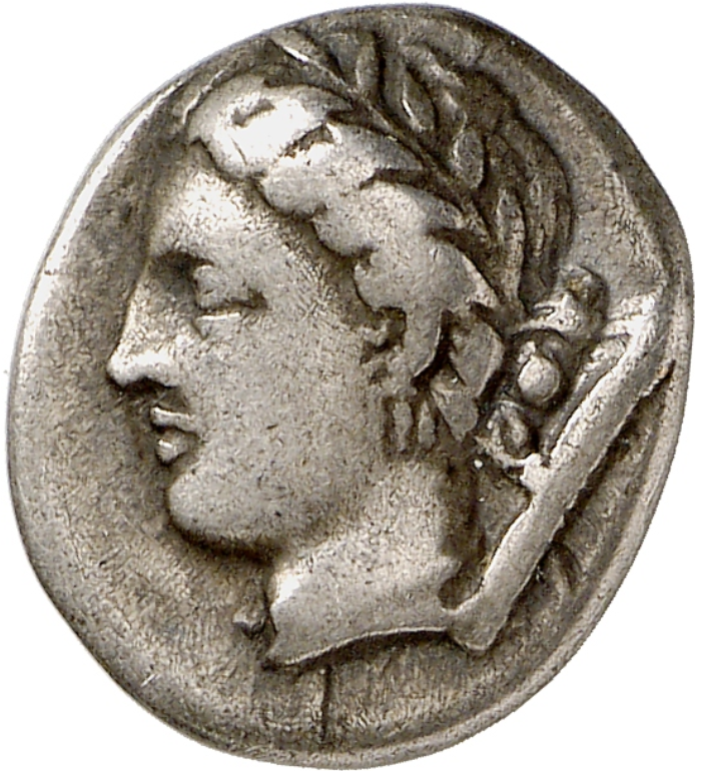
Ancient Greek silver hemidrachm from Pherae with the head of Enodia, c. 302-286 BC, Altes Museum in Berlin.

Before the 5th Century, Enodia's worship was mostly confined to the city of Pherai. Though her epigraphical evidence is first found within the city of Larisa. Pherai was an important city in Ancient Thessaly from the Iron Age, which allowed Enodia to become a Pan-Thessalian goddess. During the 5th century Enodia's cult rapidly expanded through Thessaly, Southern Macedonia, and even expanded into Thrace. According to Polyaenus’ Strategemata, Enodia was supposedly a national deity during the Ionian migration.

The expansion of Enodia's cult is linked to the push for a Thessalian civil identity. The Cults of Pythian Apollo and Enodia were expanded and pushed throughout Thessaly. Yet, there was a fundamental difference between regionalizing the panhellenic Apollo and parochialising a local, regional goddess such as Enodia. She came to be worshipped throughout Thessaly and Macedonia, especially in the Hellenistic and Roman eras.

The usage of Enodia for the new Thessalian civil identity failed, as she was unsuitable divinity for the new Thessalian identity would be constructed when Flamininus refounded the league in 196. She is completely absent from Thessalian coins from the post-Flamininan era. Decrees of the new League were not published in a sanctuary of Enodia; whether at Pherai or elsewhere in Thessaly. There is no evidence of possible investment in any of her sanctuaries and no month of the Thessalian calendar in use after 196 appears to recognise and honour the goddess.

== Mythology ==
One myth of Enodia further connects her with the city of Pherai. As a baby, the goddess Enodia was brought to Pherai at the time of Pheres; which was when the city was in its infancy. She had been found by Pheres’ shepherds. In a way, she had grown up with the city. No other Thessalian city had claimed such a close connection to a single divinity like Pherai did, in a way making Enodia the city’s patron or special divinity.

== Ancient worship ==
Enodia was worshipped throughout Thessaly, Macedonia, and parts of Thrace. She shared sanctuaries with Zeus and was paired with him in cult. In their shared cult, Zeus was often given the epithet Thaulios. Enodia is possibly the most distinct and best understood of the deities worshipped in Thessaly and her cult was spread from the late fifth and fourth centuries onwards into surrounding regions; Macedonia in particular. In the fourth century, she was a part of the local dodekotheon. The goddesses of this local dodekotheon were Hestia, Demeter, Enodia, Aphrodite, Athena and Themis.

Enodia is also a kourotrophos (i.e. a protector and nurturer of children). An iron key was found inside of a drilled hole of a small base that bears an inscription asking Enodia for help with a child. It suggests that the base was originally placed near something that the key was able to lock and unlock, either literally or symbolically. Another inscription found on a similar base in Larisa asks Enodia for help with a child. These are similar to the hekatia that were placed at entrances. It is unknown if Enodia had this trait originally, or if this arose due to identification with Hecate.

Enodia's chthonic aspects are strongest with her dominion over cemeteries. Her worship often took place or near at cemeteries, such as the sanctuary of Zeus and Enodia in Pherai. Pieces possibly displaced from local tombs were dedicated later to Enodia in the eighth or seventh centuries. Votives consisted mainly of small bronze and iron objects such as jewellery of all kinds but mainly fibulae, bird and animal figurines. The animal figurines feature a wide range of species such as dogs, horses, and possibly bulls and snakes. Fragments from the Archaic sculptural record includes a bull's head. These are sacred to Enodia as and to underworld deities, notably Hecate. There is also the addition of mostly female terracottas from the seventh century onwards. Fibulae were popular votive offerings to the Goddess (which form nearly half of the existent votive records) with their ritual use to fix funerary clothing in Thessalian graves. Fibulae were generally preferred to pins throughout Ancient Thessaly.

The popularity of fibulae votives at the shrine of Enodia suggests that mortuary imagery may have been relevant to the cult. Though the chthonic aspects of the cult should not be overemphasised, as Enodia was also worshipped in a distinctly non-chthonic way; as an Olympian.

She is also a civic goddess. One of Enodia's shrines was placed against the edge of a city, suggesting that she has an interest in civic life. She was also grouped within the Patrooi Theoi, a group of gods in Thessaly of kinship and groups. The other gods in this group with Zeus Thaulios were Enodia, Athena, the Moirai, and Poseidon.

Despite her identification with Hecate or Artemis, Enodia stood on her own as a separate, popular goddess throughout the Hellenistic and Roman eras. In Theocritus’ Idyll II, Hermes Enodia (Hermes with the Epithet Enodia) is mentioned. It refers to a statue of the god at the entrance to an estate.

Epithets of Enodia

- Alexeatis (Greek: Ἀλέξεατις) an Apotropaic epithet, meaning ‘Averter of Evil’. It is mentioned in a 5th c. inscription to Enodia Alexeatis in the city of Larisa.
- Astike (Greek: Αστική) ‘of the City’ in Larisa
- Koroutarra (Greek: Κορουταρρα) ‘which makes one grow’ an unclear epithet that demonstrates a connection with the ancient feminine world[the what?] or as a provider of food and growth.
- Korillos (Greek: Κοριλλος) another unclear epithet that demonstrates a connection with the ancient feminine world [the what?].
- Osia (Greek: Οσια) is a peculiar epithet of Enodia found within Macedonia that may have a connection to purifications.
- Patroa (Greek: Πατρωα) An epithet meaning ‘ancestral’ or ‘paternal’ attested in a classical votive stone stele beneath Demetrias. Enodia belonged to the group of Patrooi Theoi, a group of gods in Thessaly of kinship and groups.
- Pheraia (Greek: Φεραίᾳ) ‘Of / belonging to / associated with Pherai’. This epithet arose due to Enodia's close connection to the city of Pherai.
- Strogike (Greek: Στρογικά) “of lightning", in the sense of a bringer of light. The epithet is invoked with her other epithet patroa at Larisa.
- Stathmia (Greek: Σταθμια) an epithet that may be connected to the animal realm due to one of the word stathmos many meanings being stable.
- Wastika (Greek: Ϝαστικᾶι) an epithet possibly referring to an urban aspect of Enodia, or Enodia of the community of Larisa.

== Identification with Hecate ==
Due to the similarities between the two goddesses, such as protecting roads, shared animals, averting evil, etc., it is no surprise that Enodia was identified with Hecate. Due to this, Lucian describes the rites of Hecate at Aigina as being the ‘rites of Enodia’. Pausanias in the Description Of Greece describes Hecate-Enodia receiving a sacrifice of a black puppy at night by the Spartans. This is a typical offering for Hecate, as black dogs are sacred to her.

The identification between Hecate and Enodia dates back to at least the fifth century. By the time of the fourth century, Hecate-Enodia is closely tied with ghosts in On the Sacred Disease, a text that seeks to shame magicians. The text describes multiple ‘Sacred Diseases’ that are said to be caused by the gods, according to the magicians.

If he shrieks loudly they compare him to a horse and say that Poseidon is responsible. 35. If a patient makes his stool, as often happens to those under the compulsion of disease, the god is named as Enodia. 36. If the stools come frequently and are rather thin, as in the case of birds, Apollo Nomios is responsible. 37. If he has foam coming out of his mouth and he kicks out with his feet, Ares gets the blame. 38. If the patient is attended by fears, terrors, and madnesses in the night, jumps up out his bed and flees outside, they call these the attacks of Hecate or the onslaughts of ghosts [hêrôes].

— On the Sacred Disease

Hecate Enodia refers to Hecate's role at crossroads as Trioditis and as Trivia (who is another goddess identified with Hecate) in the Roman Era.

== See also ==
- Libitina – Roman deity
- Hecate – Greek goddess of magic and transitions
- Thessaly
- Artemis
- Zeus
- Chrysame of Thessaly
