= Roman funerary practices =

Care of the dead in ancient Rome

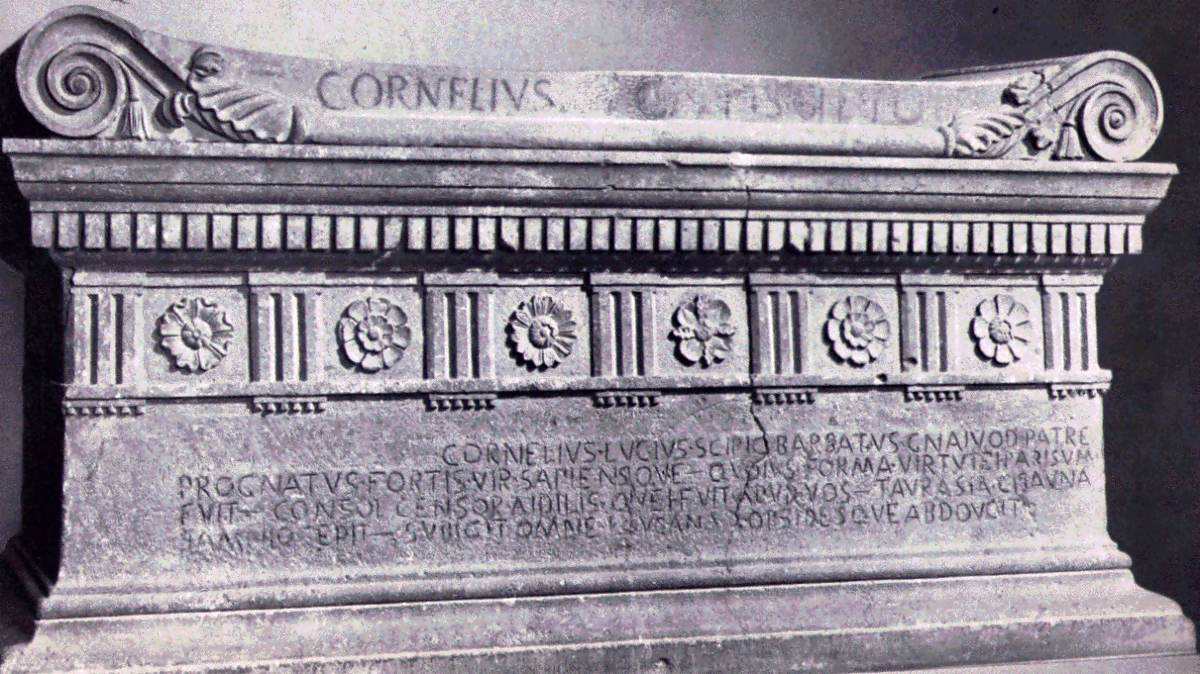
Sarcophagus of Lucius Cornelius Scipio Barbatus, 3rd century BC

Roman funerary practices include the Ancient Romans' religious rituals concerning funerals, cremations, and burials. They were part of time-hallowed tradition (Latin: mos maiorum), the unwritten code from which Romans derived their social norms. (Note: Literally, the "way of the greater ones" but understood as "the way of the ancestors".) Elite funeral rites, especially processions and public eulogies, gave the family an opportunity to publicly celebrate the life and deeds of the deceased, their ancestors, and the family's standing in the community. Sometimes the political elite gave costly public feasts, games and popular entertainments after family funerals, to honour the departed and to maintain their own public profile and reputation for generosity. The Roman gladiator games began as funeral gifts for the deceased in high-status families.

Funeral displays and expenses were supposedly constrained by sumptuary laws, designed to reduce class envy and consequent social conflict. The less well-off, and those who lacked the support of an extended family could subscribe to guilds or collegia which provided funeral services for members. Until their funeral and disposal, the dead presented a risk of ritual pollution. This was managed through funerary rituals which separated them from the world of the living, and consigned their spirit to the underworld. Professional undertakers were available to organise the funeral, manage the rites and dispose of the body. Even the simplest funerals of Rome's citizen and free majority could be very costly, relative to income. The poorest, and certain categories of criminal, could be dumped in pits or rivers, or left to rot in the open air. During plagues and pandemics, the system might be completely overwhelmed. Those who met an untimely or premature death, or died without benefit of funeral rites were believed to haunt the living as vagrant, restless spirits until they could be exorcised.

In Rome's earliest history, both inhumation and cremation were in common use among all classes. Around the mid-Republic inhumation was almost exclusively replaced by cremation, with some notable exceptions, and remained the most common funerary practice until the middle of the Empire, when it was almost entirely replaced by inhumation. Possible reasons for these widespread changes are the subject of scholarly speculation. During the early Imperial era, the funeral needs of the poor were at least partly met by the provision of ash-tombs with multiple niches, known as columbaria ("dovecote" tombs). During the later Empire, and particularly in the early Christian era, Rome's catacombs performed a similar function as repositories for inhumation burials.

By ancient tradition, cemeteries were located outside the ritual boundaries (pomerium) of towns and cities. Grand monuments and humble tombs alike lined the roadsides, sometimes clustered together like "cities of the dead". Tombs were visited regularly by living relatives with offerings to the deceased of food and wine, and special observances during particular Roman festivals and anniversaries; with correct funerary observances and continuity of care from one generation to the next, the shades of departed generations were believed to remain well disposed towards their living descendants. Families who could afford it spent lavishly on tombs and memorials. A Roman sarcophagus could be an elaborately crafted artwork, decorated with relief sculpture depicting a scene that was allegorical, mythological, or historical, or a scene from everyday life. Some tombs are very well preserved, and their imagery and inscriptions are an important source of information for individuals, families and significant events.

== Care of the dead ==
In Greco-Roman antiquity, the bodies of the dead were regarded as polluting. At the same time, loving duty toward one's ancestors (pietas) was a fundamental part of ancient Roman culture. The care of the dead negotiated these two emotionally opposed attitudes. When properly honoured with funeral rites and memorials by the living, the spirits of the dead were thought to become benevolent ancestors and protect their descendants. Those who died "before their natural term" or without proper funeral rites were thought to wander the earth, and haunt the living as vengeful, vagrant ghosts (Lemures). In Horace's Ode 1.28, the shade of a drowned, unburied sailor, trapped through no fault of his own between the worlds of the living and the dead, implores a passer-by to "sprinkle dust three times" on his corpse and give him rest, or suffer his revenge. Cicero (Laws 2.22.57) writes that "... until turf is cast upon the bones, the place where the body is cremated does not have a sacred character...." The ritualistic casting of earth or placing of turf on the cremated bones might have been the minimum requirement to make a grave a locus religiosus (a religious place, therefore protected by the gods). Burial rites, and burial itself, could be denied to certain categories of criminal after execution, a demonstration that through this simple omission, the power of the state could extend to the perpetual condemnation of souls.

Rome had a high population, and disposal of the dead was an essential, practical and often urgent obligation for relatives, and for civic and religious authorities. Erker (2011) proposes that this had little connection with modern notions of public health and pollution, as the measure of "death-pollution in Roman burials varied according to the social status of the deceased." In cities and towns, the corpses of slaves and other impoverished persons were sometimes illegally dumped in the street under cover of darkness to evade the cost of their proper disposal. They were removed by contracted undertakers and disposed without ceremony, virtually as soon as found. The cleansing rituals prescribed for members of the elite minority, who might lie "in state" for several days prior to disposal, were complex, detailed, and sensitive to error. The nobility were thought responsible, above all others and even in death, for sustaining Rome's traditional identity, purity, and divine approval. Bodel describes the dumping of low-status corpses on the streets as public nuisances, listed by Roman authorities as civil offences, on a par with the dumping of dung and unwanted animal products, and public brawling, all of which were dealt with by fining perpetrators in the civil courts, not by the ritual cleansing that would have been consequent on religious pollution.

=== Mortality ===
John Bodel calculates an annual death rate of 30,000 among a population of about 750,000 in the city of Rome, not counting victims of plague and pandemic. At birth, Romans of all classes had an approximate life expectancy of 20–30 years: men and women of citizen class who reached maturity could expect to live until their late 50's or much longer, barring illness, disease and accident. Married women, expected to bear children as a duty to family and state, were at particular risk of mortality through childbirth - 25 maternal deaths per 1,000 births (including still-births) is suggested. The death rate among newborns and young children was very high – around 1 in 4 births, or at worst, up to 50% mortality before age 5. Dietary deficiencies hindered growth and immunity among the poor, whether slave or free. The law prescribed the killing of any newborn by its father, if it was patently "unfit to live". Those less severely deformed, or of doubtful paternity, or born to impoverished or enslaved parents, or simply unwanted, might be exposed "for the gods to take care of". Exposure did not change their status, but if they were freeborn their father automatically lost his legal power over them, having surrendered it through abandonment. The status of an abandoned infant would have been difficult to prove. Some were adopted as foundlings, or sold and subsequently enslaved but many died. Attitudes to this practise varied; it was eventually outlawed, but covertly continued.

=== Funeral obligations of the familia ===
==== Adults ====
If the deceased had family, the paterfamilias (head of the family) usually paid for, arranged and led the funeral. If the deceased was also the paterfamilias, the cost fell to the heir or heirs of the estate, to be paid from their inheritance; as Cicero put it, the duty went with the money. If the deceased was a married woman, the cost should be paid by her husband, or from her dowry if she had been emancipated from her father. A slave who died as a loyal member of a familia might receive a decent funeral, and housing in the familia mausoleum, tomb or columbaria (shared "dovecote" style mausoleum). They might also be memorialised by an inscription, and be remembered in the family's annual commemorative rites. A freedman or woman who died as a client might be buried and commemorated as a lesser member of their patron's family, at their patron's expense.

==== Children, infants and babies ====
Families were under no customary or religious duty to give funeral rites to new-borns. Until they had been named and acknowledged by their father on their dies lustricus (name-day), the 8th after birth for a girl, the 9th for a boy, new-borns were ritually pure, with only the most rudimentary personhood in law. Their death polluted no-one, and their spirit could not become a malevolent, earthbound shade; they therefore needed no purificatory funeral rites. Those who died while less than 4 days old could be buried almost anywhere; unlike nearly all others, they could be interred within the pomerium (the city or town's ritual boundary), often within houses, or "under the eaves" (suggrundarium) of their birth-family's home. According to Greek and Roman literary commentators, children only acquired full humanity by degrees, with careful teaching and discipline; their ritual purity lasted, at some level, until the onset of adolescence – signalled by a boy's first beard, and a girl's menarche. Plutarch, who claimed a Stoic attitude to the death of his infant daughter, held that until the withering and removal of the umbilical cord a week after birth, the newborn was "more like a plant than an animal"; if it died at birth, sadness at its lost potential was entirely natural but mourning should be restrained.

=== Responsibility of the State ===
Cicero describes the provision of a funeral and rites as a "natural duty", consistent with universal notions of human care and decency. Those who had rendered special service to the people or the state, in their military or civil career or as an ally, might be voted a funeral at state expense (a funus publicum). Sometimes the honour would be noted and publicly acknowledged by the heir, but the payment of costs refused, as a mark of the family's continued generosity to the people and state. The state intervened in several public and private aspects of burial and funeral practice. For certain deceased with a very high public profile, the entire population was expected to go into official mourning over a fixed period (and no longer than that). Sumptuary laws, designed to restrain expenditure and conspicuous display of wealth, privilege and excessive emotion, were often ignored or circumvented by the elite. "Excessive" mourning displays – of too great an intensity, cost or duration – were officially frowned on, as was the use of timbers "finished with the axe" for funeral pyres. The sprinkling of wine on the ashes of the deceased had been banned as extravagant and practised as essential for time immemorial.

At the other extreme, some individuals might attempt to lawfully escape the burden and expense of a funeral obligation, through the courts, or unlawfully avoid even the most basic disposal costs for a dead relative or slave, and risk a fine by simply dumping the body in the street. Bodel (2000) calculates that around 1,500 abandoned and unwanted corpses, not counting victims of epidemics, had to be removed from the streets of Rome every year. Responsibility for their removal and disposal fell to government-contracted undertakers and their servants or slaves, working on behalf of the aediles, the magistrates who oversaw the maintenance of temples, shrines, public buildings, and the streets. Cassius Dio claims that 2,000 died in Rome every day in the plague outbreak of AD 189; and Suetonius, that in one autumn of Nero's reign, 30,000 in Rome died of plague. It is not known how undertakers or aediles dealt with such numbers of dead.

== Undertakers ==
Undertakers (dissignatores, or libitinarii) supplied a broad range of funeral and disposal services, considered demeaning or ritually unclean to most citizens; these included digging graves, building pyres, moving and dressing corpses, applying cosmetics to the deceased to disguise the pallor of death, and organising the procession and cremation or burial; each of these tasks was a speciality within the profession. Specialist undertakers could be hired to torture, flog or crucify slaves, to perform executions, and to carry or drag corpses from their place of execution to a place of disposal. In the town of Puteoli, circa. 100–50 BC, the undertaker also functioned as the town executioner. He and his 32 permanent staff lived outside the municipal boundary, and could only enter the town to carry out their trades, charged at a given rate-per-mile, plus hire or purchase of necessary equipment and services. Funerals of decurions (local magistrates, members of the town's senate) were marked out as the most urgent, followed by funerals of the young who had died prematurely; their deaths, though not a public concern, were considered the most grievous. Certain services had to be provided without additional payment, in a timely manner, and in a specific order of priority. Any slave's corpse left on the street must be removed "within two hours of daylight" without mourning or funeral rites, and the slave's owner, if detected, must pay a 60 sestertii fine to the municipality. The corpses of suicides by hanging, deemed particularly offensive to the gods, must be removed within the hour of discovery, again without mourning or funeral rites. Not every city had professional undertakers on its public payroll; but many did, and Puteoli's arrangements and practices are assumed to broadly reflect those in Rome. There were differences in regulation from place to place; for example, Martial describes the night-time use of tattooed workmen as corpse carriers in Rome; in Puteoli, they were specifically excluded.

=== Undertakers on the Esquiline ===
The likely headquarters for the City of Rome's official undertakers was on the Esquiline Hill, where a temple in Libitina's sacred grove had been dedicated to Venus Libitina, as a patron goddess of funerals and undertakers, "hardly later than 300 BC". Venus's attested presence on the Esquiline seems to underline a very Roman association between sex, passion and death. Libitina herself appears to have had no independent cult, shrine or worshipers; her name is the likely source for the usual title of undertakers, "Libitinarii", but it also appears to have been metonymy for virtually all that pertained to undertakers and funerals, including biers ("couches of Libitina") and death itself. The Esquiline contained squared pits, named in the 1st century BC as puticuli ("little pits"), possible remnants of ancient stone-quarrying that sometimes served as dumps for corpses of the destitute, animal bones and household litter. The hill had once been the site of an ancient, aristocratic necropolis, first used around the 9th century BC, then submerged by the city's growth. Despite this ancient usage, the Esquilline seems not to have been a locus religiosus, but a locus publicus - an ordinary, public place, though notoriously unpleasant and malodorous. Towards the end of the Republic an area just outside the Esquiline Gate was used as a dump for the bodies of executed criminals and crucified slaves. The former were simply left there, or "dragged with the hook" from elsewhere by the undertaker's distinctively red-clad employees for disposal by birds and beasts. The bodies of slaves were usually left to rot on their crosses. The upper echelons of libitinarii (dissignatores, who hosted, organised and led funeral rites) wore distinctive black clothing, including a black hat. They were considered less polluted, and less polluting, than those who came into direct contact with corpses. Despite the public announcement of public executions, and public attendance at the same, the mere sight of a red-clad corpse-carrier or the body he dragged or carried was thought a pollution to be avoided, especially by priests, in particular by priests of Jupiter. Corpse-carriers going about their business were therefore obliged to ring a bell to warn of their approach.

A fee was payable for death certification at the offices of the Esquilline undertakers – a sort of "death tax". It funded the state's contribution to several festivals, including elements of the Parentalia and sacred games such as the Ludi Apollinares and Ludi Plebeii. The profession of undertaker was simultaneously "purifying and inherently sordid"; a necessary and ignoble trade, whose practitioners profited from blood and death. For contractors, it was almost certainly very profitable.

== Burial societies and burial grants ==
Burial societies were among the very few privately funded and privately organised associations accepted by Rome's civil authorities, who otherwise tended to suspect any private organisation of conspiracy against the status quo. The affluent town of Lanuvium hosted a burial society called "worshippers of Diana and Antinous", founded in 133 AD and headed, supervised and financially underwritten by a patron, a wealthy local civil magistrate. The organisation's charter guaranteed funeral rites and burial, or at least a memorial and image (cenotaph) to represent or house the spirit of the deceased, a legitimate equivalent to a full funeral if the body was missing. Funeral costs were covered on condition that subscriptions were up to date and the member had respected the proprieties due to the Society, its divine and earthly patrons, and its officials. There was no payout for suicides; and "tumultuous or unruly" behaviour at meetings was met with fines. Members paid a joining fee of 100 sesterces (HS), and another 1.25 HS every month, along with an amphora of "good wine"; there were six feasts each year, dedicated to divine and earthly patrons, including the Imperial domus Augusta (in this case, Hadrian, his family, and his deceased lover, the divine Antinous). Lesser officials and executives were elected by the membership from among their own ranks. If contributions lapsed for six months, the member lost all that they had paid in. Slaves could join, with the consent of their master or mistress, and like all other members, could stand for election to time-limited office within the society. Various burial societies existed to serve funeral and social needs within particular professions, such as undertakers, grave-diggers, gladiators, butchers and executioners, who were polluted and dishonoured by their professional association with blood and death, and were categorised as infames (infamous ones), allowed a very restricted set of citizens' rights.

The emperor Nerva supposedly introduced a burial grant of 250 HS for funerals of the city plebs (Rome's lower citizen class), perhaps in a one-off bid for popular support during his brief reign (96–98 AD). Lanuvium's "Worshippers of Diana and Antinous" paid out 250 HS to heirs, to cover the basic obsequies, feast and monument for "a decent yet not very elaborate funeral". In Puteoli at the turn of the Late Republican era, a basic funeral cost around 100 HS, and maybe less. Two centuries on, a socially respectable funeral in Italy would have cost 1000 HS, and probably more. The highest known payout from a burial society is 2,000 HS (CIL 8.2557), in a military context. In most funerals, burial society payouts only covered some of the expenses involved. The remainder - especially the cost of burial plots and tombs - may have come from heirs, families and unofficial benefactions. In Lanuvium, an additional 50 HS was shared out among those at the pyre; a good turn-out of attendant mourners would reflect well on the deceased. The fee of 250 HS could have supported a single person's subsistence for a year. Constantine (reigned 306–337 AD) instituted and subsidised 950 "work stations" for the use of undertakers, grave-diggers and pall-bearers (lecticarii) throughout Constantinople, part of a project to provide the poor with free funeral services. Subsequent emperors expanded the system under Church management, offering free funerals and burial for all Christians, though not heretics. In some cases, however, these nominally free burial spaces were bought and sold by the grave-diggers as marketable commodities.

The by-laws of one burial society are preserved by an inscription dating to 136 AD. Discovered at Lanuvium, the lex collegia salutaris Dianae et Antinoi ("By-laws of the Society of Diana and Antinous") details the cost of joining the society, monthly fees, regulations for the burial of members, and the schedule for the group's meetings and dinners. Another example at Rome was the College of Aesculapius and Hygia, founded by a wealthy woman in honor of her dead husband. Inscriptional evidence exists for burial societies throughout the Empire, not just in the city of Rome.

In 1816, an archeological excavation in Minya, Egypt produced a Nerva–Antonine dynasty-era (second-century AD) clay tablet from the ruins of the Temple of Antinous in Antinoöpolis, Aegyptus that prescribed the rules and membership dues of a burial society collegium established in Lanuvium, Italia in approximately 133 AD. Following the passage of the Lex Julia in 45 BC, and its reaffirmation during the reign of Caesar Augustus (27 BC–14 AD), collegia required the approval of the Roman Senate or the emperor in order to be authorized as legal bodies. Ruins at Lambaesis date the formation of burial societies among Roman soldiers and mariners to the reign of Septimius Severus (193–211) in 198 AD. In September 2011, archeological investigations done at the site of an artificial harbor in Rome, the Portus, revealed inscriptions in a shipyard constructed during the reign of Trajan (98–117) indicating the existence of a shipbuilders guild. Collegia also included fraternities of priests overseeing sacrifices, practicing augury, keeping religious texts, arranging festivals, and maintaining specific religious cults.

== Funerals ==
=== Announcing a death ===
In elite funerals, the body of the deceased could remain in their family home for several days after death, while their funeral was arranged. If the deceased was socially prominent, the death was announced by a herald, in the forum or other central public space. The doors of the family home were closed as a sign of mourning, and cypress branches were displayed outside the entrance, a warning to all, especially the pontifices, that those who entered risked ritual pollution. The family ceased their daily routines for a nine-day mourning period, during which they were considered untouchable, isolated from their broader community because of their contact with death. They should not wash or otherwise care for their own person and could not offer sacrifice to any deity.

=== Preparation of the body ===
When a person died at home, family members and intimate friends gathered around the death bed. If circumstance permitted it, the closest relative sealed the passing of spirit from the body with a last kiss, in accordance with a belief that equated the soul with the breath, then closed the eyes. The relatives began lamentations, the women scratching their faces until they bled, and calling on the deceased by name throughout the funeral ceremony. The family was assisted by an undertaker and his staff, who were allowed to touch and handle the corpse, being permanently ritually unclean by virtue of their profession (see Infamia). The male relatives did not touch the body; it was placed on the ground, washed and anointed by female relatives, then placed on a funerary bier. The placing of the body on the ground is a doublet of birth ritual, when the infant was placed on the bare earth.

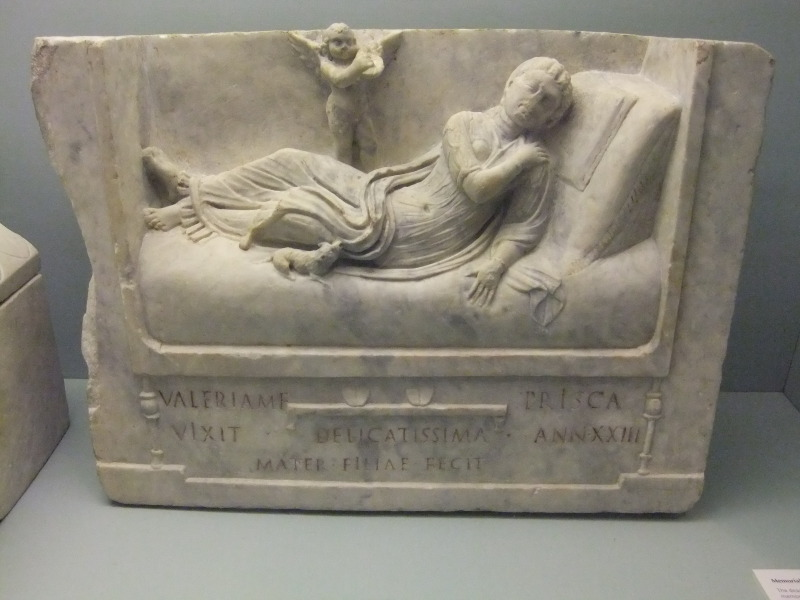
Roman memorial stone, 2nd century AD. The translated inscription reads: "Valeria Prisca, daughter of Marcus, who lived as a great delight for 23 years. Her mother made this for her daughter."

Mourners were expected to wear the dress appropriate to the occasion, and to their station; an elite male citizen might wear a toga pulla (a "dark" toga, reserved for funerals). If the deceased was a male citizen, he was dressed in his toga; if he had attained a magistracy, he wore the toga appropriate to that rank; and if he had earned a wreath in life, he wore one in death. Wreaths also are found in burials of initiates into mystery religions.

The body was arranged on a funeral couch in a lifelike posture, as if on a dining couch. The libitinarii disguised its death-pallor with cosmetics. It lay in state in the atrium of the family home (domus) with the feet pointed toward the door, for seven or more days. Other circumstances pertained to those who lived, as most urban Romans did, in apartment buildings (insulae) or to the rural settings where the vast majority of Romans lived and died; but little is known of them. Elite practices are better documented, though likely often retrospective, idealised, speculative and antiquarian, or poetic. Cicero writes that for most commoners, the time between death and disposal was less than 24 hours. This would have allowed virtually no time for lying in or other long-drawn ceremony.

Embalming was regarded as uncommon, mainly an Egyptian practice, but some instances are mentioned in Latin literature, and others are archaeologically confirmed in the Empire, as far afield as Gaul. Toynbee speculates that a number of these could have been the work of Egyptian priests of Isis and Serapis, in service of clients and converts, or just people who liked the idea of this form of preservation. Since elite funerals required complex and time-consuming arrangements, the body had to be preserved in the meantime, whether it was destined for burial or cremation. The emperor Nero promoted his dead wife Poppaea as a goddess of the Roman state, with divine honours at state expense but broke with imperial tradition and convention by having her embalmed and entombed, rather than cremated.

==== Charon's obol ====
"Charon's obol" was a coin placed in or on the mouth of the deceased. The custom is recorded in literary sources and attested by archaeology, and sometimes occurs in contexts that suggest it may have been imported to Rome as were the mystery religions that promised initiates salvation or special passage in the afterlife. The custom was explained by the myth of Charon, the ferryman who conveyed the souls of the newly dead across the water – a lake, river, or swamp – that separated the world of the living from the underworld. The coin was rationalized as his payment; the satirist Lucian remarks that in order to avoid death, one should simply not pay the fee. In Apuleius's tale of "Cupid and Psyche" in his Metamorphoses, framed by Lucius's quest for salvation ending with initiation into the mysteries of Isis, Psyche ("Soul") carries two coins in her journey to the underworld, the second to enable her return or symbolic rebirth. Evidence of "Charon's obol" appears throughout the Western Roman Empire well into the Christian era, but at no time and place was it practiced consistently and by all.

== Funeral procession ==
Funerals were traditionally held at night for the poor, and for those who died young, "before their time", but there seems to have been no hard and fast rule on the timing or duration of funerals for the elite or middling classes. The last "pagan" emperor, Julian, who attempted a last-ditch regeneration of traditional religious practise, instructed that all funerals be held before daybreak; this, he claimed, was not only traditional but would reduce the chances of death-pollution through accidental contact on crowded streets. He wrote that the gods, being deathless themselves, would naturally find corpses deeply offensive, and because temple doors were usually closed at night and open by day, the gods could take exception to seeing funeral corteges passing their temple precincts in full daylight. He also felt that nighttime funerals harmonised with the idea of death as the "last sleep". His edict may also have been aimed at Christians, who preferred daytime burials and did not consider corpses a pollution.

Prior to this edict, some funerals would have been held in daylight, some at night. Some night-time funerals would have involved only the corpse, litter-bearers, pyre-builders and grave diggers. Most would have lasted just a few hours; a very few high status funerals could only be accomplished over several days. After Augustus' death, at his family villa at Nola, his body was carried to his cremation-site at Rome by relays of local senators, equites and praetorians over several nights. The cortege rested at local basilicas during daylight, seemingly to avoid the heat of the day. Augustus' funeral was a model of propriety and restraint; but in general, public funerals were excellent opportunities for theatrical self-promotion by the bereaved. Crowds for funerals of the famous could be vast. For the most prominent citizens of all, including most emperors, sumptuary laws were ignored or officially suspended. Towards the end of the Republic, the dictator Sulla, given a funeral at public expense, was accompanied by huge numbers of horse and foot-soldiers, magistrates and ordinary citizens, and was carried on a golden litter, accompanied by two thousand gold crowns to represent his offices in life. In such elite funeral processions, hired actors or relatives wore or carried the family's ancestral portrait-masks, described in contemporary sources as "faces", "images" or "masks" – whether life-masks or death masks is not known. Each represented an ancestor who had held public office, and as in life, was preceded by a lictor. Practice may have varied by period or by family, since sources give no consistent account. Displays of these ancestral images in aristocratic houses, and their uses in public funerals are described by Pliny the Elder.

Where possible, the bier was carried by men of the family, or male close friends, or freed slaves performing this last duty to their owner; at least four bearers, up to eight, are shown on funeral depictions. A professional guild (collegium) of musicians specialized in funeral music, in which flutes played a major and emotionally effectual part; the number of flutes employed at funerals was limited by sumptuary laws. Horace mentions use of the tuba and the cornu, two bronze trumpet-like instruments, at funerals. For socially prominent individuals, and those whose public service was honoured with a publicly funded funeral, a eulogy was given in the forum, delivered from the Rostra. In a private funeral, the eulogy was delivered at the grave-side.

=== Eulogy ===
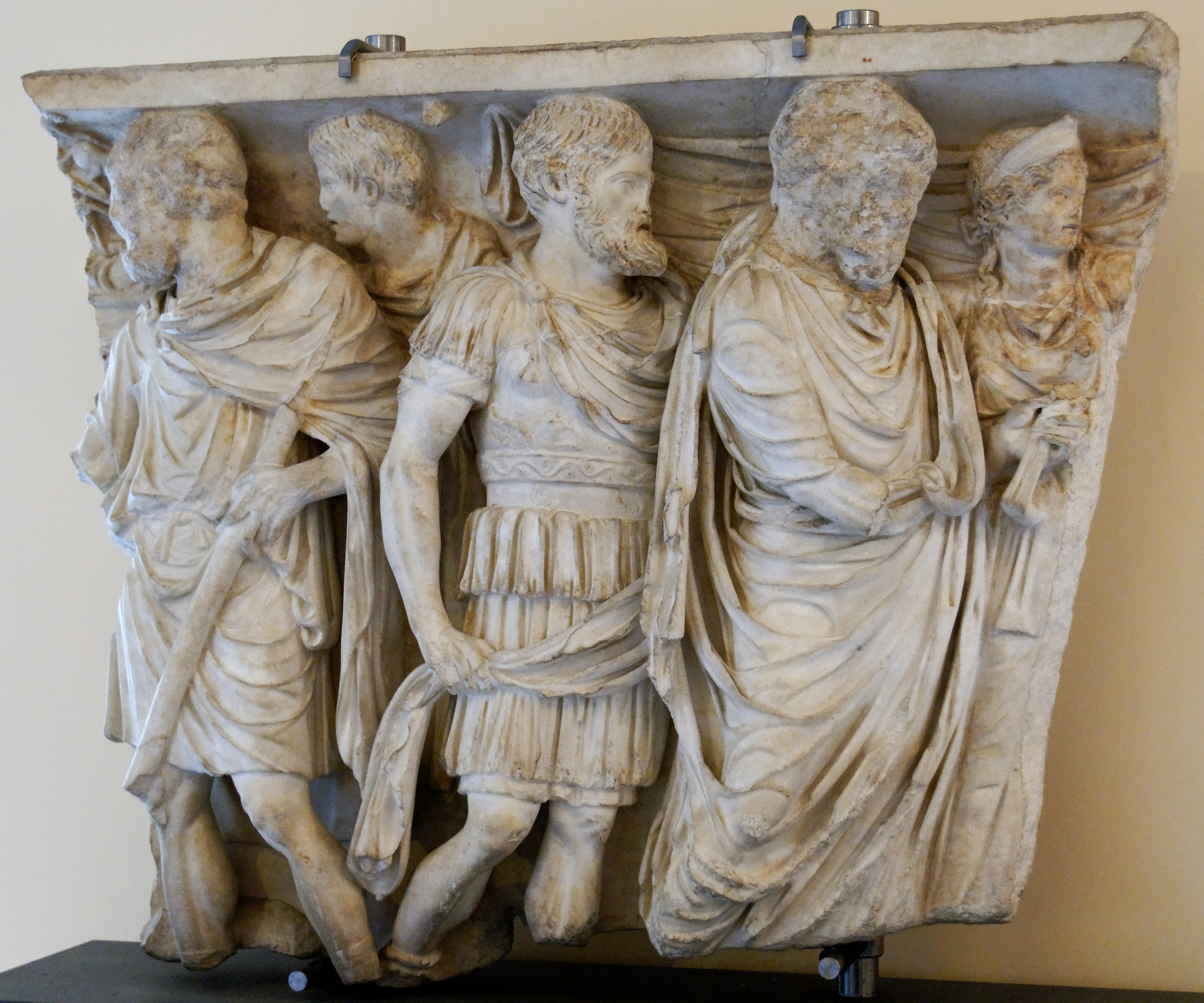
Fragment of a relief from a sarcophagus depicting stages of the deceased's life: religious initiation, military service, and wedding (mid-2nd century AD)

The eulogy (laudatio funebris) was a formal oration or panegyric in praise of the dead. It was one of two forms of discourse at a Roman funeral, the other being the chant (nenia), most of which was performed by women. Male mourners might express their grief by a dignified groaning (gemitus); anything more was thought improper. These practices are associated with noble families, and the conventions for words spoken at an ordinary person's funeral go unrecorded. While public oratory was practiced in Rome only by men, an elite woman might also be honored with a public eulogy, though this was a rare event. In the most illustrious families, eulogies would tell of the successes and deeds of both the deceased and of their ancestors, impersonated by the actors or relatives seated on the rostra, each on the curule chair appropriate to the highest office held, appropriately dressed and masked. Cicero and Livy say that these claims were sometimes false, perhaps (they are not explicit) by falsely claiming descent.

A well-delivered funeral oration could be a way for a young politician to publicize himself. Aunt Julia's Eulogy (Laudatio Juliae Amitae), a speech made by the young Julius Caesar in honor of his aunt, the widow of Gaius Marius, underlined his own claims to divine and kingly ancestry, and helped launch his political career as a populist. Marius, popular reformist and seven-times consul, had been Caesar's political sponsor.

The epitaph of the deceased in effect was a digest of the eulogy made visible and permanent, and might include the career (cursus honorum) of a man who had held public offices. In commemorating past deeds, the eulogy was a precursor to Roman historiography.

== Disposal ==
Cemeteries were usually sited outside the city boundary to avoid the physical and ritual pollution of the living by the dead. Cicero (in De Legibus, 2, 23, 58) categorises this as one of Rome's ancient Laws of Twelve Tables. Some prominent statesmen might have a right of burial in long-established family tombs within the ritual boundary (pomerium) of the city; but this was a rare privilege, and was seldom exercised.

=== Sacrifices ===
A portable altar was set up at the place of burial or cremation pyre, and the heir offered sacrifice of a pig in the presence of the deceased, usually to Ceres, Rome's principal grain, harvest and field goddess. Though not an underworld deity, Ceres was doorwarden between the realms of the living and the dead. The shade of the deceased could not pass into the underworld or afterlife without her consent. The sacrificial victim was consecrated by sprinkling with mola salsa, a sacred mixture of salt and grain or flour, then stunned or killed with an axe or hammer, turned on its back and gutted. The guts (exta), the "divine portion" of the sacrifice, were placed in an earthenware pot (olla) and examined.

Abnormality in the exta indicated divine rejection of the offering, in which case the sacrifice must be repeated with a fresh victim. If all seemed satisfactory, the victim was cut up, and distributed between the presiding goddess, the mourners and the shade of the deceased. The di Manes were given their portion separately; it was believed that the living who shared a meal with the di Manes effectively offered themselves to the dead, and could suffer consequences. On the other hand, families and the departed could share anniversary and festive meals. Almost all sacrificial meat was given to the mourners, roasted and eaten. At funeral meals, a small portion for the deceased was cremated on a spit with the body or, if a burial, placed alongside it. The exta were burned on the portable altar, consumed by the flames as Ceres' portion. As far as Cicero was concerned, unless a sow had been sacrificed a burial was not religious and a grave was not a grave.

Sacrifice had to be offered and accepted to secure an afterlife and resting place for the deceased. The highest status funerals might sacrifice a more costly domestic animal, such as an ox, or several victims of different kinds; and while animal sacrifice was preferred, those who could not afford it could offer a libation of wine, and grain or other foodstuffs; a less potent offering than animal sacrifice but Ovid says that Ceres is content with little, as long as the offering is pure.

=== Cremation, inhumation and os resectum ===
At a cremation funeral, the heir lit the pyre with a torch, his face averted. Once the corpse had been consumed in the fire, the spirit of the deceased was thought to have begun its separation from the world of the living. After a cremation, the heir sprinkled the ashes with wine, gathered them along with any traces of bone, placed them in a cremation urn and interred them. This was sometimes done by the wife of the deceased; Livia did so with the ashes of her husband, the emperor Augustus.

The ashes were interred either in or next to the cremation site (in which case the funeral place was a bustum) or interred elsewhere, in which case the cremation place was known as ustrinum (plural, ustrina); the deceased could be commemorated both at the ustrinum and the place of ash-burial. A single ustrinum, usually stone-built, could accommodate many successive cremations, and usually belonged to a single family. Some were several storeys high, and functioned as a chimney, whose fires could be fed from beneath. Mass cremations, in which several bodies were burned simultaneously in the same pyre were efficient but were used only for the poor, or during epidemics, or on battlefields. Otherwise the ustrinum was supposed to be cleared after use, to avoid the mixing of ashes from different bodies, though a few cases are known in which this was deliberately done. Caracalla deliberately mixed the ashes of his brother Geta with those of his executed supporters, as a final insult. On the other hand, a few examples are known of couples whose ashes were contained in the same vessel, as an expression of love.

Inhumation was practiced regularly in archaic Rome, but in the Mid- to Late Republic and the Empire into the 1st and 2nd centuries, cremation became the most common burial practice. Toynbee describes the change from burial to cremation as generally starting, excepting a few noble families, by 400 BC. Patrician members of the gens Cornelia continued inhumating their dead until 79 BC, when the dictator Sulla became the first patrician Cornelius to be cremated, perhaps because he feared that otherwise his body would be defaced by supporters of his arch-enemy, Gaius Marius. The ancient Sepulcretum, in the Roman Forum, shows evidence of both inhumation and cremation, and laws relating to both practices go back to the 5th century BC.

Cremation was far more costly and time-consuming than inhumation; at its simplest and least costly, inhumation required little more than a scraped hollow in the ground, with some form of covering. The planning and execution of cremations required expertise. The unplanned cremations of Pompey and Caligula left their bodies part-burnt for want of sufficient fuel or skill. Wood for pyres was expensive; on average, an effective, well built pyre employed about half a cord of timber - and once lit, it must be tended for 8 or 9 hours to ensure that the body was completely consumed. For cremations of the elite, coin and sculptural evidence for pyres usually shows eight layers of timber, each laid at right angles to those above and below, with the whole resembling an altar and the body at least partly concealed within. The smoke of the pyre could be sweetened with aromatic herbs, leaves and libations. For the elite, incense could be burnt; it not only masked unpleasant smells, but being resinous was highly flammable. At Ostia, and probably elsewhere, municipally funded funerals for ex-officials were sometimes granted up to 50 pounds of incense. For the highest status cremations, pyres of several storeys were built, with a lavishly decorated exterior and an equally well-appointed "room" within, to house the corpse on its funeral couch. Offerings to be consumed in the flames of the pyre were placed around the body. In some cases, a wax replica of the deceased was placed atop the pyre. In the deification of deceased emperors, a caged eagle was concealed in the pyre, and released on cue to seemingly carry the Imperial soul to heaven.

Crematory images on the theme of the dead and mourning appear in Latin poetry. In one of the best-known classical Latin poems of mourning, Catullus writes of his long journey to attend to the funeral rites of his brother, who died abroad, and expresses his grief at addressing only silent ash. When Propertius describes his dead lover Cynthia visiting him in a dream, the revenant's dress is scorched down the side and the fire of the pyre has corroded the familiar ring she wears.

In the late 1st century AD, cremation was such a commonplace that Tacitus could refer to it as Romanus mos ("the Roman Way"). Plutarch recounts a tradition that king Numa Pompilius, who was credited with the introduction of Rome's most important religious practices, forbade cremation. Perhaps in at least partial continued obedience to this prohibition, and perhaps on the understanding that "a part implies the whole", a complete finger could be cut from the corpse before its cremation and either buried separately, unburnt, or burned in a smaller, cooler fire at the end of the mourning period. This may have been done to complete the household's purification, and to fully return the deceased to mother Earth and legitimise the grave. The practice, known as os resectum ("cut-off bone") is attested by literary sources and to some extent, by archaeology, in at least one cremation of a named individual of senatorial class, and in several columbaria deposits, likely of freedmen or very ordinary citizens.

Over time, inhumation once again became the norm. Bodel (2008) places the main transition from cremation to burial as starting among slaves and freedmen around the mid-first century AD. Eventually, cremation remained a feature of imperial deification funerals, and very few others. The reasons for this shift are not well understood. Some evidence points to Christianity's preservation of the body, following the example of Jesus' entombment, anticipating resurrection: the veneration of martyrs' physical remains: the proscriptions and preferences of mystery religions, the sheer cost of cremation, compared to burial: or the philosophical influence by the wealthier class in the Roman empire.

=== Novendialis ===
A second funeral feast and rites called the novendialis or novemdialis were held nine days or more after death. Another sacrifice was often made, to the Manes of the deceased (or possibly, the family Penates – Cicero has a ram sacrificed as an offering to the family Lares). As a recipient of sacrifice, the deceased was now a deity, albeit one of the numberless underworld dii manes. The entire body of the sacrificial victim was burned on the ground, and a libation to the Manes of the deceased was poured onto the grave. The sacrificial meat was not shared between the living and the dead. Purification rites were held, using "fire and water", to finally separate the deceased from the world of the living. This concluded the period of full mourning and released the family from their funeral obligations. Mourning dress was put aside, open house was declared and a feast was given. Among the elite, ancient laws of Numa released the men of the family from further mourning; women of the family could be nominated to continue mourning on behalf of the entire household, for up to 10 months, releasing their menfolk from the strictures of formal mourning, and back into public life and its obligations.

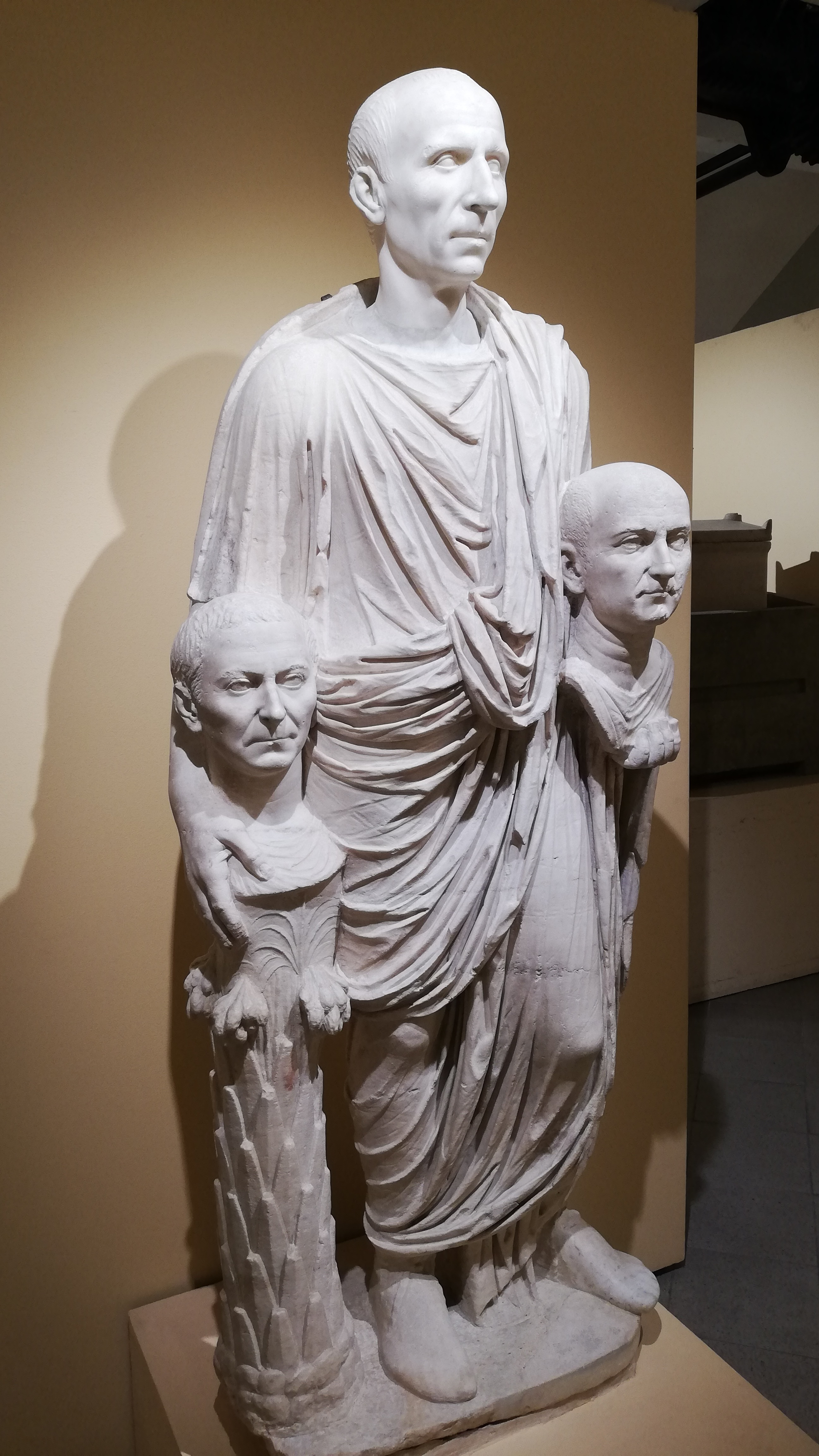
The so-called Togatus Barberini in the Capitoline Museums may represent a senator holding two ancestral funerary portraits; these have been claimed in some modern commentaries as examples of the imagines described by some Latin sources.

== Grave goods ==
=== Adults ===
Grave goods for adults could include fine quality clothing, personal ornaments, perfumes, food and drink, and blood, which the deceased presumably needed, or enjoyed. Lamps were ubiquitous. From the earliest times, food and drink, and sacrifices to deities, were generally offered in ollae; these were often used to contain the inhumed ashes of the deceased; the ashes of several individuals might thus be accommodated on a single tomb-shelf.

In some burials, grave goods appear to have been ritualistically "killed", being deliberately damaged before burial. In others, damaged goods may have been used as a matter of economy. Some graves contain one or more large nails, possibly to help "fix" the shade of the dead in the grave, and prevent their wandering from their proper place.

=== Infants and children ===
Roman literary and legal sources declared that concern for dead, un-teethed newborns was irrational, and mourning them was self-indulgent and hysterical. Nevertheless, grave goods in infant burials could include toys, pets, food and images of protective childhood or birth deities, to guard the child's soul on its journey. Cemeteries containing an unusually high number of infant and child burials could indicate a nearby shrine or sanctuary, since lost, where parents had sought divine intervention and healing for children who had died despite their efforts. Cemeteries with disproportionately scant material evidence of infant or still-born deaths have been interpreted as confirmatory evidence for a general lack of care, or a culture of emotional indifference to the very young; this apparent lack may have more to do with soil conditions unfavourable to the preservation of infant remains, carelessness in past excavations, and over-reliance on the opinionated and unreliable pronouncements of elite literary sources as a guide to contemporary practice, and thus to the planning of later excavations.

In Roman Britain, many burial and cremation sites of infants who had teethed and died contained small jet bear carvings, lunulae and phallic symbols, beads, bells, coins, and pottery beakers. In the Graeco-Roman world, the bear was an animal of Artemis (or for Romans, Diana), the divine virgin huntress and patron goddess of wild animals, protectress of childbirth, nursing and infants, especially infant girls. In Brescia, Italy, bear figurines appear to have functioned as guides and companions for children in the afterlife. The lunula, and the phallus with a horn invoked protection from evil and misfortune. Beads found in burial sites were often made from materials used for medicinal purposes in the realm of the living, such as jet, which Pliny claims in his Historia Naturalis can cure toothaches and other ailments. Bells, especially tintinnabuli helped to drive away evil and avert the evil eye. Bells were also set into the mortar of the Roman Catacombs as a protective device over children's tombs. This was especially common in the fourth century.

== Commemorations ==
The care and cultivation of the dead did not end with the funeral and formal period of mourning, but was a perpetual obligation. Cicero states that the main and overriding function of the priesthood with respect to the dead accorded with universal, natural law: to keep alive the memory of the deceased, by holding the traditional rites. Ancient votive deposits to the noble dead of Latium and Rome suggest elaborate and costly funeral offerings and banquets in the company of the deceased, an expectation of afterlife and their personal association with the gods. As Roman society developed, its Republican nobility tended to invest less in spectacular funerals and extravagant housing for their dead, and more on monumental endowments to the community, such as the donation of a temple or public building whose donor was durably commemorated by their statue and inscribed name. Elite, private tomb inscriptions offer evidence for a very wide range of memorial practices, such as funeral games, drawn from neighbouring cultures and communities.

=== Funeral games (ludi funebres) ===
Roman and Greek literature offers dramatic accounts of games to honour or propitiate the spirits of the dead. In Homer's Iliad, Book 23, funeral games are held by Achilles to honour Patroclus, and in Virgil's Aeneid, Book 5, Aeneas holds games on the anniversary of his father's death. Very similar episodes are depicted on the walls of elite tombs in Etruria, and Campania; some appear to show combats to the death. The first such ludi funebres in Rome were given in 264 BC, during the war against Carthage; three pairs of gladiators fought to the death at the pyre of Brutus Pera, in what was described as a munus (pl. munera), a duty or provision owed to an ancestor by his descendants – in this case, his son. A feast was provided for friends and family; this may have been on the last day of the novendialis. Similar gladiatora munera became a core event at elite Roman funeral games. In the late Republic, a munus held for the funeral of the ex-consul and Pontifex Maximus Publius Licinius in 183 BC involved 120 gladiators fighting over 3 days, public distribution of meat (visceratio data) and the crowding of the forum with dining couches and tents as venue for the feast.

Gladiator munera became very popular, but they were also thought luxurious, self-indulgent and potentially corrupting. The host (editor) of a munus stood to gain votes in his political career for even the promise of funeral games. Sulla broke his own sumptuary laws during his stint as praetor to honour his dead wife, Metella, with an exceptionally lavish gladiator munus. The gladiators themselves could be admired for their courage, and despised for the bloodiness of their profession, whose function could approximate that of an executioner. The insulting term bustuarius ("tomb-man") was sometimes used for the lower class of gladiator, who might be perceived as no more than provider of living blood to the spirits of the dead. Julius Caesar broke any strict link between funerals and munera when he dedicated his ludi of 65 BC, with its 320 pairs of gladiators, to his father, who had been dead for 20 years.

In the Imperial era, the state took over the organisation and subsidy of the most extravagant gladiatora munera, incorporating them into the existing, long-standing roster of public, state-sponsored events (ludi), and identifying them with the generosity of Imperial officialdom. Any originally religious elements in these munera tended to be subsumed by their entertainment value. In the mid-to-late Empire, Christian spectators who commented on the gladiator games thought them a particularly savage and perverse form of human sacrifice to "pagan demons".

=== Festivals and cults of the dead ===
Starting on 13 February, dead parents and their ancestors were honoured at a nine-day annual festival, the Parentalia, a legal obligation of every paterfamilias. Its opening rites were performed by the Vestal Virgins. Families made their various ways to the extramural cemeteries where their ancestors had been laid to rest, and held extravagant feasts at their family tombs. Behaviour at Parentalia varied between ostentatious public display and (according to Christian witnesses) drunken joie de vivre. The last day of Parentalia was Feralia (21 February), a somewhat darker affair in which the ancestors (the di Manes) were placated with "an arrangement of wreaths, a sprinkling of grain and a bit of salt, bread soaked in wine and violets scattered about". Feralia was also an exorcism: Ovid thought it a more rustic, primitive and ancient affair than the Parentalia itself. It appears to have functioned as a cleansing ritual for Caristia on the following day, when the family held an informal banquet to celebrate the mutual affection between themselves and their benevolent ancestral dead (whom Ovid identifies as Lares). The midnight rites of the Lemuria festival (9, 11, and 13 May), were yet more ancient and obscure; families were redeemed at midnight from the potentially threatening lemures, understood to be vagrant or resentful di manes or di parentes, the spirits of those family members who had died "before their time" (through disease, accident or violence) and could not enter a full afterlife until they reached a "natural term". Until then, their yearly care, or exorcism as malignant spirits, was a duty of the family's paterfamilias, who must spit black beans onto the floor of the family home at midnight, as food for the dead. Any malign spirit not satisfied by this offering could be exorcised from the domus by the family's loud clashing of bronze pots.

In the city of Rome, on 24 August, 5 October and 8 November, a hemispherical pit or vault, known as the mundus cerialis (literally "the world" of Ceres or Caereris mundus) was opened with the official announcement "mundus patet" ("the mundus is open"). Offerings were made there to underworld deities, and to Ceres as guardian goddess of the fruitful earth and its underworld portals. Its opening offered the spirits of the dead temporary leave from the underworld, to roam lawfully among the living, in what Warde Fowler describes as 'holidays, so to speak, for the ghosts'. The significance of this ritual remains uncertain; tradition dated it to the foundation of Rome by Romulus, who established a state grain-store as a common resource, on the Etruscan model. The shape of the mundus was described as a reflection or inversion of the dome of the upper heavens. The opening of the mundus was among the very few occasions that Romans made official contact with their collective di Manes – the others being Parentalia and Lemuralia. Other events such as the Rosalia (festival of Roses), the Violaria (a festival of Attis) but especially the dies natalis (birthday) and death-day of the deceased were observed by the pious, with an abundance of flowers, sacrifice and family feasts.

=== Epitaphs ===
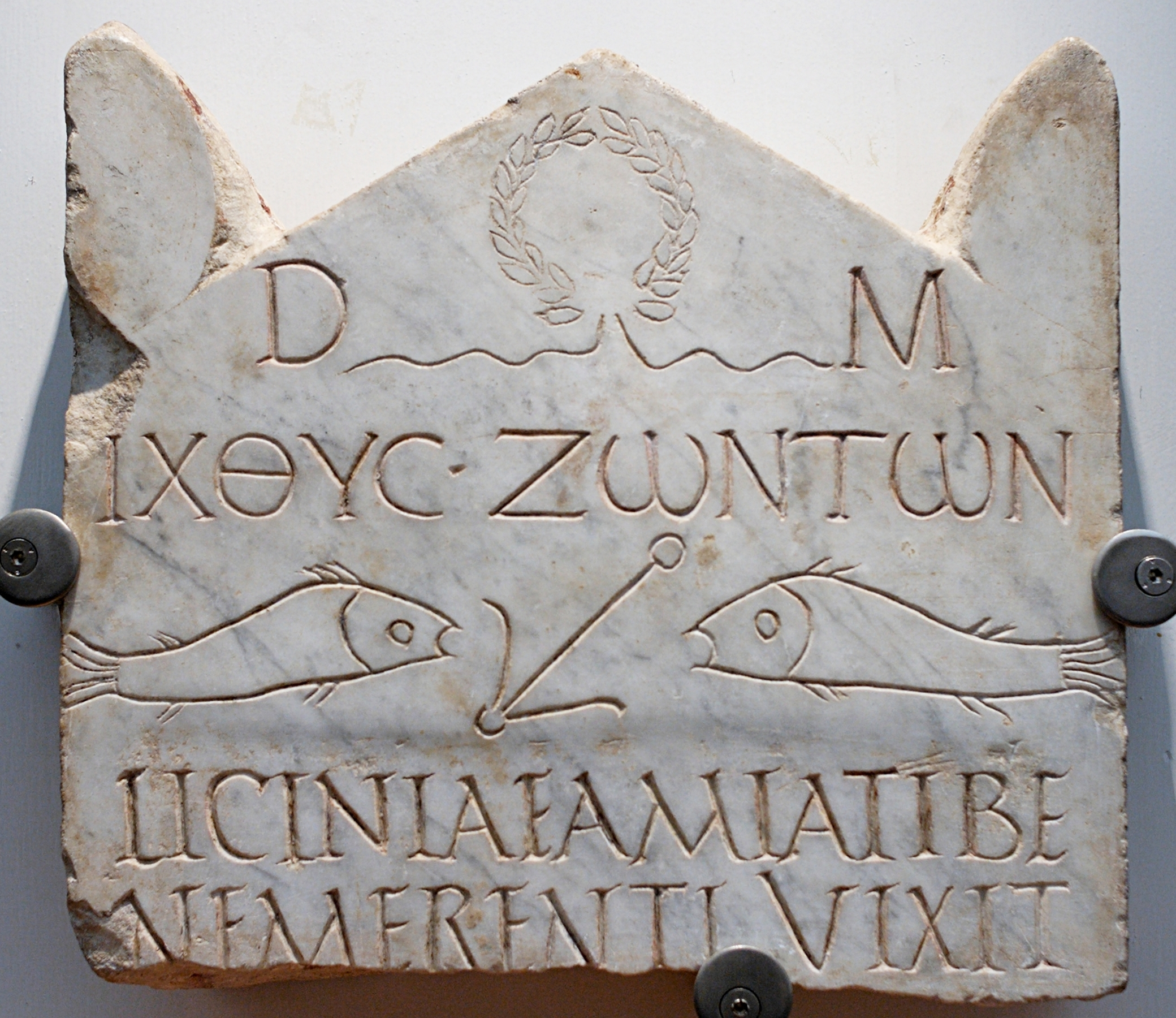
This funerary stele, one of the earliest Christian inscriptions (3rd century), combines the traditional abbreviation D. M., for Dis Manibus, "to the Manes gods," with the Christian motto Ikhthus zōntōn ("fish of the living") in Greek; the deceased's name is in Latin.

Epitaphs are one of the major classes of inscriptions. Additional information varies, but collectively, Roman epitaphs offer information on family relationships, political offices, and Roman values, in choosing what aspects of the deceased's life to praise. In a funeral culture that sought to perpetuate remembrance of the dead beyond the power of individual memory, epitaphs and markers counted for a lot. The inscription sit tibi terra levis (commonly abbreviated as S·T·T·L) is a commonplace marking on funerary items, approximately translating as "May the earth rest lightly on you". A standard Roman funerary dedication is Dis Manibus ("to the Manes-gods"). Regional variations include its Greek equivalent, theoîs katachthoníois and Lugdunum's locally commonplace but mysterious "dedicated under the trowel" (sub ascia dedicare). There is a profound shift in content during the rise in dominance of Christianity. While traditional epitaphs usually note the person's day of birth, earthly achievements and lifespan, Christian inscriptions tend to emphasise the day of death, a transition to a hoped-for heavenly "new life".

Philosophical beliefs may also be in evidence. The epitaphs of Epicureans often expressed some form of the sentiment non fui, fui, non sum, non desidero, "I did not exist, I have existed, I do not exist, I feel no desire", or non fui, non sum, non curo, "I did not exist, I do not exist, I'm not concerned about it". Among the non-elite, fond epitaphs for the young, both freeborn and slaves - Dasen gives examples ranging from 2 years old to 13 – tend to make much of their brief lifetimes, tragically wasted talents, the pleasure they gave and what they would have achieved in life had fate not intervened.

For those families who could not afford a durable inscription, the passage of time would have brought considerable anxiety, as such grave markers as they could provide gradually eroded, shifted or were displaced, with the grave's exact location, and the identity of the deceased, lost as the cemetery gradually filled. Many would have received no marker or epitaph at all; most of Rome's slaves were servi rustici, used for agricultural labour, and very few of them had the opportunities afforded to many urban household slaves, to buy their freedom with money earned and a promise of future favours. Almost all would have been enslaved for the whole of their lives, "and it is thought that they practically never appear in the epigraphic (or any other) record".

=== Imagines ("images") ===
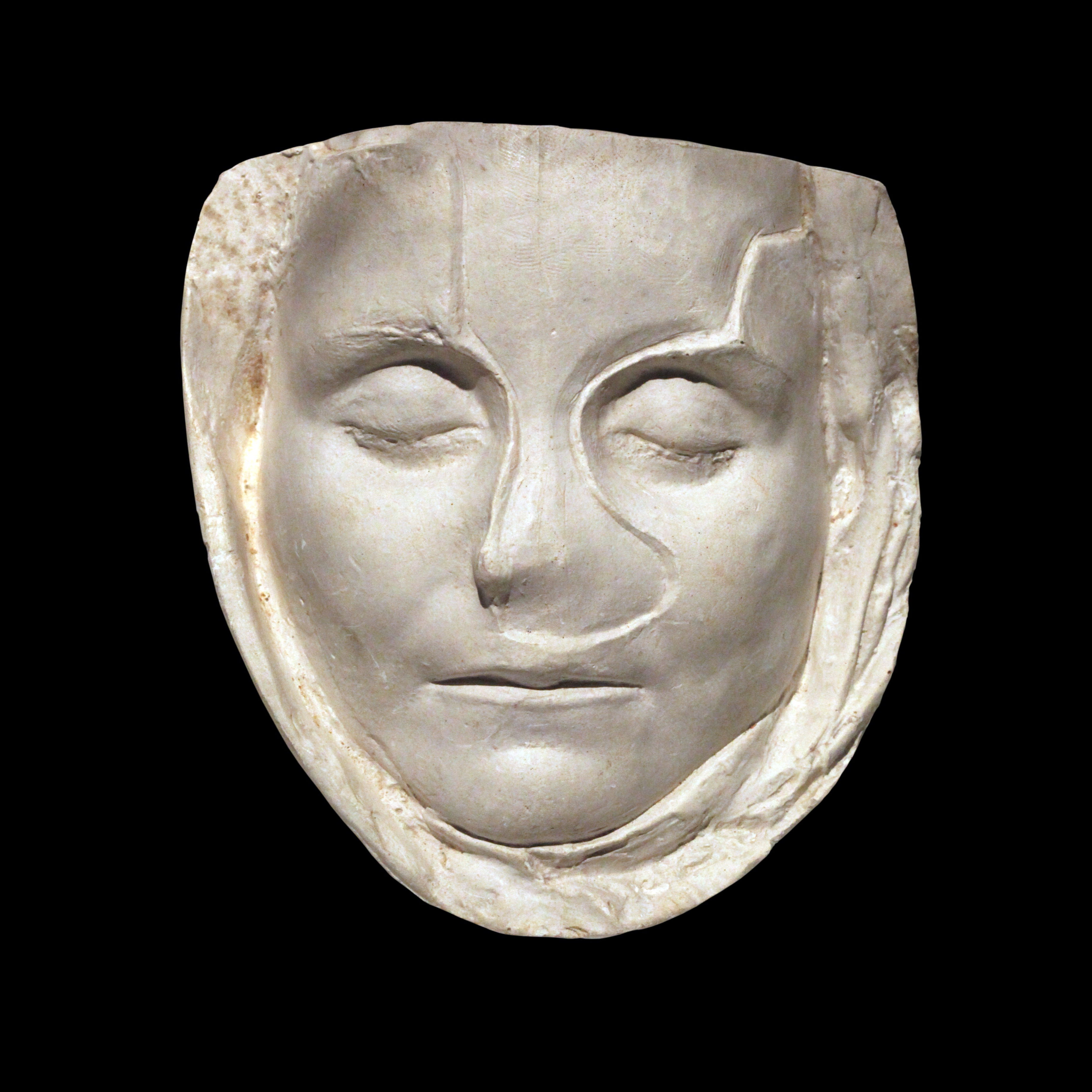
Molded mask of a girl with funerary inscription from Roman Gaul

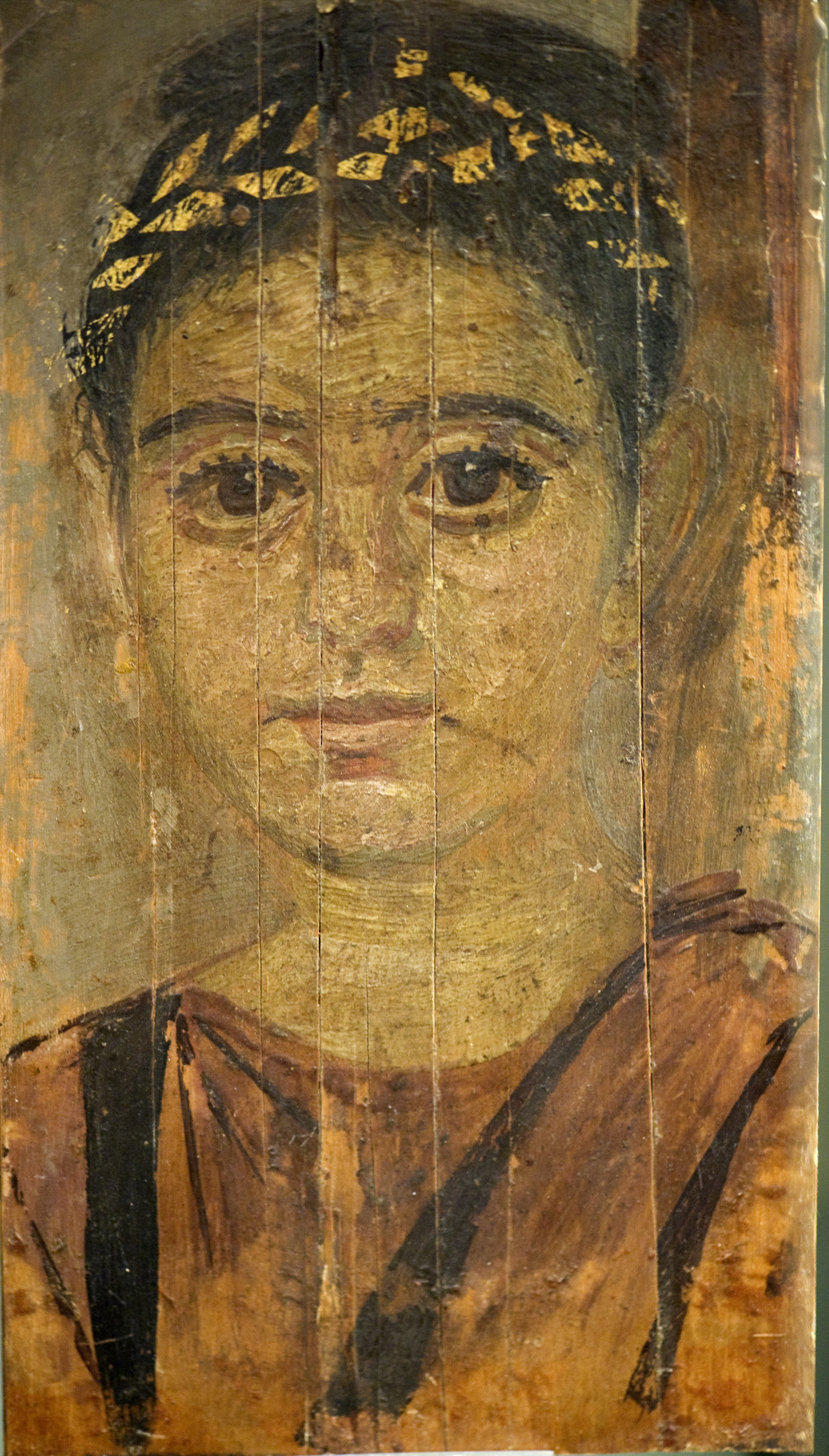
Mummy portrait of a girl wearing a gold wreath, from Roman Egypt

The "images" (sing. imago, pl. imagines) displayed by some noble Roman families at funerals were usually kept in cabinets made for the purpose, in the atrium of their family home. (Note: A supposed ius imaginis ("right of the image") has sometimes been thought to restrict this privilege to the nobiles based on a single passage by Cicero, (Contra Verres, 5.14.36), referring to aedile's privileges to pass down their own portraits to descendants. Scholars now are more likely to see the display of ancestral images as a social convention or product of affluence. See, for instance, Walker and Burnett. and others.) There is some uncertainty about whether these imagines maiorum ("images of the great ones") were funeral masks, lifemasks, busts, or all of these. The "images" could be arranged in a family tree, with a title (titulus) summarizing the individual's offices held (honores) and accomplishments (res gestae), a practice that might be facilitated by hanging masks. In any case, portrait busts of family members in stone or bronze were displayed in the home as well.

These imagines were most likely made of wax, coloured and detailed to create as accurate a depiction as possible. They were not only used at funerals but were also displayed at important family gatherings such as weddings. They were therefore not housed in the tomb, but in the family domus. Their making was acknowledged as requiring a high level of skill; they were intended as a faithful rendition of their subject, but were apparently not considered works of art.

Since references to imagines often fail to distinguish between stone or bronze commemorative portrait busts – extant examples of which are abundant – and funeral masks made of more perishable materials, none can be identified with certainty as having survived. Three-dimensional, highly realistic images of deceased nobles are known to have been consumed by fire in the highest status cremation funerals; for example, at Sulla's and Julius Caesar's funerals, and at the "funus imaginarium" (funeral of the image) of emperor Septimius Severus. Caesar's wax image, placed on the pyre above his mortal remains, showed the wounds of his murder. Septimius' body had already been cremated, where he had died, in Britain; in Herodian's version, the emperor's ashes were brought to Rome and reverentially laid to rest in his mausoleum. Meanwhile, his veristic wax image lay in state for seven days, during which it was diagnosed as increasingly ill by the imperial physicians, then declared dead by them on the seventh day and cremated on a vast pyre, in a grand public display of deification, including the release of an eagle "bearing his soul to heaven":

Among the non-elite, child burials were sometimes accompanied by a plaster death mask, or in some cases, the plaster negative mould from which such a mask, or the child's face, could be reconstructed; "the means for constructing the memory of families who invested their ambitions in their descendants and substituted their children for illustrious ancestors". The veristic tradition of funerary likenesses, however, contributed to the development of realistic Roman portraiture. In Roman Egypt, the Fayum mummy portraits reflect traditions of Egyptian and Roman funerary portraiture and the techniques of Hellenistic painting.

== Graves, tombs, and cemeteries ==
=== Urban and suburban ===
In Rome, burial places were "always limited and frequently contested". The legislation that forbade almost all burial within the ritual boundaries of Roman cities and towns led to the development of necropolises alongside extramural roads, veritable "cities of the dead", with their own main and access roads, water supplies and prime development sites for grand monuments or mausolea. Amenities for visitors included rooms for family dining, kitchens and kitchen gardens. There was no zoning as such; the burial consecrated the ground, not vice versa, and the land beyond each tomb's perimeter was profane, open to public access. Plots could be rented or bought, with or without user-ready or customised tombs. The great cemetery of Isola Sacra and the tombs that line both sides of the Via Appia Antica offer notable examples of roadside cemeteries. In the city of Rome, tombs also lined both embankments of the Tiber, a major waterway whose towpaths and wharves were in near-constant use. Tombs were still being built there in the Imperial era, despite the hindrances they must have posed to businesses at docks and wharves, and the planning, building and maintenance of riverine roadways, bridges and aqueducts. Rome was virtually encircled by its dead.

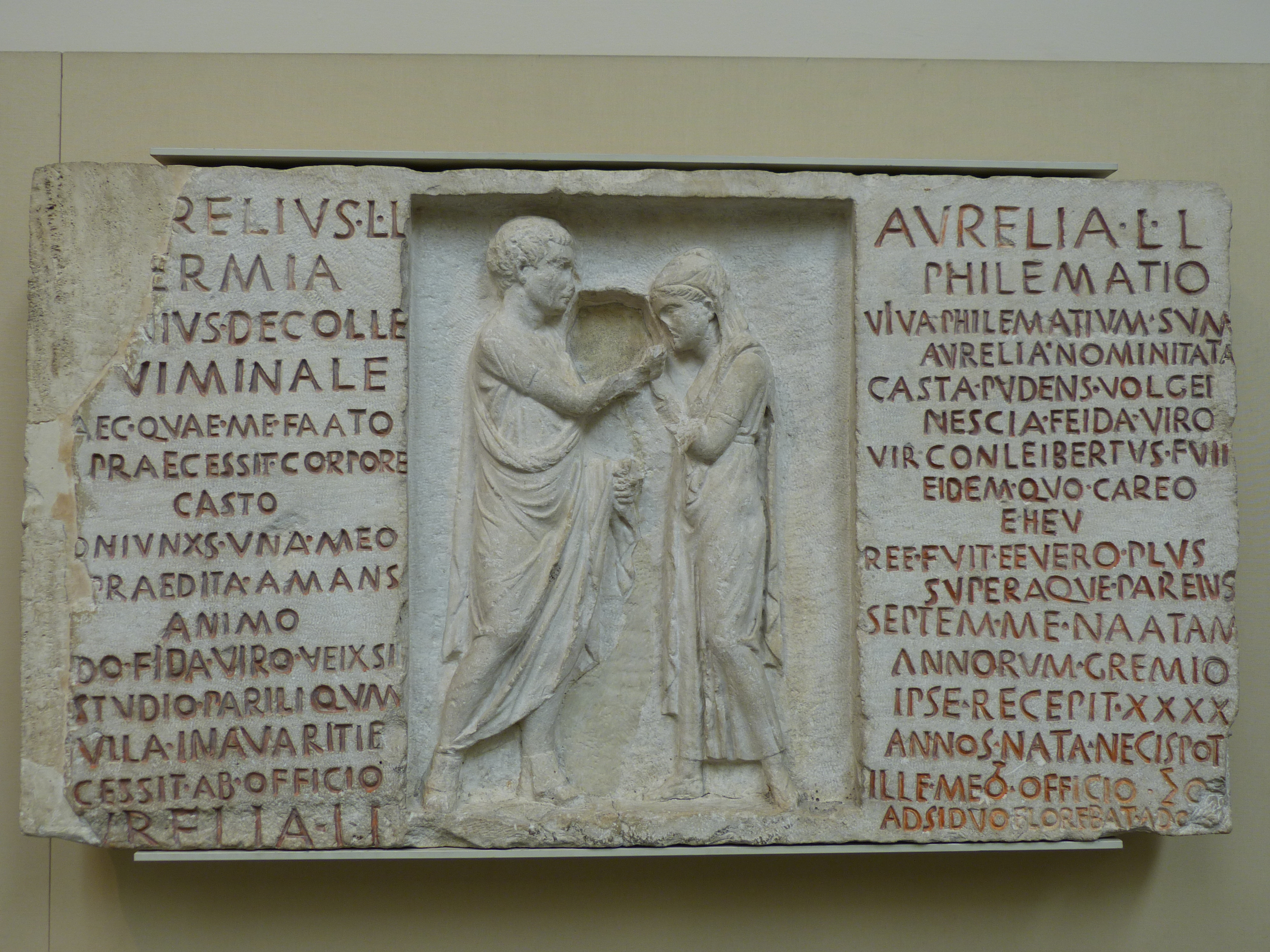
An inscribed funerary relief of Aurelius Hermia and his wife Aurelia Philematum, former slaves who married after their manumission, 80 BC, from a tomb along the Via Nomentana in Rome

Cemeteries, tombs and their dead were protected by religious and civil laws and interdicts. A place used for burial was a locus religiosus; it belonged to the Manes gods because a body was buried there, or found there. Its disturbance was thought to cause pain and discomfort to the deceased, whether senator or slave. The discovery of any previously unknown interment on profane (public or private) land created an immediate encumbrance to its further use; it had revealed itself as a locus religiosus, and remained so unless the pontifs agreed to revoke its status and remove the body or bones. Death by lightning strike was thought a clear statement by Jupiter that the place and the victim belonged to him; the place was marked out accordingly, and the victim buried, though not with "ordinary rites".

Cicero records a major pontifical decision that any grave in publicly owned land was unlawful, and therefore could not be treated as a locus religiosus. The decision paved the way for a mass exhumation of cemetery land just outside Rome's Colline Gate, and its eventual re-use as public land. At more or less the same time, cremation hearths (ustrina) and rubbish dumping were banned from the Esquiline and for 2 miles beyond the city wall. Cicero thought that all this had to do with minimising the risk of fires; that was a factor, but the Esquiline's odour was a more immediate and notorious public nuisance. Augustus' ally Maecenas covered the site with 25 feet depth of soil, built himself a luxury urban villa there and opened its extensive gardens to the public, all at his own expense; this earned him much credit as a public benefactor. Various funerary structures built on Rome's outskirts by wealthy patrons around this time have been suggested as attempts to serve the funeral needs of the very poor. They included extensive columbaria with built-in, efficient mass-crematoria. In the Imperial era, cremation and tomb provision were displays of patronage; for example, the entirely underground columbaria with spaces for freedmen of the Julio-Claudian house, at the Vigna Colina site.

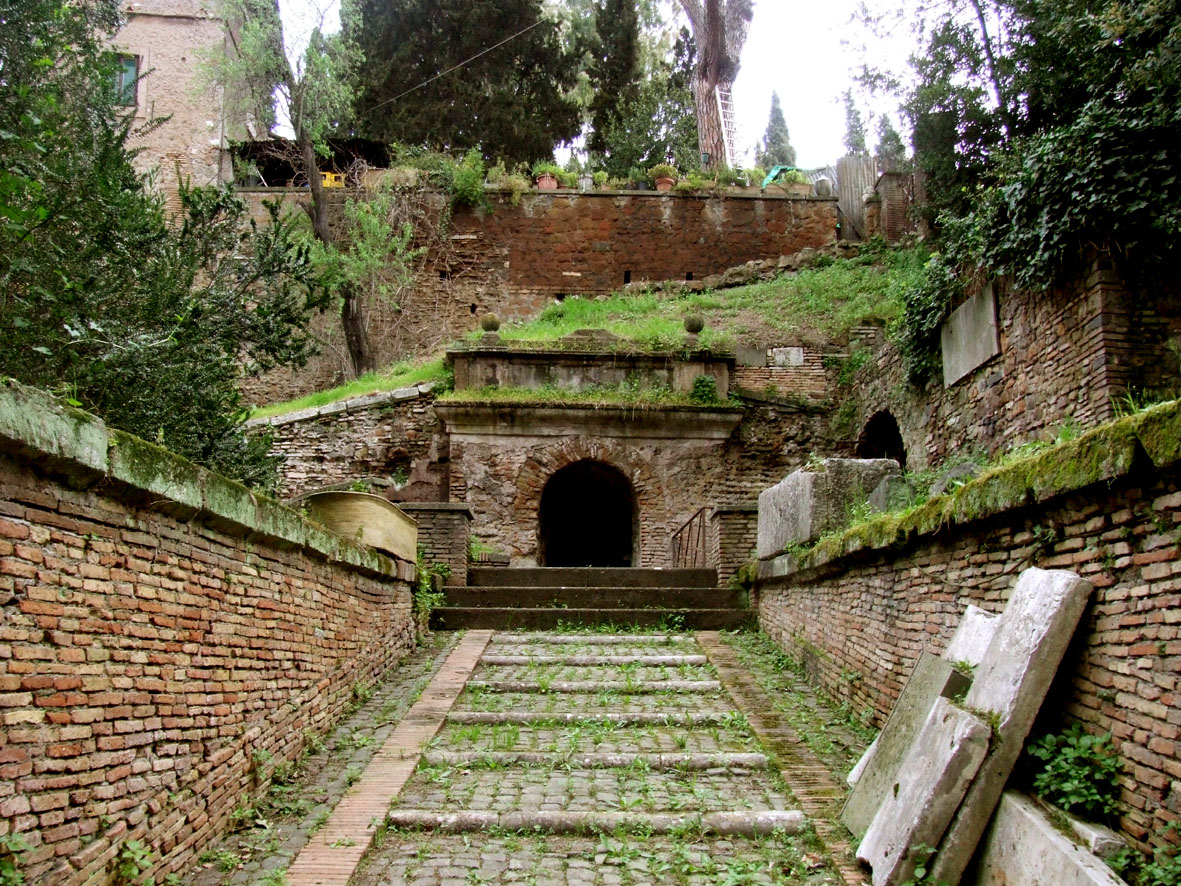
Tomb of the Cornelii Scipios, in use from the 3rd century BC to the 1st century AD, then abandoned. Its fabric was incorporated into the Aurelian walls.

Disturbance or damage to tombs, memorials and lawfully interred human remains carried substantial penalties – malicious damage was a capital offence, though detection and punishment or compensation rather depended on whose remains, tombs, or memorials were involved, and who was applying or ignoring the law. The Via Basiliano's necropolis of 545 graves, jammed together and even overlapping, provides the evidence that violation of burial law was a "sore fact of life". Memorial stones have been found incorporated into houses, reused to create monuments to completely unrelated persons, and recycled in official buildings. In Puteoli, the municipality fined anyone who damaged the tomb of a decurion (a local, junior magistrate) 20,000 sestercii. Offenders could be prosecuted in civil courts. Some tomb inscriptions offer a cash reward to anyone who reported offenders to the civil authorities. Some memorials list those entitled to be placed there; some name persons or "alien clans" not entitled to use of the tomb. Some developers seem to have simply removed or ignored burial markers. Burial plots could be divided, subdivided and sold on, in parts or as a whole, or rented out to help cover the cost of maintenance; profits could be raised from the land by any appropriate means, such as sale of flowers from tomb gardens, but must only be used to repair, improve or maintain the site or its monuments, and not to "profit from death". "Guest burials" were sometimes explicitly forbidden, for fear that they set a precedent of habitual usage prior to claiming perpetual family rights to use of the tomb. There is evidence of severe near-contemporary encroachments, theft of stones and unrepaired damage to tombs, grave markers and epitaphs. Tombs could be lawfully moved – a common result of frequent flooding of cemeteries – after exemption by the pontifices, but they could also gradually decay through neglect, and be lost. Families could move away, or die out. In Pompeii, a legible memorial stone was discovered face-down, reshaped to make seating for a public latrine.

Until the creation of Christian cemeteries at intramural sites of Christian churches and martyrdoms, almost all cemeteries were extramural. John Bodel found that three cemeteries of the Imperial era each had a "peak life" of between 150 and 200 years intensive use, involving perhaps 4 or 5 generations, before they were filled, and their land was repurposed. As cities and towns expanded beyond their original legal and ritual boundaries, formerly intramural cemeteries had to be redefined as "outside the city" with deeds and markers, or their burials moved, releasing much-needed land for public or private use. Among Rome's most disruptive and obtrusive building projects were its aqueducts, whose planning and construction involved extreme care in legal negotiation with landowners and landusers, and avoidance of damage, if possible, to tombs, graves, monuments, chapels and shrines. The emperor Aurelian's expansion of Rome's walled areas skirted these issues by incorporating sacred and religious places into the fabric of his new walls; some strictly unlawful destruction, however, would have been inevitable, and this was officially recognised and compensated. Where private and public interests collided, the law provided for restitution of loss to private parties, but not prevention.

=== Rural villas and estates ===
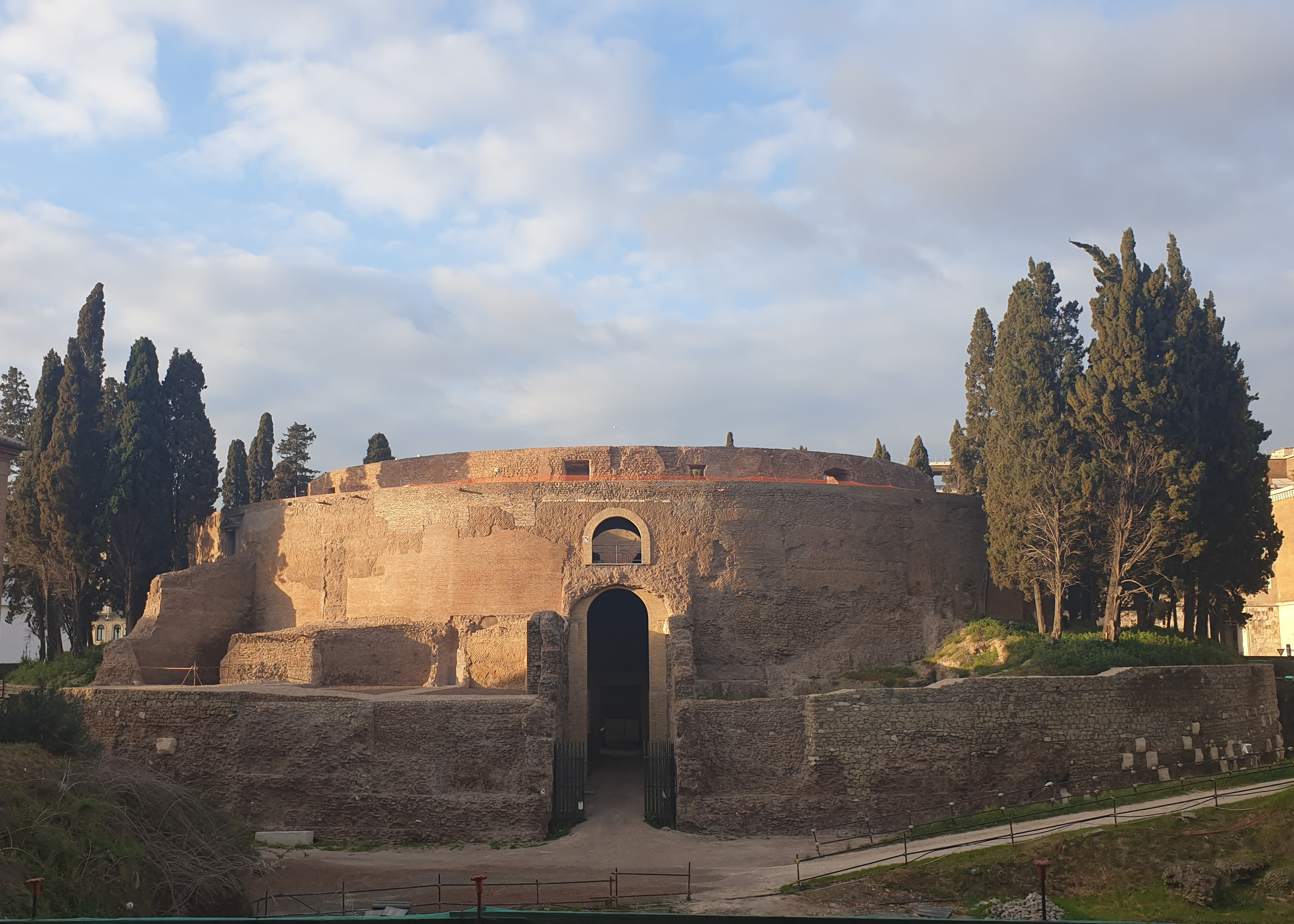
Mausoleum of Augustus, restored

A likely majority of Romans (Hopkins, 1981, calculates 80–90%) spent their entire lives in rural poverty, working on farms and villa estates as tenants, free labourers or slaves. Wealthy landowners used the income from their farms to support town houses, military and political careers, and a lifestyle of cultured leisure (otium). While some affected to despise money, farming was represented as an entirely appropriate, intrinsically noble occupation. By the 2nd century BC, the monumental tombs of aristocrats were a part of the rural and suburban villa landscape, surrounded by tombs of lesser family members, outnumbered by the humbler tombs of the bailiffs, commoner-tenants, and slaves who ran the place. Far from the main roads between towns and cities, the graves of field-workers occupied poor ground not worth the planting or grazing; landowners could offer burial space on their own property for whoever they wished, and wherever they pleased; graves were sacred no matter where. In his capacity as a land surveyor, Siculus Flaccus found that grave markers at the edge of estates were easily mistaken for boundary markers (cippi). Many of the elite chose burial among their ancestors at the family farm and villa, until the emperor Marcus Aurelius banned the practice in an effort to limit the spread of the Antonine Plague (165 to 180 AD). The ban remained in place until at least the 4th century. Heirs might be obliged by the terms of their inheritance to keep their inheritance whole, not sell it piecemeal, and to keep the family name alive; this could be done by leaving the property to freedmen, who adopted the name of the master who freed them. Whoever inherited or bought a property automatically acquired its graves, monuments and resident deities, including its dii Manes and Lares, who were closely associated – at least in popular opinion – with ancestor cult. If the family villa had to be sold, it was not unusual for the contract of sale to maintain the vendor's traditional rights of access to their family tombs, so that they could continue to observe their ancestral and commemorative rites and duties.

=== Common graves ===
A funeral ceremony acceptable to the Roman elite might represent several times the annual income of the average citizen, and an impossibility to the very poor, dependent on charity or an unpredictable day-wage, unable to afford or maintain a burial-club subscription. The social status of the poorest citizens might have been marginally better than a slave, but their prospect of decent burial could be much worse. Some were doubtless unlawfully dumped by their relatives, or by the aediles or rather, by their assistants. Several historical burial crises are known, mostly relating to famines and plagues and the overwhelming of facilities for disposal.

The bodies of the poorest, whether slave or free, could have been consigned to the same dishonourable places as executed criminals deemed obnoxious to the state (noxii). Most are presumed to have been disposed of in pits (puticuli, s.puticulus) like those at the Esquiline, outside the town or city boundary, or at worst dumped into sewers or rivers, and their remains dispersed. For the truly impoverished, and during times of exceptionally high mortality such as famine or epidemic, mass-burials or mass-cremations with minimal or no rites might have been the only realistic option, and as much as the authorities and undertakers could cope with. Some modern scholars perceive this as a sign of apathetic indifference among Rome's poorest in a ferociously competitive society.

=== Basic pit graves ===
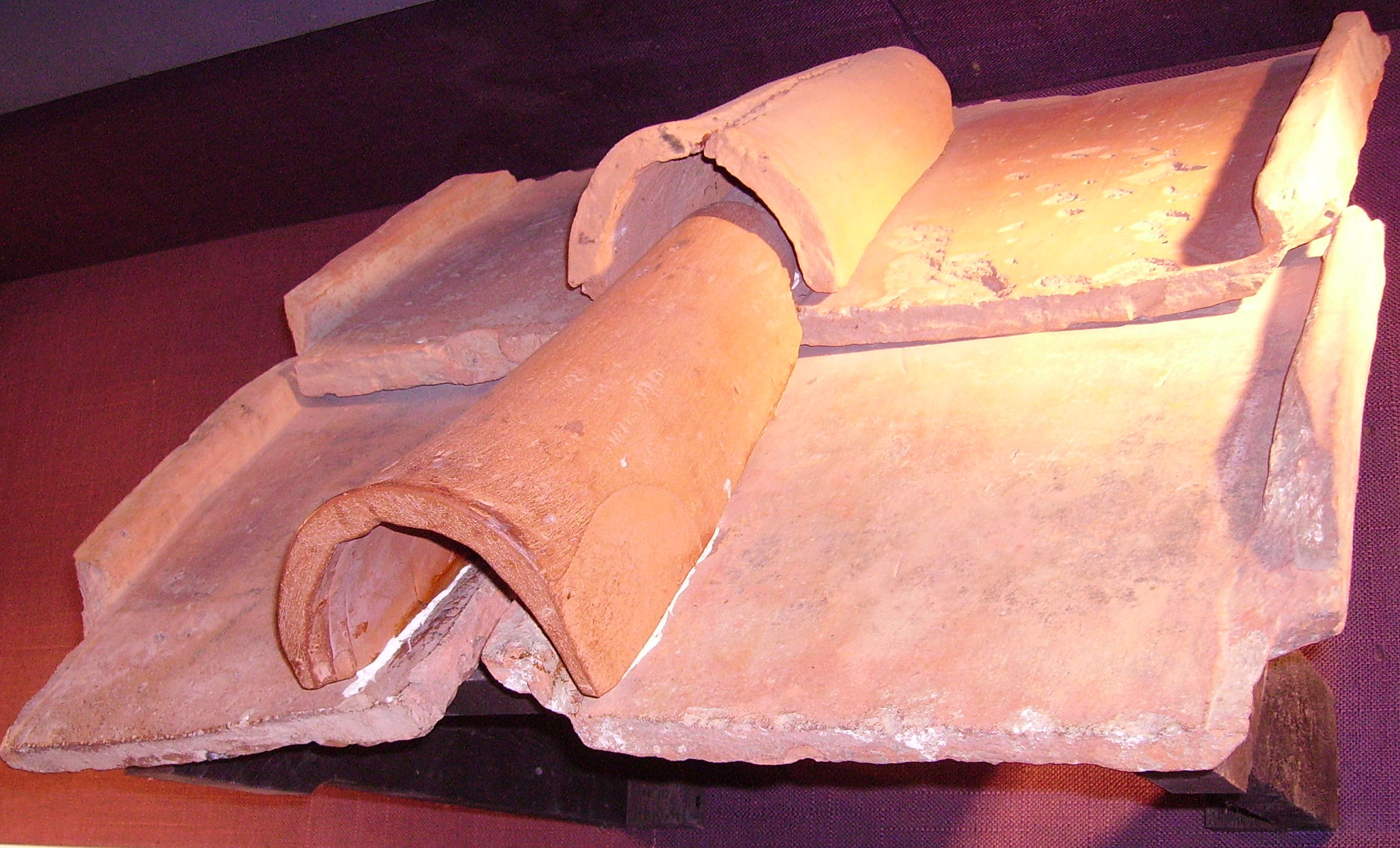
Example of imbrex and tegula flanged roof tiles that were used in "Cappuccina" roofed pit graves. The curved tile is the imbrex.

The least costly form of individual inhumation was the simple pit-grave. It was used, in various forms, throughout the Republic and Empire, especially where there was little or no pressure for burial space. Orientation of the grave was generally east – west, with the head to the east. Flanged tiles (or tegulae) were sometimes used to enclose and protect the remains in a box-like or gabled ceramic tomb, known in modern archaeology as Alla cappuccina ("like a Capuchin monk's hood"). Libations during ceremonies honouring the dead were sometimes given through a tube or funnel that pierced the tomb, and could be stoppered when not in use. Grave goods were often deposited along with the body; a pillow of tufa or wood might be provided for the comfort of the deceased.

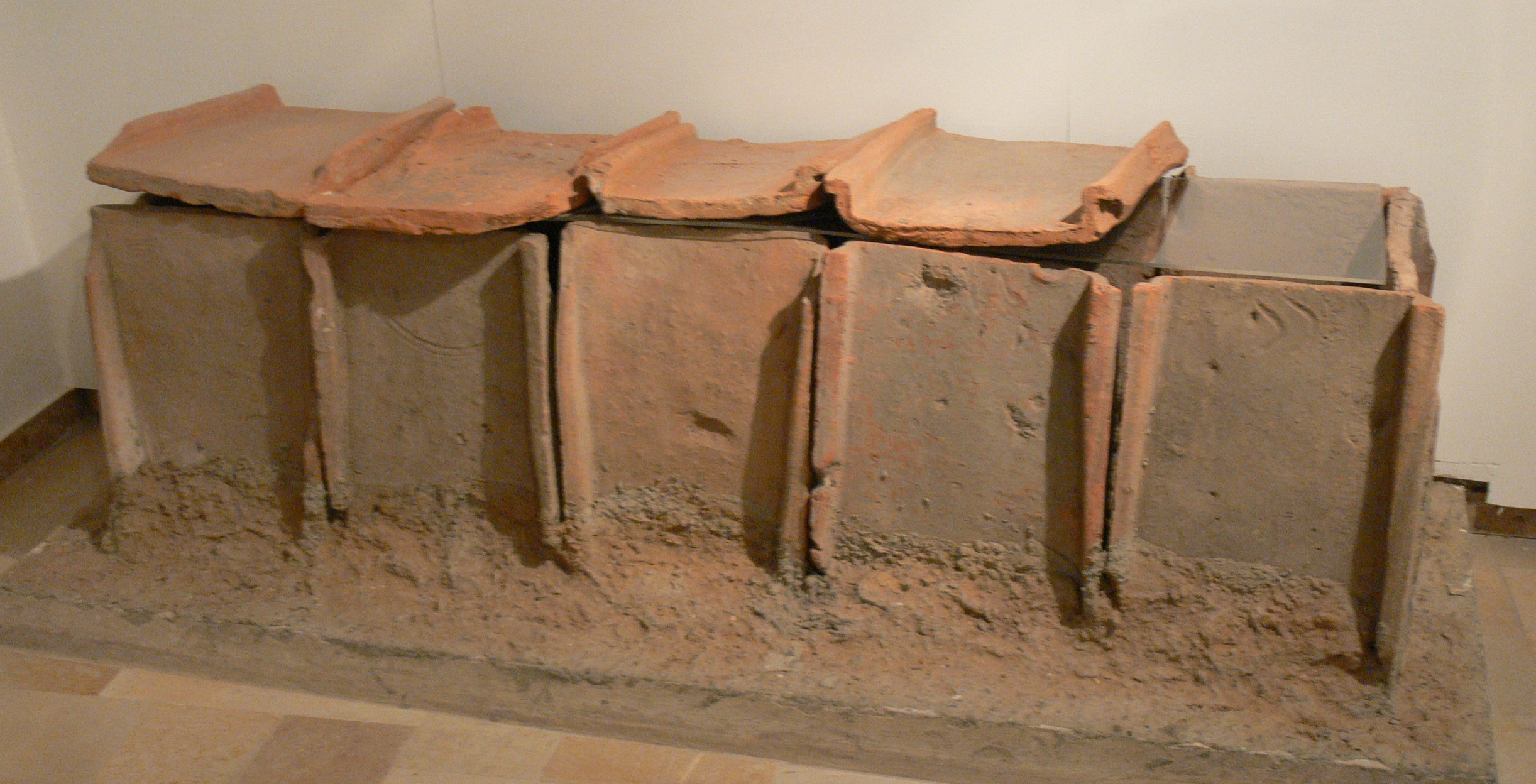
Flat-roofed tomb made from roof-tiles (tegulae), 4th–5th century AD, Enns (Upper Austria). Museum Lauriacum, from the Roman cemetery of Ziegelfeld.

=== House tombs, Columbaria and mausoleums ===
"House tombs" for well-off, prominent but in most cases, probably sub-elite families were often contained within a low-walled exterior precinct, which might include a garden. The exterior of such tombs could be highly decorative, designed to provoke the notice and curiosity of passers-by, rather like the semi-public atria of private town-houses in function, if not appearance. Most had a decorated room for banqueting, complete with shelving, cooking facilities and stone-built banqueting couches or space for couches to be brought in, and either sarcophagi containing the immured dead or cinerary altars or urns containing their ashes. Entry to the inner rooms was likely privileged to family members, most of whom could anticipate their own burial here, rewarding their commitment to care of their departed relatives. Slaves freed by their master's will took on their former owner's family name and many of their family responsibilities. In due course, their own names and epitaphs might be added to those already listed on the tomb frontage, a dynastic history to be read by any passer-by. Most tomb owners made provision in their wills to cover the cost of family banquets and festivals, whose observance would gradually transform the deceased from "polluted body to sanctified ancestor".

The smallest "house tombs" were box-like, masonry structures with perpendicular walls, low-roofed but submerged some feet below ground level and on the inside, high enough to stand in. The walls afforded opportunities for decoration, including small wall-paintings, reliefs and mosaic walls and floors; extra floors could be added at need, above or below ground-level, to contain additional cremation urns, or inhumation burials. In some cases, mosaic floors within house tombs were carefully removed, an additional corpse interred, then the mosaic repaired and the whole resealed, with a "feeding tube" set into the mosaic to provide for the new interment. Some tombs had an entrance lobby and several rooms to store paraphernalia for memorial ceremonies and feasts.

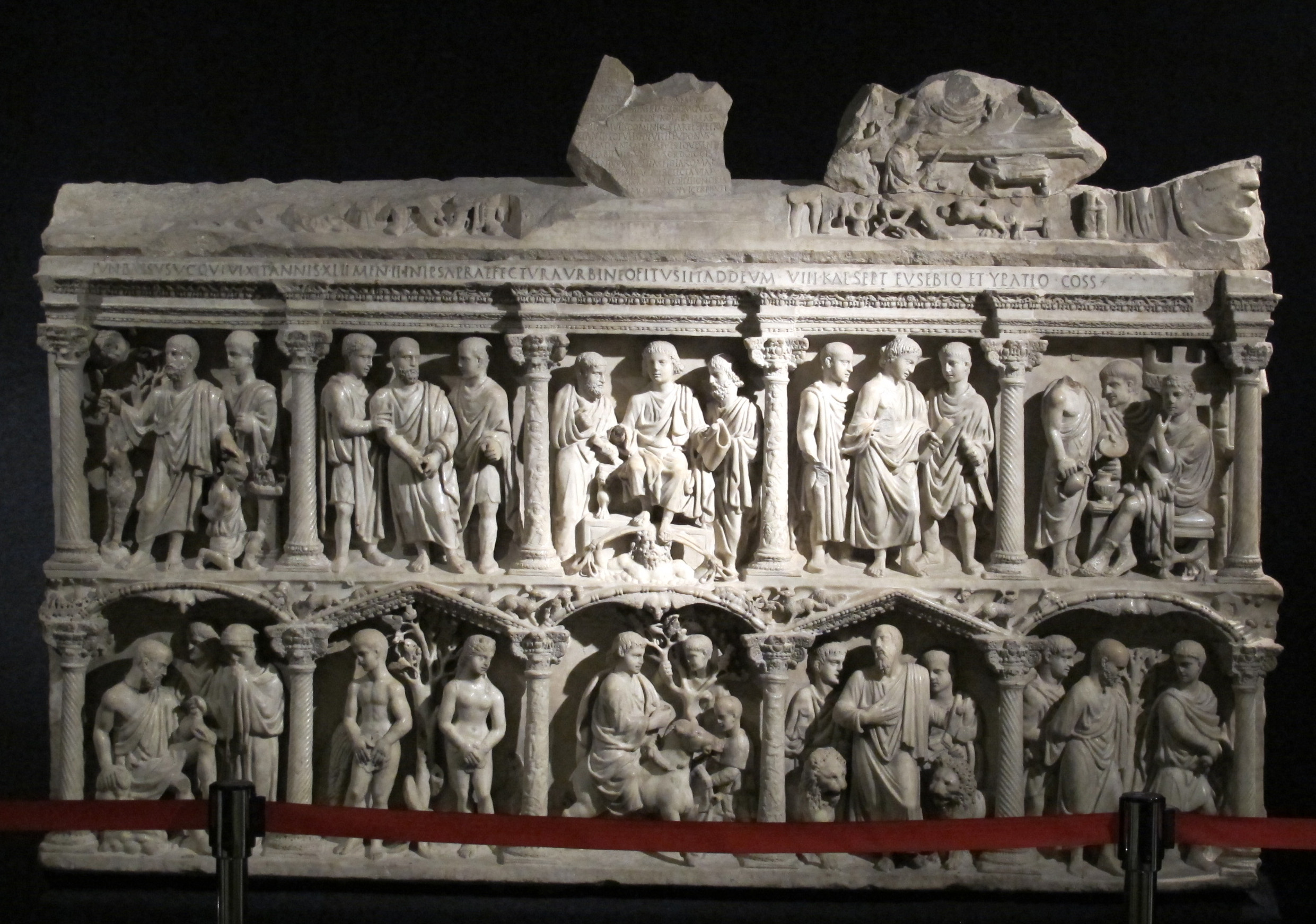
Sarcophagus of Junius Bassus, 4th century AD, an early example of very high status Christian art, with scenes from the Old and New Testaments

Wealthy, prominent families built large, sometimes enormous, mausoleums. The Castel Sant'Angelo by the Vatican, originally the mausoleum of Hadrian, is the best preserved, as it was converted to a fortress. The family Tomb of the Scipios was in an aristocratic cemetery, and in use from the 3rd century BC to the 1st century AD. A grand mausoleum might include surrounding flower gardens, groves, vineyards and orchards as a source of extra income, reception rooms and kitchens for family visits and feasts. Some had small cottages built to house permanent gardeners and caretakers, employed to maintain the tomb complex, prevent thefts (especially of food and drink left there for the deceased), evict any indigent homeless, and protect the dead from disturbance and harm. The bodies of the wealthy deceased were usually inhumed within sarcophagi, but some mausolea include cremation urns. Some late examples combine Christian and traditional "pagan" styles of burial. Many large mausoleums contained indoor crematoria and banks of small, dovecote-like open niches – columbaria – for multiple cremation-urn burials, apparently following a model provided by Etruscan tomb architecture. They were presumably reserved for lower-status family members, or for slaves, freedmen and other dependents. Larger rectangular niches were used for inhumation burials.

The roads from cities were lined with smaller mausolea, such as the Tombs of Via Latina, along the Appian Way. The Tomb of Eurysaces the Baker is a famous and originally very ostentatious tomb in a prime spot just outside Rome's Porta Maggiore, erected for a rich freedman baker around 50–20 BC. The tombs at Petra, in the far east of the Empire are cut into cliffs, some with elaborate facades in the Hellenised "baroque" style of the Imperial period.

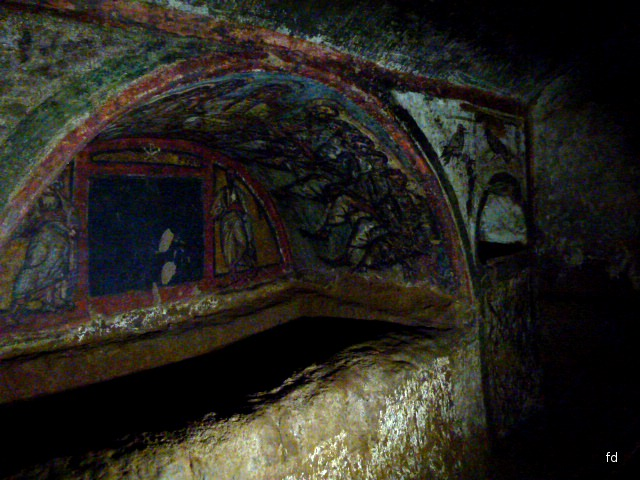
An unoccupied niche in the Catacombs of Domitilla, which were originally commissioned by a Christian family and their allies in the grain trade and bread production. The complex is several miles in length, four levels deep, and contains over 26,000 niches.

The Catacombs of Rome were entirely underground. They were famously used by Christians, but also by all religions, with some specialization, such as special Jewish sections. They are large systems of narrow tunnels in the soft rock below Rome, where niches were sold to the families of the deceased in a very profitable trade. Decoration included paintings, many of which have survived.

In the Christian period, burial near the grave of a famous martyr became desirable, and large funeral halls were opened over such graves, which were often in a catacomb underneath. These contained rows of tombs, but also space for meals for the family, now probably to be seen as agape feasts. Many of the large Roman churches began as funeral halls, which were originally private enterprises; the family of Constantine owned the one over the grave of Saint Agnes of Rome, whose ruins are next to Santa Costanza, originally a Constantinian family mausoleum forming an apse to the hall.

==== Sarcophagi ====
The funerary urns in which the ashes of the cremated were placed were gradually overtaken in popularity by the sarcophagus as inhumation became more common. Particularly in the 2nd–4th centuries, these were often decorated with reliefs that became an important vehicle for Late Roman sculpture. The scenes depicted were drawn from mythology, religious beliefs pertaining to the mysteries, allegories, history, or scenes of hunting or feasting. Many sarcophagi depict Nereids, fantastical sea creatures, and other marine imagery that may allude to the location of the Isles of the Blessed across the sea, with a portrait of the deceased on a seashell. The sarcophagus of a child may show tender representations of family life, Cupids, or children playing. Some tomb inscriptions name infants, and depict episodes from their brief lives on sarcophagi. They are depicted as well-grown children, regardless of their age or context, and never as newborns. They would have thus been included in the family's memorial festivals.

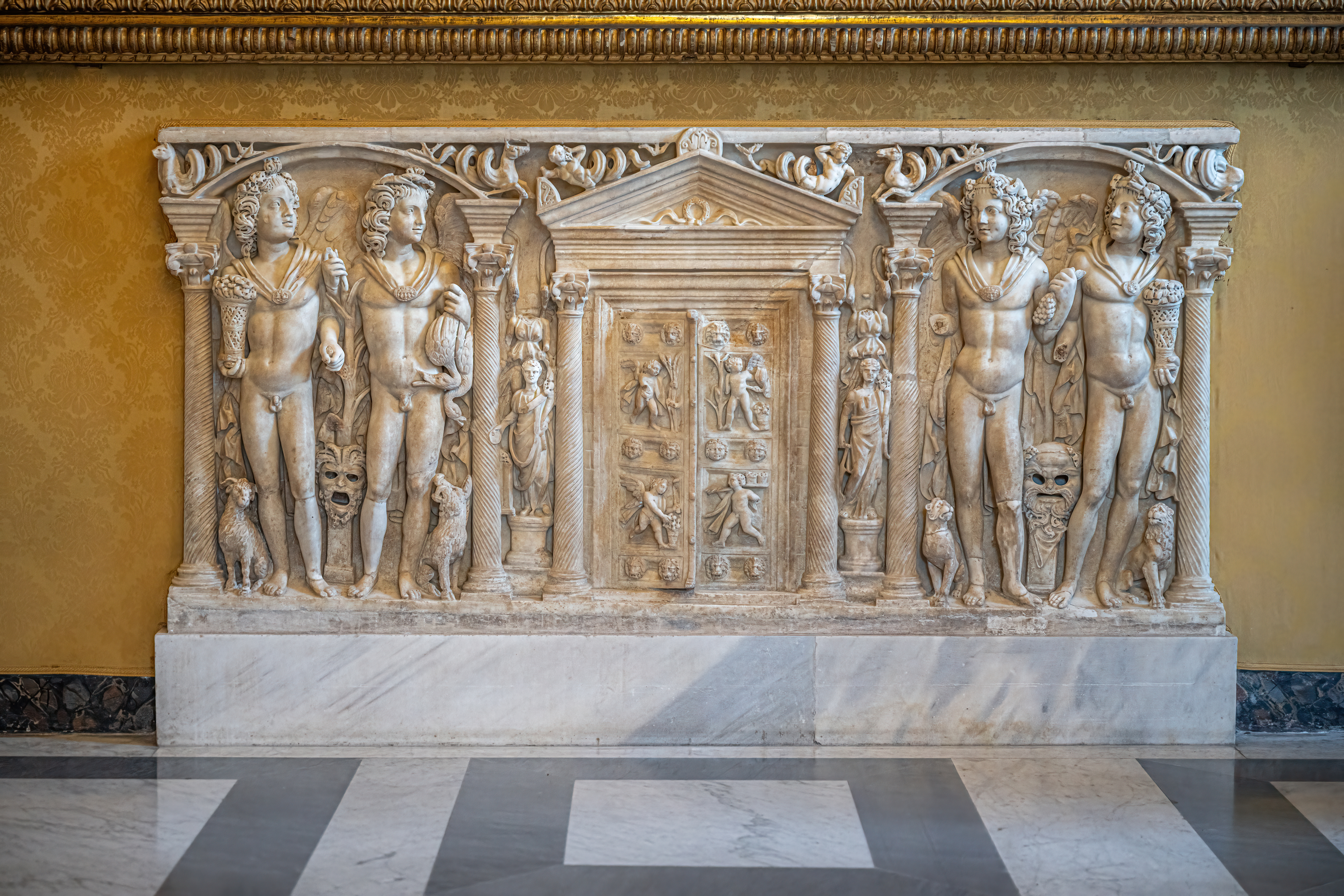
Relief panel from a 3rd-century marble sarcophagus depicting the Four Seasons (Horae) and smaller attendants around a door to the afterlife

Some sarcophagi may have been ordered during the person's life and custom-made to express their beliefs or aesthetics. Most were mass-produced, and if they contained a portrait of the deceased, as many did, with the face of the figure left unfinished until purchase. The carved sarcophagus survived the transition to Christianity, and became the first common location for Christian sculpture, in works like the mid-4th-century Sarcophagus of Junius Bassus.

== Military funerals and burial ==
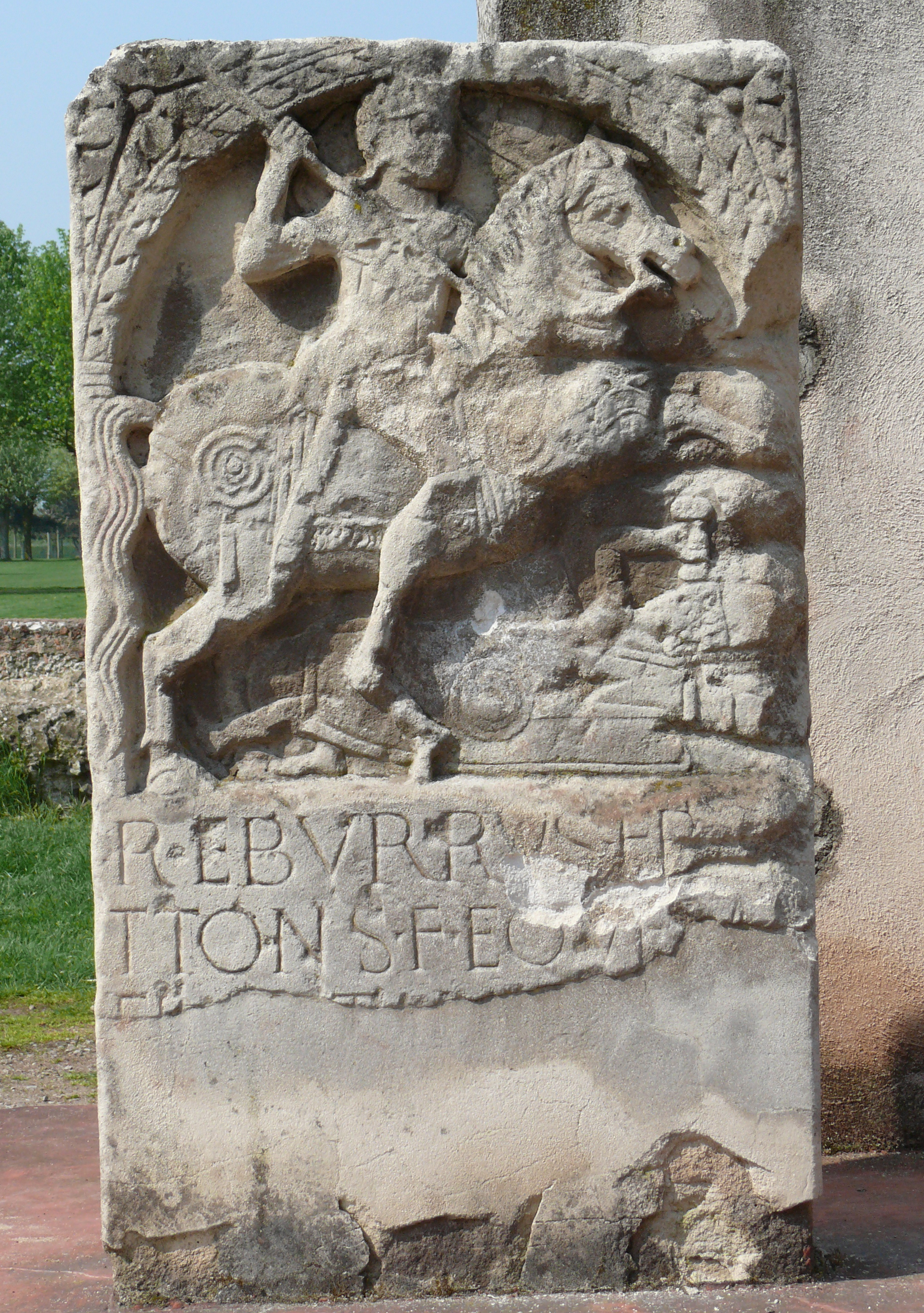
Tombstone of a Germanic cavalryman (1st century AD, Xanten)

"The cult of the dead", it has been noted, "was particularly important to men whose profession exposed them to a premature demise". The Roman value of pietas encompassed the desire of soldiers to honor their fallen comrades, though the conditions of war might interfere with the timely performance of traditional rites. Soldiers killed in battle on foreign soil with ongoing hostilities were probably given a mass cremation or burial. Under less urgent circumstances, they might be cremated individually, and their ashes placed in a vessel for transport to a permanent burial site. When the Roman army under the command of Publius Quinctilius Varus suffered their disastrous defeat at the Battle of Teutoburg Forest in 9 AD, they remained uncommemorated until Germanicus and his troops located the battlefield a few years later and made a funeral mound for their remains.

In the permanent garrisons of the Empire, a portion of each soldier's pay was set aside and pooled for funeral expenses, including the ritual meal, the burial, and commemoration. Soldiers who died of illness or an accident during the normal routines of life would have been given the same rites as in civilian life. The first burial clubs for soldiers were formed under Augustus; burial societies had existed for civilians long before. Veterans might pay into a fund upon leaving the service, ensuring a decent burial.

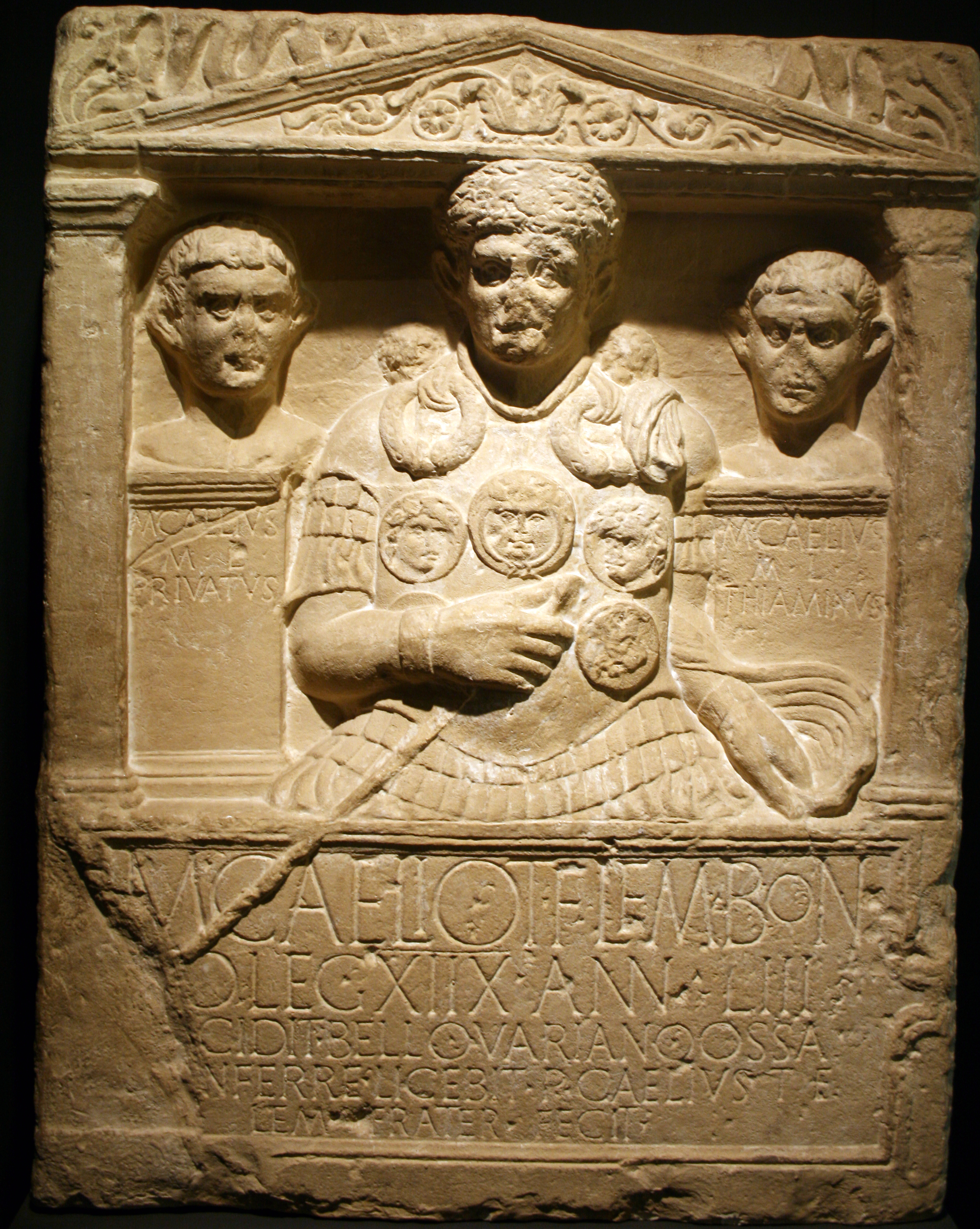
Cenotaph of the Centurion Marcus Caelius, of the 18th legion, flanked by his two freedmen. After an unusually long service of more than 30 years, and an impressive number of military decorations, Marcus Caelus was lost in Varus' defeat at the Battle of the Teutoburg Forest. The inscription grants permission to inter his freedmen's bones at the cenotaph, which was provided by Marcus's brother.

Tombstones and monuments throughout the Empire document military personnel and units stationed at particular camps (castra). If the body could not be recovered, the death could be commemorated with a cenotaph. Epitaphs on Roman military tombstones usually give the soldier's name, his birthplace, rank and unit, age and years of service, and sometimes other information such as the names of his heirs. Some more elaborate monuments depict the deceased, either in his parade regalia or togate to emphasize his citizenship. Cavalrymen are often shown riding over the body of a downtrodden foe, an image interpreted as a symbolic victory over death. Military funeral monuments from Roman Africa take progressively more substantial forms: steles in the 1st century, altars in the 2nd, and cupulas (mounds) in the 3rd. Tombs were often grouped in military cemeteries along the roads that led out of the camp. A centurion might be well-off enough to have a mausoleum built. If a commander was killed in action, the men rode or marched around his pyre, or in some circumstances a cenotaph.

== Afterlife ==
=== Religion ===
Like their Etruscan neighbours, the Romans held a deepseated notion that the individual soul survived death. They went to great lengths to help their dead feel comfortable, and "at home" in the tomb. Several quite different but concurrent beliefs and customs seem to have been held regarding an afterlife. Some epitaphs and sculptural representations suggest that the deceased rested "in the bosom of a kindly Mother Earth". While individual souls were thought to merge into an undifferentiated collective of underworld deities (dii inferii) known as Manes gods, the naming of the deceased as an individual and the provision of grave goods implies that at least some personal qualities, needs and preferences were believed to survive along with the soul, which resided in or with the body or ashes in the dark of the grave, or within the memories of those who mourned their loss. Standard accounts of Roman mythology describe the soul (anima) as immortal and judged at death before a tribunal in the underworld, with those who had done good being sent to the Elysian Fields and those who had done ill sent to Tartarus. It is unclear how ancient, persistent and widely held such beliefs could have been; they seem influenced by Greek mythology and mystery cults. Strict Stoics and Epicurians declared the soul a material quality, drawn at death from its bodily home to rejoin an indistinct universal life-force. Belief in the persistence of an individual soul after death is evident in domestic and ancestor-cult practices that seek to feed, satisfy and sustain the soul as a familiar spirit, still imbued with an identity, personality and preferences, and a tendency to care for those who care for it; a divinised ancestor, rather than just one of a vast and impersonal community of shadowy Manes gods.

The mysteries seem to have promised immortality only for the initiated. Known forms of esoteric religion combined Roman, Egyptian, and Middle Eastern mythology and astrology, describing the progress of its initiates through the regions of the moon, sun, and stars. The uninitiated or virtueless were then left behind, the underworld becoming solely a place of torment. Common depictions of the afterlife of the blessed include rest, a celestial banquet, and the vision of God (Deus or Jupiter). The expected afterlife for the exclusively female initiates in the sacra Cereris (the rites of Ceres, likely based on the Eleusinian Mysteries of Greek Demeter) may have been somewhat different; they were offered "a method of living" and of "dying with better hope", but what this was thought to mean is now lost.

=== Philosophy ===
The mainstream of Roman philosophy, such as the Stoics, advocated contemplation and acceptance of the inevitability of death of all mortals. "It is necessary for some to stay and for others to go, all the while rejoicing with those who are with us, yet not grieving for those departing". To grieve bitterly is to fail to perceive and accept the nature of things. Epictetus encouraged contemplation of one's loved ones as a "jar" or "crystal cup" which might break and be remembered without troubling the spirit, since "you love a mortal, something not your own. It has been given to you for the present, not inseparably nor forever, but like a fig... at a fixed season of the year. If you yearn for it in the winter, you are a fool." There was no real consensus, at least among surviving Roman texts and epitaphs, of what happened to a person after death, nor on the existence of an afterlife. Pliny the Elder in his Naturalis Historia claims that most people are of the opinion that after death one returns to the non-sensing state that occurred before birth but admits, however scornfully, that there are people who believe in the immortality of the soul. Seneca the Younger seems to be less consistent, arguing both sides, indicating that death brings about utter annihilation while also talking about some survival of the spirit after it escapes from the prison of the body. Tacitus at the end of Agricola takes the opposite opinion to Pliny, and claims that the wise believe the spirit does not die with the body, although he may be specifically referring to the pious – which harkens to the mythological idea of Elysium.

== See also ==
- Ancient Egyptian funerary practices
- Ancient Greek funeral and burial practices
- Pile (funerary monument)
- Tomb of the Haterii
- Vostrus Stele

== Sources ==
- Angelucci, Diego E. (1 September 2008). "Geoarchaeological insights from a Roman age incineration feature (ustrinum) at Enconsta de Sant'Ana (Lisbon, Portugal)". Journal of Archaeological Science. 35 (9): 2624–2633. Bibcode:2008JArSc..35.2624A. doi:10.1016/j.jas.2008.04.020. ISSN 0305-4403.
- Bendlin, Andreas, "Associations, funerals, sociality, and Roman law: The collegium of Diana and Antinous in Lanuvium (CIL 14.2112) reconsidered", 2011, academia.org (PDF)
- Berman, Lawrence; Freed, Rita E.; and Doxey, Denise. Arts of Ancient Egypt. p. 193, Museum of Fine Arts Boston, 2003. ISBN 0878466614
- Bodel, John, "Monumental Villas & Villa Monuments", Journal of Roman Archaeology, 10, 1997
- Bodel, John, "Dealing with the Dead: Undertakers, Executions And Potters' Fields", in: Death and Disease in the Ancient City, eds: Hope, Valerie M., and Marshall, Eirean, Routledge Classical Monographs, 2000
- Bodel, John, "The Organization of the Funerary Trade at Puteoli and Cumae," in S. Panciera, ed. Libitina e dintorni (Libitina 3) Rome, 2004
- Bodel, John, "From Columbaria to Catacombs: Collective Burial in Pagan and Christian Rome" in Brink, L., and Green, D., (Editors), Commemorating the Dead, Texts and Artefact in Context, de Gruyter, 2008
- Bodel, John, "The life and death of ancient Roman cemeteries. Living with the dead in imperial Rome" in: Chrystina Häuber, Franz X. Schütz and Gordon M. Winder (editors) Reconstruction and the Historic City: Rome and Abroad - an interdisciplinary approach, Published by Ludwig-Maximilians-Universität München Department für Geographie, 2014
- Bodel, John, "Graveyards and Groves: a study of the Lex Lucerina", American Journal of Ancient History, 11 (1986) [1994]), Cambridge University Press, 2015
- Bodel, John, "Roman Tomb Gardens", Chapter 8 in: W. F. Jashemski†, K. L. Gleason, K. J. Hartswick, and A. Malek eds.,Gardens of the Roman Empire, Cambridge University Press, 2018. doi:10.1017/9781139033022 Gardens of the Roman Empire] Cambridge Core - Journals & Books Online | Cambridge University Press
- Borg, Barbara, "Portraits", January 2012, doi:10.1093/oxfordhb/9780199571451.013.0038: In book The Oxford Handbook of Roman Egypt, pp. 613–629, Publisher: Oxford University Press, Editors: Ch. Riggs
- Brisbane, Tod, "Childbirth in ancient Rome: from traditional folklore to obstetrics", Australian and New Zealand Journal of Obstetrics and Gynaecology, 47, 2, 2007,
- Carroll, Maureen, Spirits of the dead: Roman funerary commemoration in Western Europe (Oxford University Press, 2006),
- Corbeill, Anthony, Nature Embodied: Gesture in Ancient Rome, Princeton University Press, 2004
- Counts, Derek B. (1996). "Regum Externorum Consuetudine: The Nature and Function of Embalming in Rome". Classical Antiquity. 15 (2): 189–202. doi:10.2307/25011039. JSTOR 25011039.
- Crummy, Nina (2010). "Bears and Coins: The Iconography of Protection in Late Roman Infant Burials". Britannia. 41: 37–93. doi:10.1017/S0068113X1000005X. ISSN 0068-113X. JSTOR 41725157. S2CID 162544984.
- Darby Nock, Arthur (October 1932). "Cremation and Burial in the Roman Empire". The Harvard Theological Review. 25 (4): 321–359. doi:10.1017/S0017816000021313. JSTOR 1508378. S2CID 162194875.
- Dasen, Veronique, "Wax and Plaster Memories. Children in Elite and Non-Elite Strategies", in: V. Dasen, Th. Späth (éds), Children, Memory, and Family Identity in Roman Culture, Oxford, Oxford University Press, 2010
- Dasen, Veronique, "Childbirth and Infancy in Greek and Roman Antiquity", in: Rawson, Beryl, (editor), A Companion to Families in the Greek and Roman Worlds, Blackwell, 2011
- Dowling, Melissa Barden, "A Time to Regender: The Transformation of Roman Time," in Time and Uncertainty (Brill, 2004)
- Eden, P.T., "Venus and the Cabbage," Hermes, 91, (1963
- Erker, Darja Šterbenc, "Gender and Roman funeral ritual", pp. 40–60 in Hope, V., Huskinson, J,. (Editors), Memory and Mourning in Ancient Rome, Oxbow, 2011
- Etcheto, Henri, Les Scipions. Famille et pouvoir à Rome à l’époque républicaine, Bordeaux, Ausonius Éditions, 2012
- Flower, Harriet, Ancestor Masks and Aristocratic Power in Roman Culture, Clarendon, Oxford University Press, reprint 2006
- Foutz, Scott David. "Death and the Afterlife in Greco-Roman Religion". Theology WebSite. Archived from the original on 19 August 2000.
- Frier, Bruce W. "Demography", in Alan K. Bowman, Peter Garnsey, and Dominic Rathbone, eds., The Cambridge Ancient History XI: The High Empire, A.D. 70–192
- Graham, Emma-Jayne, The burial of the urban poor in Italy in the late Roman Republic and early Empire. BAR Int. Series 1565. Oxford, Archaeopress, 2006
- Graham, Emma-Jayne in Carol, Maureen, and Rempel, Jane, (Editors), "Living through the dead", Burial and commemoration in the Classical world, Oxbow Books, 2014
- Graham, Emma-Jayne; Sulosky Weaver, Carrie L. and Chamberlain, Andrew T. (2018). "Pars Pro Toto" and Personhood in Roman Cremation Ritual: New Bioarchaeological Evidence for the Rite of "Os Resectum". Bioarchaeology International, 2(4)
- Harris, W, "Child-Exposure in the Roman Empire", in: Journal of Roman Studies, 84, (1994). Published by: Society for the Promotion of Roman Studies
- Hasegawa, K., The ‘Familia Urbana’ during the Early Empire, Oxford, 2005: BAR International Series 1440, cited in Graham, 2006
- Heid, Stefan, "The Romanness of Roman Christianity," in A Companion to Roman Religion (Blackwell, 2000
- Heller, John L., "Burial Customs of the Romans", The Classical Weekly, Vol. 25, No. 24 (2 May 1932), The Johns Hopkins University Press, doi:10.2307/4339101 JSTOR 4339101 Burial Customs of the Romans] (Subscription required, accessed 31 May 2021)
- Henig, Martin (ed), A Handbook of Roman Art, pp. 64–65, Phai–don, 1983, ISBN 0714822140
- Johnson, Mark J., "Pagan-Christian Burial Practices of the Fourth Century: Shared Tombs?", Journal of Early Christian Studies 5 (1997).
- King, Charles, The ancient Roman afterlife: di manes, belief, and the cult of the dead. Austin, Tex.: University of Texas Press, 2020.
- Lavery, Gerard B., "Cicero's Philarchia and Marius," Greece & Rome 18.2 (1971)
- Le Bohec, Yann, The Imperial Roman Army (Routledge, 2001, originally published 1989 in French)
- Lewis, R. G., Aufstieg und Niedergang der römischen Welt (1993), p. 658.
- Morris, Ian, Death-ritual and Social Structure in Classical Antiquity, Cambridge University Press, 1992
- Motto, A. L. (1995, January). Seneca on Death and Immortality. The Classical Journal, 50(4)
- Nuzzo, D. 2000: 'Amulet and burial in late antiquity: some examples from Roman cemeteries', in J. Pearce, M. Millett and M. Struck (eds), Burial, Society and Context in the Roman World, Oxford
- Noy, David, "Building a Roman Funeral Pyre", Antichthon, 34, 2000
- Pilkington, Nathan, "Growing Up Roman: Infant Mortality and Reproductive Development", in: The Journal of Interdisciplinary History, MIT, 44:1 (2013
- Price, T.H. 1978: Kourotrophos: Cults and Representations of the Greek Nursing Deities, Leiden.
- Roncoroni, Patricia, "Interpreting Deposits: Linking Ritual with Economy", in Interpreting deposits: linking ritual with economy; papers on Mediterranean archaeology. Ed. Albert J. Nijboer. Caeculus IV. Groningen: Archaeological Institute, Groningen University, 2001, pp. 101–22.
- Rüpke, Jörg, Religion of the Romans, Polity Press, 2007
- Rüpke, Jörg, ed. A Companion to Roman Religion, Blackwell, 2007.
- Rutgers, Leonard, "Cemeteries and Catacombs", in The Cambridge Companion to Ancient Rome. Ed. Paul Erdkamp. Cambridge University Press, 2013. doi:10.1017/CCO9781139025973.035
- Salzman, Michele Renee, "Religious koine and Religious Dissent," in A Companion to Roman Religion, Blackwell, 2007
- Small, A., Small, C., Abdy, R., De Stefano, A., Giuliani, R., Henig, M., Johnson, K., Kenrick, P., Prowse, Small, A., and Vanderleest, H., "Excavation in the Roman Cemetery at Vagnari, in the Territory of Gravina in Puglia," 2002,Papers of the British School at Rome, Vol. 75 (2007
- Southern, Pat, The Roman Army: A Social and Institutional History (Oxford University Press, 2006)
- Stevens, Susan T. "Charon's Obol and Other Coins in Ancient Funerary Practice." Phoenix, vol. 45, no. 3, 1991, pp. 215–229. JSTOR 1088792. Accessed 17 June 2021.
- Strong, Donald, Roman Art (Yale University Press, 1995, 3rd edition, originally published 1976
- Sumi, Geoffrey S., "Power and Ritual: The Crowd at Clodius' Funeral," Historia 46.1 (1997)
- Suter, Ann, Lament: Studies in the Ancient Mediterranean and Beyond (Oxford University Press, 2008
- Taylor, Rabun, "Aqueduct Planning and the Law", in: Public Needs and Private Pleasures: Water Distribution, the Tiber River, and the Urban Development of Ancient Rome, L'ERMA di BRETSCHNEIDER, 2000
- Toynbee, J.M.C., Death and Burial in the Roman World. Ithaca, N.Y.: Cornell University Press, 1971 (repr. 1996)
- Webster, Graham, The Roman Imperial Army of the First and Second Centuries A.D. (University of Oklahoma Press, 1985, 1998, 3rd edition)
