= EverMoor (game) =

Play-by-mail fantasy role-playing game

- Publishers: Games Adventure
- Years active: ~1990 to unknown
- Genres: Role-playing, medieval fantasy
- Languages: English
- Players: 12
- Playing time: Fixed
- Materials required: Instructions, order sheets, turn results, paper, pencil
- Media type: Play-by-mail or email

EverMoor is a closed-end, computer-moderated, play-by-mail (PBM) game. (Note: In a letter in the May–June 1990 issue of Paper Mayhem, Denise Brush from Games Adventure clarified that the first E and M in the name were capitalized.) It was published by Games Adventure.

== History and development ==
EverMoor was a close-ended, computer-moderated fantasy PBM game. It was published by Games Adventure. John Brush was the designer. Patrice Moriarity provided the artwork. J.W. Akers-Sassaman compared it to Adventurer Kings, Hyborian War, and Legends. Richard L. Smith considered it similar to Alamaze, Earthwood, Epic, and Dark Blades.

== Gameplay ==
The game was set in a medieval fantasy world played on 30×35 hex map. 12 players die for domination. Conquest is central, with economics also a key factor. Players could choose from five races: elf, dwarf, gnome, and human. Victory required "a player ... to convert all enemies to allies or destroy all his enemies", according to Richard L. Smith.

== Reception ==
J.W. Akers-Sassaman reviewed the game in the November 1991 issue of Flagship, stating, "Despite a few flaws, the game is reasonably easy to play, challenging but not too complex, mostly due excellent balance between economic development and military adventurism." Stephen Cummings reviewed the game in a May–June issue of Paper Mayhem, calling it "an incredible game".

== See also ==
- List of play-by-mail games

== Bibliography ==
- Akers-Sassaman, J.W. (November 1991). "EverMoor". Flagship. No. 34. pp. 44–45.
- Cummings, Stephen (May–June 1990). "EverMoor Brings New Life". Paper Mayhem. No. 42. p. 25.
- Editors (March–April 1990). "Meet Patrice Moriarty". Paper Mayhem. No. 41. p. 44.
- Mulady, Kathy (March–April 1990). "EverMoor". Paper Mayhem. No. 41. pp. 41–43.
- Smith, Richard L. (July–August 1990). "EverMoor: Discoveries in a Medieval Fantasy". Paper Mayhem. No. 43. p. 30.
