= 1994 Origins Award winners =

The following are the winners of the 21st annual (1994) Origins Award, presented at Origins 1995:

Category	Winner	Company	Designer(s)
Best Historical Figure Series of 1994	Daimyo Samurai Figures	Reaper Miniatures	Bob Charrette
Best Fantasy or Science Fiction Figure Series of 1994	Advanced Dungeons & Dragons Personalities	Ral Partha Enterprises	James Johnson, Dennis Mize, Jeffrey Wilhelm Kerr
Best Vehicular Series of 1994	BattleTech: Vehicles & 'Mechs	Ral Partha Enterprises	Chris Atkin, James Johnson, Richard Kerr, David Summers, Jeffrey Wilhelm
Best Miniatures Accessory Series of 1994	Mountainscape	Geo-Hex	Kieran Rohan, Daniel Arteaga
Best Miniatures Rules of 1994	Blood Bowl 3rd Edition	Games Workshop	Jervis Johnson
Best Game Accessory of 1994	Legends (for Magic: the Gathering)	Wizards of the Coast	Steve Conard, Robin Herbert
Best Roleplaying Rules of 1994	Castle Falkenstein	R. Talsorian Games	Mike Pondsmith
Best Roleplaying Adventure of 1994	Council of Wyrms (for AD&D)	TSR Inc.	Bill Slavicsek
Best Roleplaying Supplement of 1994	The Encyclopedia Magica, Volume 1 (for AD&D)	TSR Inc.	Slade, Doug Stewart
Best Graphic Presentation of a Roleplaying Game, Adventure, or Supplement of 1994	Planescape Campaign Setting (for AD&D)	TSR Inc.	Sarah Feggestad, Dee Barnett, Dawn Murin, Peggy Cooper, Robh Ruppel, Dana Knutson, Tony DiTerlizzi
Best Pre-20th Century Boardgame of 1994	Roads to Gettysburg	The Avalon Hill Game Company	Joseph M. Balkoski
Best Modern-Day Boardgame of 1994	Australian Rails	Mayfair Games	Peter Bromley
Best Fantasy or Science Fiction Boardgame of 1994	RoboRally	Wizards of the Coast	Richard Garfield, Mike Davis
Best Graphic Presentation of a Boardgame of 1994	RoboRally	Wizards of the Coast	Maria Cabardo, Daniel Gelon, Anson Maddocks, Tom Wanerstrand
Best Card Game of 1994	Illuminati: New World Order	Steve Jackson Games	Steve Jackson
Best New Play-by-Mail Game of 1994	Forgotten Realms	Reality Simulations, Inc.	Paul Brown
Best Play-by-Mail Game of 1994	Illuminati	Flying Buffalo	Draper Kauffman
Best Fantasy or Science Fiction Computer Game of 1994	Doom II	id Software	
Best Military or Strategy Computer Game of 1994	Sim City 2000	Maxis	Fred Haslam, Will Wright, Jenny Martin
Best Game-Related Fiction of 1994	Cthulhu's Heirs, Call of Cthulhu Anthology	Chaosium	Thomas M. K. Stratman, Scott David Aniolowski, Craig Anthony, Arthur William Lloyd Breach, Crispin Burnham, Daniel M. Burrello, Ramsey Campbell, Hugh B. Cave, D. F. Lewis, Gordon Linzner, Victor Milon, Joe Murphy, Gregory Nicoll, Cary G. Osborne, Dan Perez, Robert M. Price, Marella Sands, Charles M. Saplak, Darrell Schweitzer, Jason van Hollander, David Niall Wilson, Michael D. Winkle, T. Winter-Damon
Best Professional Gaming Magazine of 1994	Dragon Magazine	TSR, Inc.	Brian Thomsen, Kim Mohan, Wolfgang Baur, Dale Donovan, Barbara Young, Larry Smith
Best Professional Gaming Magazine of 1994	The Duelist	Wizards of the Coast	Wendy Noritake, Kathryn Haines, Amy Weber
Best Professional Gaming Magazine of 1994	Shadis Magazine	Alderac Entertainment Group	John Zinser, Jolly Blackburn
Best Amateur Adventure Gaming Magazine of 1994	'Mech	Jim Long/AWOL Productions	
Adventure Gaming Hall of Fame	Risk!	Parker Brothers	
Adventure Gaming Hall of Fame	Dragon Magazine	TSR, Inc.	
Adventure Gaming Hall of Fame	Nigel Findley		
Adventure Gaming Hall of Fame	Julie Guthrie		
Adventure Gaming Hall of Fame	Jordan Weisman		
