= Duel II =

Play-by-mail game

- Game logo
- Other names: Duelmasters
- Designers: Ed Schoonover
- Publishers: Reality Simulations
- Years active: 1984
- Genres: gladiator, play-by-mail
- Languages: English
- Players: varies
- Playing time: Fixed
- Materials required: Instructions, order sheets, turn results, paper, pencil
- Media type: Play-by-mail or email
- Synonyms: Duel2
- Website: http://www.reality.com/dmprosp.htm

Duel II (also known as DUEL2), formerly Duelmasters, is a play-by-mail game run by Reality Simulations, Inc. (RSI), where players, called managers, design and run up to five warriors per team against other managers. The game, originally titled Gladiators, and later changed to Duelmasters before settling on its current name of Duel II, has been running since 1984. It has been cited by Greg Lindahl's PBM page as one that is most talked about and has been a standard against which other gladiatorial PBM games have been measured. It is credited with inspiring at least one online gladiator game called Gladiator.

One of the earliest examples of a massively multi-player role playing computer program, Duel II turns feature fight results, a newsletter with standings, personal ads, and team spotlights. Players contribute to newsletters in the form of musings, insults, and fiction. Gameplay alternates between tournaments, held about every 3 months, and the arena, which fights every two weeks. Usually 2 tournaments a year are held 'Face-to-Face' and include reading aloud of fight printouts for championship matches. Face-to-Face tournaments also incorporate alliances as teams to share strategy, tactics, and intelligence. In the 1980s, managers were primarily based in Arizona and California, though the game grew worldwide by word of mouth and through trial tournaments held at major gaming conventions.

== History ==
The game was initially called Gladiators, became Duelmasters as of 1985. In 1985, the game tied with Pellic Quest, Power, and Quest of the Great Jewels for Third Place in the 1st Annual Paper Mayhem Awards for "Best PBM Game". The publisher subsequently changed the name to Duel2, noting that Wizards of the Coast had recently published Duel Masters.

In Duelmasters players create, customize, and manage five gladiators.

The game continues to provide a play-by-mail format which gives managers something to look forward to in the mail. Set in the land of Alastari, Duel II pits managers against each other through their warriors.

== Gameplay ==
Duel II is a game of gladiatorial combat. Players generate five characters, each of which get seventy randomly and 14 player-allocated points among multiple attributes: Constitution, Deftness, Size, Speed, Strength, Will, and Wit. Players also choose a fighting style.

=== Regular arena ===
The game is played by taking the warrior overview and developing a strategy to beat a player's opponents in the arena. These victories give the warrior a chance at glory and give their managers a chance to gloat. There are several factors that go into this.

The turn sheet is the means for submitting the strategy for the warrior(s). Exact format can vary slightly according to what the sheet is intended for, but in general these sheets are half-page documents with printing on both sides. It is up to the individual player to decide whether to fill in both sides or not. The turn sheet requests identifying information for the warrior and the manager first and the strategy second.

The individual strategy consists of selecting weapons, selecting Offensive Efforts (OE), Activity Levels (AL), Kill Desires (KD), Attack Locations, Protect Locations, Offensive Tactics, Defensive Tactics, Armor, Head Protection, Desired Training, Challenges, Avoids, and whether the player wishes an alternate strategy for Challenges, whether the player's or another player's. The player gets twenty-two weapons that can be selected, regardless of whether the warrior is capable of wielding them effectively or not. The OE, AL, and KD are a number between 1 and 10 which the player selects. Attack and Protect Locations are the places where the warrior will try to concentrate their attacks. In the tactics section, warriors can choose to use a tactic for offense or defense or both which will make them concentrate on a particular portion of their overall abilities. The game offers seven types of armor and four choices of head protection, not including the option of fighting with no armor or helmet. Training is either to increase an attribute (except size) or to learn skills. Challenges allow the player to request a fight against up to two specific warriors. Avoids allow the player to request that their warrior not face warriors from up to two specific teams. And in the event that a Challenge goes through, the player may wish to use an alternate strategy and this is what goes on the back of the turn sheet.

A sheet is filled out for each warrior and can have the same or different strategies for each. These are sent to RSI. RSI plugs the information into their game and, on a specified day, they run all of the warriors submitted for that turn. The output of the game is individual fights where warriors using managers' strategies have clashed against other warriors using their managers' strategies. Warriors win or lose and, sometimes, kill or are killed. If the warrior survives, the game determines if the warrior gets their stat train or skills. If the warrior dies, a replacement roll-up is sent to the player to fill the gap from their fallen warrior.

The warrior also gets some new information at this point. These new factors are a recognition rating, a class ranking, and a popularity rating. The recognition rating is a number on the newsletter which is determined by the system based on several factors such as winning or losing the fight, how the player won or lost the fight, killing their opponent, etc. Based on the number of recognition points the warrior has they fall into a class ranking. Class ranking is important because it dictates who the warrior can challenge and be challenged by. The warrior also gains or loses popularity with the spectators, although there is no number that the player can see for this. The player is told at the end of each fight if their warrior increased or decreased in popularity.

All of the warriors who fought that turn are included in a newsletter that is sent to the managers with their fights. The newsletter shows how all the teams and warriors are ranked, gives a spy report summarizing some of the highlights and lowlights of the turn, and also gives a space for managers to taunt, encourage, role-play, or almost anything else. (Please note, RSI reserves the right to delete messages which fall outside of their definition of appropriate.)

Armed with the new newsletter and fights, the managers fill out new turn sheets and the process begins again. Depending on the arena, these turns are run every 14 or 28 days. The company also offers an option of placing the teams on 'maintenance' which means they keep rerunning the strategy submitted each turn without challenges or avoids. Warriors progress until they are qualified to enter Advanced Duel II (AD).

=== Advanced Duel II ===
Once a warrior reaches a certain level of recognition and skill, the Lady Greywand may choose (and always has chosen) to invite the warrior to participate in Advanced Duel II. Once this invitation is made, the warrior gets one final fight in their regular arena and then are transferred into the AD arena chosen by the player. The player can 'retire' the warrior as well, which is the managers' term for no longer running the warrior.

AD has several benefits. Selection bestows immortality to the warrior which means that even being killed will result in their resurrection. The warrior is also given their favorites. Every warrior has a favorite weapon, OE, AL, skill learn, and, sometimes, tactic(s). AD warriors can increase all attributes (except Size) to 25 points. Additionally, warriors now get to face other warriors from across the game, giving the player new opponents.

AD strategies are no different from regular arena strategies in the options available; however, the level of play is viewed by many to increase. Warriors continue to train their skills and attributes to improve the warriors. Recognition ratings and popularity remain the same; however, the classes are new at this level. The official goal of AD warriors is PRIMUS.

=== PRIMUS ===
PRIMUS is the highest level of play for warriors in Duel II at this time. Warriors fighting in PRIMUS gain the ability to learn additional skills and any skills lost due to attribute trains as well as entering a unique ranking format which no longer concentrates on recognition points. In PRIMUS, warriors are ranked from #1 to the lowest warrior and the only way for a warrior to move up is to beat someone above them. The top warrior in PRIMUS is considered the best warrior in Duel II. At least, for a few weeks they are...

=== Tournaments ===
Duel II regularly sponsors tournaments throughout the year. Tournaments allow warriors for every arena to compete against each other. The training in tournaments is only half as effective, but the chances of death are also decreased by half. The basic warriors are grouped according to the number of Fights Experience (FE) they have into Rookies (0 FE), Apprentices (1-4 FE), Initiates (5-10 FE), Adepts (11-20 FE), Champions (21-30 FE), Challengers (31-99 FE). AD warriors are grouped by a system which has not been released to managers, although speculation abounds among managers. The AD classifications are Freshman, AD, Eligibles, Contenders & PRIMUS.

When a tournament is announced, managers are sent mini-overviews which specify what tournament their warriors will be fighting in. This information is based on the warrior's status at the time the mini-overview is printed, so a later fight may change the warrior's status. Changes to the warrior's status occur right up to the tournament, since regular arena fights are run up to the day of the tournament in most cases.

Prizes

The lowest level prize is being classified as a Tournament Victor. Tournament Victors get to make a 'T.V. Challenge' each turn in their regular arena which gets precedence over other challenges. The champion of that class is the Tournament Champion. Tournament Champions get a 'T.C. Challenge' each turn and also fight for free for six months. In addition, the Tournament Champion wins a prize for his manager which is announced at the same time the tournament is announced.

There are several tournament formats:

Mail-in Tournament, Normal

These tournaments have a double or triple elimination format based on strategies which are mailed in to RSI in advance. The player typically can specify an alternate strategy against up to five fighting styles, although they only get to specify one alternate strategy for all of them. After ten rounds, any warrior who is not eliminated is declared a Tournament Victor. After ten rounds, all non-eliminated warriors compete until only one warrior remains and is declared the Tournament Champion. AD is similar with the single exception that all AD warriors are guaranteed five fights. After their fifth fight, all warrior with too many losses are eliminated and the rest continue.

Mail-in Tournament, Fools Format

These tournaments have a triple elimination format, but any warrior who loses their first two fights goes into a Fools Tournament for each class. Play in the regular tournament progresses like a normal mail-in tournament. The Fools Tournament remains a triple elimination tournament; however, the warriors all start at the same point. Remaining through the tenth round still bestows the title of Tournament Victor on those warriors in the Fool's Tournament. AD tournament follows a similar format.

Mail-in Tournament, Tourney of the Dead

These tournaments run like a normal mail-in tournament for 'live' warriors, but another set of basic classes are opened for the dead warriors who wish to compete. In addition to being declared a TV or TC, any warrior who remains in the tournament after the tenth round is resurrected.

Face-To-Face Tournament

These tournaments are double or triple elimination and follow the same format as a normal Mail-in tournament with the exception that the player can actually come to the site where the tournament will be run and submit a new strategy for each round. Managers can also designate proxies to submit changes for them. Face-To-Face's (FTFs) run over a three-day period and are held at different locations approximately every six months.

Bloodgames

Typically run at FTFs, these tournaments are held with ten new warriors for each player in a format where win-loss does not matter as much as slaying the other warriors. The chances of warriors dying increases significantly, making the games... "bloody". These tournaments run ten turns and the three highest ranked warriors of different styles are awarded a free pass to AD. These tournaments can be 'mail-in' format or 'FTF' format. Mail-in format means the player gives each warrior one strategy and the games are run. FTF format means the player can change strategies between fights.

== Goals ==
The game was initially created with the goal of being the 'Duelmaster' in mind, but it has evolved to a point where managers can set numerous goals in their gameplay.

Some of the more common goals include: Get and maintain a winning record, become Duelmaster of the arena, graduate a warrior to Advanced Duel II, graduate a team of warriors to Advanced Duel II, graduate a warrior from each style to Advanced Duel II, win a Tournament Victor status, win a Tournament Champion status, join an alliance and many more.

== Reception ==
Mike Scheid reviewed the game in the May–June 1985 issue of Paper Mayhem Magazine, stating that it is, "without a doubt, the most sophisticated PBM game of individual combat available on the market". Reg Reid reviewed Duelmasters in the July–August 1985 issue of The Space Gamer, summarizing that, "I would say that this game shows promise and is a good value for the money. For those whose tastes run to one-on-one combat and to narrative exposition, I would suggest that it be given a try." In 1987, reviewer John Kelley stated in Paper Mayhem, a magazine for play-by-mail games, that the game had "no peers in its particular PBM genre" and it was "the finest example of individual combat you'll find short of figuring out how to get back to Rome in about 100 A.D.". (Note: Kelly also pointed to an article on Duelmasters strategy in Issue #14 of Paper Mayhem called "Advice for the Green Manager.")

Jim Townsend reviewed Duelmasters in White Wolf #13 (December 1988) and stated that "Fighting in Duelmasters is both simple and complex. Simple in the sense that every blow, parry, dodge, or whatever is listed on its own line for easy reading. Complex in the sense that to become good at the game it will take dozens and dozens of turns, a lot of luck, and much hard work."

== Reviews ==
- Casus Belli #48

== See also ==
- CTF 2187, futuristic robot dueling combat game.
- List of play-by-mail games

== Bibliography ==
- Leffingwell, Ned (September 2017). "Duel2: A Review" (PDF). Suspense and Decision. No. 17. playbymail.net. pp. 34–36.
- Scheid, Mike (May–June 1985). "The Life of a Gladiator: Review of Duelmasters". Paper Mayhem. No. 12. pp. 6–8.
- Townsend, Jim (January–February 1987). "Review: Duelmasters". White Wolf Magazine. No. 12. p. 22.
- Townsend, Jim (July–August 1987). "A Story of the Fates: A Duelmaster Review". Paper Mayhem. No. 25. pp. 6–11.
- Zeleznick, Mark (1994). "Creating a Duelmasters Warrior That Wins". Space Gamer/Fantasy Gamer. No. 8. pp. 75–76.
