= Realms of Fantasy (game) =

Play-by-mail fantasy wargame

- Designers: Computer Campaigns
- Publishers: Australian Wizard (AUS), Computer Campaigns (NZ), Graaf Simulations (US), Pagoda Games (UK)
- Years active: ~1991 to unknown
- Genres: Fantasy wargame
- Languages: English
- Players: 10–50
- Playing time: Fixed
- Materials required: Instructions, order sheets, turn results, paper, pencil
- Media type: Play-by-mail

Realms of Fantasy is a closed-ended, play-by-mail (PBM) fantasy wargame. Designed in 1987 by Computer Campaigns of New Zealand, it was later published by Australian Wizard, Graaf Simulations in the United States, and Pagoda Games in the United Kingdom. In each game, 10 to 50 players role-played wizards vying for supremacy on a hex map that varied in size depending on the number of players. The game featured magic and combat, with diplomacy playing a minor role.

Realms of Fantasy received generally positive reviews in various gaming magazines in the early 1990s, with reviewers praising its value and simplicity.

== History and development ==
Realms of Fantasy was a fantasy PBM wargame. It was designed in 1987 by Computer Campaigns in New Zealand. By 1991, it was published by Australian Wizard. By 1997, it was published in the United Kingdom by Pagoda Games. It was also published in the United States by Graaf Simulations.

== Gameplay ==
Each game involved 10 to 50 players role-playing wizards vying for supremacy. (Note: The average game had 20 players.) Players started with a wizard, a province, and a small force. The game was played on a hex map, with its size varying based on the number of players. Magic and combat were key elements of gameplay, while diplomacy played a minor role.

== Reception ==
Bob Bost reviewed the game in a 1991 issue of Flagship. He stated:

Overall, I enjoy playing Realms of Fantasy, and so will you if you don't expect too much in the way of detailed 'fantasy realism'. It is easy to understand, and provides good entertainment for the cost; like Andon's Kings & Things* and GSI's Earthwood, it offers pleasant fantasy wargaming without frills. People looking for complex economics, grand strategic planning and the like, however, should look elsewhere.

Mark Macagnone reviewed the game in the November–December 1992 issue of Paper Mayhem. He rated it 3.5 out of 5 for the Rule Book and "Fun Index vs. Cost," 3.8 for Game Materials, 4 stars for Player Interaction, Turn Results, and Turn Sheets, 5 stars for Gamemaster Response, and 3.8 stars overall.

Mo Holkar reviewed the game in the May–June 1997 issue of Flagship, stating: "Provided you're not too bothered about diplomacy, if you like low-cost fantasy wargaming, you should like Realms of Fantasy."

== See also ==
- List of play-by-mail games

== Bibliography ==
- Macagnone, Mark (November–December 1992). "Realms of Fantasy". Paper Mayhem. No. 57. pp. 38, 40–43.
- Bost, Bob (April 1991). "Realms of Fantasy". Flagship. No. 31. pp. 38–39.
- Holkar, Mo (May–June 1997). "Realms of Fantasy". Flagship. No. 67. pp. 15–16.
