= State of War =

State of War may refer to:

- State of war, a state of armed conflict between states
- State of War (novel), a 1988 novel by Ninotchka Rosca
- State of War (play-by-mail game), a 1987 play-by-mail game
- State of War (video game), a 2001 video game
- State of War: The Secret History of the CIA and the Bush Administration, a 2006 book by James Risen

== See also ==
- Declaration of war (disambiguation)
