= Epic (play-by-mail game) =

Play-by-mail fantasy game

- Other names: Epic: The King's Game
- Designers: Jim Landes
- Publishers: Midnight Games
- Years active: 1985 to unknown
- Genres: Role-playing, play-by-mail
- Languages: English
- Playing time: unlimited
- Materials required: Instructions, order sheets, turn results, paper, pencil
- Media type: Play-by-mail or email

Epic is a computer-moderated, fantasy play-by-mail (PBM) game.

== Publication history ==
Epic was a computer-moderated, fantasy PBM game. Jim Landes designed the game and moderated it with his wife. Their company was Midnight Games. The game was published in 1985. Flagship editors compared the game to Quest of the Great Jewels, Tribes of Crane, and Earthwood. By 1988 the game was enjoying success in Australia, Great Britain, and the United States. By 1992 a new edition was introduced—Epic: The King's Game.

== Gameplay ==
The Epic world comprised 22,000 provinces of varying types. Players could choose six character types: Arch-Priest, Merchant, Necromancer, Nomad, Warlord, and Wizard. Races were similar to those in Dungeons & Dragons, with additional races such as saurian, maratasen, and dak. Combat, diplomacy, and intrigue were elements of gameplay.

== Reception ==
The editors of Flagship reviewed Epic in 1985, stating that it was "one of the year's more impressive new offerings, and worth a look if you fancy a fantasy wargame". A reviewer in a 1987 issue of Paper Mayhem gave the game a mixed review, noting its quantitative nature and detailed rulebook as a drawback for a fantasy game. John Woods reviewed Epic in a 1989 issue of The Games Machine, stating that it was "one of the best computer-moderated wargames on the market".

In 1988, the game tied for 5th place in Paper Mayhem's Best PBM Game of 1988, along with Crack of Doom and Quest of the Great Jewels. (Note: 1st place in 1988 went to Supernova II, 2nd place went to Hyborian War, and Duelmasters and Alamaze tied for 3rd place.) In 1990, the game tied for 5th place again, with Supernova II, in Paper Mayhem's Best PBM Game of 1990. (Note: 1st place in 1990 went to Legends, 2nd place to The Next Empire, 3rd to Alamaze, and 4th place to Monster Island.) Robert J. Bunker reviewed Epic: The King's Game in 1992, stating it was "enjoyable, well thought-out and supported by one of the most reputable companies in PBM gaming".

== See also ==
- List of play-by-mail games

== Bibliography ==
- Bunker, Robert J. (March–April 1992). "Epic: The King's Game Review". Paper Mayhem. No. 53. pp. 34−35.
- Editors (Autumn 1985). "The Spokesmen Speak: Epic". Flagship. No. 8 (U.S. ed.). pp. 39−40.
- Editors (November–December 1988). "Best PBM Game of 1988". Paper Mayhem. No. 33. p. 2.
- Editors (November–December 1990). "Best PBM Game of 1990". Paper Mayhem. No. 45. p. 2.
- Plunkett, Rex (August–September 1987). "Get Nasty In Epic". D2 Report: The Play-by-Mail Gamer's Reading Companion. No. 13. pp. 37–38.
- Sullivan, Tim (February–March 1988). "From the Helm". D2 Report: The Play-by-Mail Gamer's Reading Companion. No. 15. pp. 29–30.
- Townsend, Jim (July–August 1987). "The Epic Adventures of the Extortion Contortion". Paper Mayhem. No. 25. pp. 27–30.
- Woods, John (October 1989). "PBM Update: Epic Proportions". The Games Machine. No. 23. p. 63.
