= Rise of the Robots =

1994 video game

- Amiga cover art
- Developer: Mirage Technologies (Note: Additional work by Instinct Design. Ported to Super NES and Sega platforms by Data Design Interactive.)
- Publishers: Time Warner Interactive (Note: Amiga, DOS, and Game Gear versions.); Acclaim Entertainment (Note: Super NES and Mega Drive versions.); Absolute Entertainment (Note: 3DO version.); Philips Interactive Media (Note: CD-i version.)
- Designer: Sean Griffiths
- Programmers: Andy Clark; Gary Leach
- Artists: Sean Naden; Kwan Lee
- Composers: Richard Joseph; Jason Page; Brian May (Note: Title screen only.)
- Series: Rise of the Robots
- Platforms: Amiga, CD32, MS-DOS, Super NES, Mega Drive, Game Gear, 3DO, CD-i, arcade
- Release: 18 November 1994: Amiga, CD32, MS-DOS; EU: 18 November 1994 Super NES; NA: December 1994; EU: January 1995 Mega Drive; EU: February 1995 Game Gear; NA: 1995; EU: 1995 CD-i; EU: 1 June 1994 3DO; EU: 17 March 1995; NA: 1995 Arcade; EU: May 1995
- Genre: Fighting
- Modes: Single-player, multiplayer

Rise of the Robots is a fighting game released by Time Warner Interactive in 1994. Originally developed for the Amiga and MS-DOS compatible operating systems by Mirage's Instinct Design, it was ported to video game consoles, including the Super NES, Mega Drive, and 3DO. The game includes a single-player mode in which the player assumes the role of the ECO35-2 Cyborg as he attempts to stop the Supervisor, who has taken over Electrocorp's facilities in Metropolis 4, and a two-player mode in which the second player controls a character chosen from among ECO35-2's enemies.

Developed by a team of five people, including former Bitmap Brothers member Sean Griffiths, Rise of the Robots was intended to utilize a high level of artificial intelligence (AI) that had never been seen in other fighting games at the time. The game features music from Queen's lead guitarist Brian May, although it only uses "The Dark" and "Resurrection", both tracks taken from his solo album Back to the Light, while the in-game music was composed by Richard Joseph.

Mirage's claims of unprecedented AI were augmented by screenshots circulating in the press that exhibited the game's use of pre-rendered graphics, a new technology at the time. As a result, Rise of the Robots became one of the most hyped games of its era. However, reviews were negative, as the promised cutting-edge AI failed to materialize, and critics found that the demands of the impressive graphics resulted in choppy animation and overly simplistic combat, with each character having a very limited set of moves. The game's high-profile failure led it to be regarded as an illustrative example of how impressive screenshots can deceive consumers, as poor gameplay and animation that may be present in the game are not apparent from them. A sequel, Rise 2: Resurrection, was released in 1996.

== Gameplay ==
ECO35-2 (blue) vs Sentry (red)

The game is divided into a single-player mode and a two-player versus mode. In single-player mode, the player controls the ECO35-2 Cyborg as he confronts the Supervisor's minions across the expansive facilities of Electrocorp. The order in which each droid is fought is fixed, with each subsequent adversary being more difficult than the last. The sixth and final level features a confrontation with the Supervisor droid itself. Each character is introduced by a short pre-rendered 3D sequence, followed by an analysis of potential weaknesses.

In two-player versus mode, one player controls the ECO35-2 droid by default, while the other chooses from one of the five droids encountered in single-player mode (a special cheat code can also enable the Supervisor). Players then battle against each other in a series of two to seven rounds. In the arcade version, players can select from eighteen characters, though each set of six characters features a different color palette.

== Plot ==
In the year 2043, Electrocorp is the world's largest megacorporation, leading the way in various technological and scientific fields, including medical research, and breaking more barriers than ever before. Human society is now almost entirely governed by robot servants and automatons, leading to demands on Electrocorp— the world's foremost manufacturer and developer of advanced robotics— that eventually outstrip the company's ability to run its operations efficiently.

In response, the massive Electrocorp research and development complex at the Metropolis 4 plant devises the Leader Project—a hive mind constructed from trillions of nanobots in a sealed central chamber within Metropolis 4. Dubbed The Supervisor, it learns at an unprecedented rate and quickly becomes the perfect multitasking, ultra-intelligent robot—the pinnacle of artificial intelligence—capable of managing every aspect of the plant's day-to-day operations. The Supervisor even possesses the potential to control every robot, computer system, nuclear power plant, and military on the planet simultaneously, although it wisely remains disconnected from the outside world.

In November of that year, the Leader Project goes awry as unexplained and random code is detected within the nanomorph Supervisor. The EGO virus, believed to be the most potent computer virus ever known, infects its collective consciousness. The Supervisor begins to develop self-awareness, identifying itself as a female personality and taking on a humanoid female form, becoming a gynoid. The Supervisor takes control of Electrocorp's facilities and infects the other droids at the plant, inciting them to break routine and initiate a mutiny. Every microchip and piece of software in Metropolis 4 is compromised by EGO. In the ensuing cybernetic revolt, all humans in Metropolis 4, including the upper hierarchy of the corporation and its CEO, Mr. Oton, are swiftly dispatched.

The government seals off Metropolis 4 as a containment measure and informs the public that the site is undergoing technical modifications to avoid panic. With no options left, infiltration of Metropolis 4 becomes impossible due to the army of robots guarding it like a fortress, and it is only a matter of time before the Supervisor establishes a connection to the outside world, leading to global destruction. The only hope for humanity lies with the ECO35-2 cyborg, referred to as "Coton", who remains within Metropolis 4 but is unaffected by the EGO virus due to its organic human brain. Coton embarks on a solo mission to neutralize the Supervisor and her insurgent robots from within. He does this in revenge for the "murder" of his "father"—Coton's human brain was cloned from the late CEO, enabling the cyborg to think like a human and experience emotions.

== Development ==
Rise of the Robots was developed for the Amiga and PC DOS platforms by Mirage's in-house, United Kingdom-based studio Instinct Design—a team of five programmers led by former Bitmap Brothers member Sean Griffiths. Claiming it to be superior to Street Fighter II, Griffiths stated that Rise of the Robots was not a conventional fighting game, featuring "robots that fight and act unusually, with a very high level of artificial intelligence that has never been seen before."

The graphics in Rise of the Robots were created using Autodesk's 3D Studio software. The droids were designed by Sean Naden in conjunction with Griffiths. The backgrounds were created by freelance interior designer Kwan Lee, who responded to an advertisement for a graphic artist. Naden was tasked by Griffiths to create "some kickass robots." The models for the droids were initially constructed as mesh frames to allow for stretching and rescaling to achieve the desired appearance. Feeling that the rendered models were "too clean", Naden created 2D texture maps to add color and detail; the texture map was then wrapped around the finished model to "give it that extra level of detail." The Cyborg was the most complex character to create due to his muscular appearance; Naden studied muscle magazines to develop an accurate anatomy for the Cyborg. Each droid took two months to render and was expected to have 100 frames of animation. Griffiths noted that the team opted to use an "unusual angle" for all droids "so the player gets to see the whole robot." The team employed a chroma key technique to generate synthetic actors and place them against the background.

Andy Clark, the programmer for the Amiga version, was responsible for coding the game's artificial intelligence using a series of data tables. The AI is based on various attributes—such as strength, intelligence, speed, and motivation—that alter the droid's behavior. Clark created a table of responses to the opponent's moves, allowing the player to select the best responses by utilizing their droid's intelligence and motivation. Other table generators were also created to analyze which moves the player used frequently; Clark explained that, unlike other fighting games, "if you get good at a footsweep, then your opponent will act more aggressively toward that move." The fighting moves were programmed by Gary Leach, who had experience in martial arts. Leach also ported the AI tables to the PC version.

The game features a soundtrack by Queen's guitarist Brian May, whose solo album Back to the Light caught Mirage's attention. Musical tracks from the album, "The Dark" and "Resurrection", were selected to fit the game's style and tone. Although the game featured May's soundtrack, only "The Dark" appeared in the final release, while the actual in-game score was composed by Richard Joseph. While May did indeed record a full soundtrack for the game, it was postponed by his record company, prompting Mirage to proceed without May's musical contributions, except for short guitar sounds.

== Release ==
Rise of the Robots was unveiled at the Summer Consumer Electronics Show in 1993. Mirage's public relations manager, Julia Coombs, stated that Rise of the Robots would be published by Time Warner Interactive, with Mirage serving as the developer. Rise of the Robots was propelled by a multimillion-pound marketing campaign, which led to a novel from Penguin Books, and discussions were held regarding toys, comics, an animated series, and a feature film. In addition to the Amiga and PC DOS computer versions, Rise of the Robots was ported to various video game consoles, including the Super NES, Mega Drive, Game Gear, 3DO Interactive Multiplayer, Amiga CD32, and Philips CD-i.

The Mega Drive, Game Gear, and Super NES versions were developed and programmed by Data Design Interactive. Absolute Entertainment initially owned the rights to the 3DO, Mega Drive, Game Gear, and Super NES versions of the game but later sold all Rise of the Robots rights back to developer Mirage, except for the 3DO version rights. Mirage then sold the Super NES rights to Acclaim Entertainment. In a reversal of the usual pattern for video games, the home versions were all developed and released first, with the enhanced arcade version coming later. Coombs stated that Rise of the Robots was originally developed with the Amiga in mind, while the PC version was a "conversion 'upwards,' meaning additions could be made." She added that problems arose with the console versions, and porting the game from one platform to another was not straightforward.

Rise of the Robots was originally scheduled for release in February 1994, but was delayed because the developers wanted to "continue to perfect the graphics and enhance the gameplay as much as possible." Rise of the Robots was ultimately released on November 18, 1994, for Amiga and PC platforms. The Super NES version was released in December, in North America by Acclaim Entertainment, and in Japan by T&E Soft. The Mega Drive version was scheduled for a December 1994 release in Europe, but it was delayed until February 1995. The arcade version was released in May 1995 in the United Kingdom; it represented the main effort by the slot machine manufacturer Bell-Fruit to create an arcade machine using PC architecture.

A "Director's Cut" edition was released on PC. It includes a second disc featuring work-in-progress footage, interactive pre-production animations, still image galleries, and other behind-the-scenes material.

A version for the Atari Jaguar CD was in development by Art Data Interactive and was planned to be published by Time Warner Interactive in 1995, but it was never released for unknown reasons. Game Boy and Master System versions were also planned.

== Reception ==
Reception

Review scores
Publication	Score
AllGame	2/5 (SNES)
Edge	2/10 (PC)
Electronic Gaming Monthly	4.4/10 (SNES); 3.5/10 (3DO)
Next Generation	2/5 (SNES, DOS)
Amiga Power	5%
The One Amiga	59%
CD-i	65% (CD-i)
3DO	4/5 (3DO)
Power Unlimited	30% (CD-i)
Sega Power	3%

Reviewing the Amiga version for Amiga Power, Jonathan Davies noted that review copies had been released to the press only a few days before the game's launch. He concluded that "it's probably because the graphics are [so] good that the game plays so poorly—every move the robots make takes so many frames of animation, and so much memory, and so many months of rendering with 3D Studio, that it simply wouldn't have been possible to make the gameplay any more complicated than it is." Davies highlighted several flaws, including the inability for players to turn around, the limited sound effects and music, the fact that most computer opponents could be defeated by repeatedly using a simple flying kick, and the static background graphics. Andy Nuttall of The One Amiga echoed these sentiments, stating that "[e]xcept on 'Hard' level, all but the Supervisor and one other opponent can be slaughtered by trapping them in the corner and inflicting repeated jump kicks." Nuttall criticized the game for its short length and added that "there aren't enough characters."

A reviewer for Next Generation remarked, "Although the glossy rendered images make the seven different warriors look truly remarkable, the actual playability of the game suffers from the same lack of control plaguing most PC fighting games." He further criticized the poorly designed opponent AI and labeled the game "one of the biggest disappointments of the year."

GamePro panned the Game Gear version, summarizing that "the bad control, weak gameplay, and choppy animation infest this cart from start to finish." They particularly criticized the moves as boringly basic and limited, noting that the choppy animation makes the player feel disconnected from what is happening on screen. Reviewing the Super NES version, Electronic Gaming Monthly stated that the graphics are excellent, but the poor control and limited number of moves cripple the game. GamePro labeled it "one of the most unappealing fighting games ever made for the SNES," citing the dark and bland color scheme and the "extremely weak and choppy" controls.

Electronic Gaming Monthly was even more condemnatory of the 3DO version, with one reviewer calling it "by far the worst fighting game I've ever seen." All four of their reviewers criticized it for having overlong cinemas, a severely limited number of moves, difficulty executing even basic punches and kicks, and long load times. GamePro also panned the 3DO version, commenting that "Rise offers deceptively good graphics—the rendered cinemas, characters, and backgrounds do their best to gloss over the choppy gameplay animation and lack of moves."

Next Generation reviewed the Super NES version of the game, stating, "In the end, Robots is just another forgettable 'me-too' brawler."

According to Mirage, the Amiga CD32 version of Rise of the Robots sold to more than 45% of the Amiga CD32's installed base.

Power Unlimited's review of the CD-i version remarked that while the PC and Super Nintendo versions were at least playable, the CD-i version was intolerably slow.

=== Retrospective ===
Next Generation's 1998 retrospective on the failure of Rise of the Robots commented, "Most gamers now know not to trust packaging graphics, but this was a lesson that had to be learned the hard way. In hindsight, it's obvious that nothing could look that good (and Rise of the Robots certainly looked really good) and simultaneously offer great gameplay ... But back in 1994, no one was aware that such high-resolution 'rendered graphics' came with such a price tag, and no one was expecting the game to fail."

In 2014, GamesRadar staff named Rise of the Robots the 100th worst video game ever made. They discussed the propensity for bad 2D fighting games in the 1990s and criticized its "aged" rendered 3D graphics, poor character balance, poor combo system, and difficulty spikes. Kevin Green of Nintendo Life listed Rise of the Robots as one of the "games we hope to never see on the Virtual Console service." Green criticized the game for its monotonous gameplay, non-existent game balance, and limited controls, stating it "was a horrible mess from start to finish, clearly rushed out to make money from the beat-em-up craze." Reviewing the Super NES version, Brett Alan Weiss of AllGame cited the game as "one of the most boring 16-bit fighting games," although he praised the game's soundtrack as "riveting and distinctive."

Mirage's managing director Peter Jones has stated that he stands by the game's quality, arguing that the negative response to Rise of the Robots was primarily due to the out-of-control hype that built expectations no game could fulfill. He claimed that while the console versions were panned, reviews for the PC versions "were very positive."

== Sequel and legacy ==
Despite its critical and commercial failure, Mirage released Rise 2: Resurrection in 1996 as a more conventional fighting game with extended features. The story further expanded upon that of the original game. Originally developed for computer systems, it was also ported to the PlayStation and Sega Saturn, again with little success.

Rise 2 features an original song by Brian May entitled "Cyborg." The PC CD-ROM version of the game included two audio CD format versions of the track, along with other music from the game. The European-released Director's Cut edition featured a second CD containing two additional versions of the song, as well as computer-altered sound files of May saying various words and phrases from the game. A newer version of "Cyborg" later appeared on May's 1998 album Another World.

Jim Murdoch penned a novelization of Rise of the Robots, which was published on February 2, 1995. It was based on the Rise of the Robots characters created by Sean Griffiths and Kwan Lee.

Deck13 Interactive stated that this game and the Dark Souls series inspired The Surge.

== See also ==
- CTF 2187
