= Kings & Things =

Board game

Original West End Games edition, with cover art by Tom Wham, 1986

Kings & Things is a 4-player fantasy board game designed by Tom Wham and co-published in 1986 by West End Games in North America and Games Workshop in the UK. Other versions of the game include the Kings & Things play-by-mail version in 1987, and a newer edition by Pegasus Spiele and Z-Man Games in 2010.

== Description ==
The emperor of Kadab has died, and the players, representing four nobles, vie to raise armies and build a citadel in order to become the next emperor.

=== Components ===
The West End Games/Games Workshop edition had the following components:

- 48 hex tiles divided into eight types of terrain
- 351 die-cut counters representing various creatures, magic items, special income, treasure and random events
- gold counters in various denominations
- 117 other counters, representing buildings, heroes, cities and villages
- 8 racks to hold counters
- 4 dice
- 16-page rulebook with 4-page pull-out reference section

== Gameplay ==
The players create the playing surface by randomly assembling hex tiles representing various types of terrain to form a map of the fictional continent of Kadab. A player is chosen randomly to start, and follows the eight phases of the turn, followed by each player around the table. When a turn is finished, a new player is randomly chosen to start the next turn.

On their turn, the active player can increase their army, hire special characters to add to their army, play an event, move their armies to explore or attack adjacent tiles, and improve their fortresses. Each time the player enters a new tile, the player possibly draws random counters from a cup (whether to draw or how many to draw based on a die roll), revealing monsters, treasures, or magic items. If monsters are drawn, they must be defeated in order to conquer the tile. If treasure or magic items are drawn, those are added to the player's inventory if the battle is won, and the tile is considered to be conquered. If the player is successful in conquering the tile, then it provides a source of income, which can be used to start improving the player's fortresses until ultimately it becomes a citadel.

On subsequent turns, the player tries to explore and conquer new tiles to provide fresh sources of income.

=== Victory conditions ===
The winner is the player who is the first to complete a citadel and hold it for a full turn.

- If another player conquers the first player's new citadel, the game continues.
- If another player completes a citadel in the same turn as the first player, then play continues until one player owns two citadels, having built one and conquered another.

== Publication history ==
In 1983, Tom Wham designed and produced the artwork for a game titled King of the Tabletop, which was included as a pull-out game in Issue 77 of Dragon. Wham subsequently revised the game, and it was reimplemented as a boxed set titled Kings & Things, published in a bookcase box in 1986 by West End Games in North America and Games Workshop in the UK. The following year, Andon Games released Kings & Things as a play-by-mail (PBM) game.

In 2010, Kings & Things was re-released in a square box by Pegasus Spiele and Z-Man Games, with co-designer credits shared by Tom Wham, Doug Kaufman and Robert J. Kuntz.

== Reception ==
In the October 1986 edition of White Dwarf (Issue 82), Robert Neville was enthusiastic about the game, saying "It's all rather wonderful." Neville admired the high production values, which he called "very flash", and found the rules very straightforward as well as amusing. He concluded that it was "one hell of a great game — fun, easy to pick up and play, but tremendously entertaining no matter how many times you play it."

In the December 1986 edition of Adventurer, Martyn Tetlow thought the rulebook, although lengthy, was "quite straight forward and very entertainingly written." Tetlow did think that random chance was an important factor, commenting "there is plenty of scope for the strategist but luck plays a big role and can knock your plans for six." Tetlow's only complaint was the endgame, which he found laborious, saying, "I found the game a lot of fun up until the closing stages, for if there are two or more citadels on the board, the necessary conflicts can be very time consuming and become rather a grind, which is a shame."

J. Michael Caparula reviewed Kings & Things*: A Fantasy Boardgame with Everything for Different Worlds magazine and stated that "What we have in the end is a great team effort, inspired fancy that has been developed into a tightly-woven game system. Kings & Things* remains one of the best board-game values in the past several years."

In the July–August 1988 edition of Space Gamer/Fantasy Gamer (No. 82), Richard Edwards recommended the game, saying, "If you have four players with gaming time to fill with a wild and crazy game, then by all means spend an evening exploring the world of Kadab. Who knows, you might be the next Emperor."

In the December 1993 edition of Dragon (Issue 200), Allen Varney was not impressed, since he felt that victory was too dependent on random encounters rather than any player interaction. "Players who try just about anything must draw counters from a cup to see what they meet or get. Winners show great skill in counter-drawing and not much else."

== Awards ==
- At the 1987 Origins Awards, Kings & Things was awarded the Charles S. Roberts Award for "Best Fantasy or Science Fiction Game of 1986".
- At the 1989 Origins Awards, the PBM version of Kings & Things by Andon Games was awarded "Best Play-by-Mail Game of 1988".

== Other reviews ==
- Casus Belli No. 35 (Dec 1986)
- Games No. 87
- Envoyer No. 17
