= Bedlam (1996 video game) =

- Developer: Mirage
- Publisher: GT Interactive
- Platforms: MS-DOS, Classic Mac OS, PlayStation, Windows
- Release: WW: 1996
- Genre: Run and gun
- Mode: Single-player

Bedlam is a run and gun video game developed by Mirage and published in 1996 by GT Interactive for MS-DOS, Windows, Classic Mac OS, and PlayStation.

== Gameplay ==
Players use a squad of three huge remote assault tanks (RATs) against mutated creatures known as Biomex.

== Release ==
Bedlam was developed over a two-year period. It previewed under the working title of Mirage, with a version originally intended for the Saturn.

== Reception ==
Reception

Review scores
Publication	Score		
Publication	Macintosh	PC	PS
Computer Games Strategy Plus		3/5	
GameSpot		6.6/10	
Hyper		85%	85%
Next Generation		3/5	
PlayStation Official Magazine – Australia			6/10
PC Zone		89%	
MacHome	2.5/5		
