= Declaration of war (disambiguation) =

A declaration of war is a formal act by which one state announces to war against another.

Declaration of war may also refer to:

- Declaration of War (album), a 1993 album by RaHoWa
- Declaration of War (film), a 2011 French film
- Declaration of War (horse), an American racehorse
- "Declaration of War" (song), a 2008 song by Hadouken!

== See also ==
- State of War (disambiguation)
