= Mirage Technologies (Multimedia) Ltd. =

British video game development company

- Type: Private
- Industry: Video games
- Founded: 1992
- Defunct: 1999
- Headquarters: P.O. Box 202, Congleton, Cheshire, U.K.
- Key people: Peter Jones; Paul Johnson
- Products: Rise of the Robots; Rise 2: Resurrection; Bedlam; The Humans
- Parent: Independent

Mirage Technologies (Multimedia) Ltd, d/b/a Mirage Media, was a privately owned video game developer and publisher based in Congleton, Cheshire, United Kingdom. It was directed by Peter Jones, which continues to operate as a separate company. Mirage Technologies developed games, such as The Humans, Rise of the Robots, Rise 2: Resurrection and Bedlam. In 1999, it was announced the company was closed.

== Games ==
- Ashes of Empire (1992)
- The Humans (1992)
- King's Table: The Legend of Ragnarok (1993)
- World War II: Battles of the South Pacific (1993)
- Rise of the Robots (1994)
- Rise of the Robots: The Director's Cut (1994)
- Bedlam (1996)
- Rise 2: Resurrection (1996)
- Bedlam 2: Absolute Bedlam (1997)
- Theatre of Pain (1997)
- Actua Pool (1999)
