= The Humans (video game) =

1992 video game

- Developer: Imagitec Design
- Publishers: Mirage Technologies; Piko Interactive
- Producers: Martin Hooley; Simon Golding (uncredited)
- Designer: Rodney Humble
- Programmer: David Lincoln
- Artists: Andrew Gilmour; Michael Hanrahan (uncredited)
- Composers: Barry Leitch; Ian Howe
- Platforms: Amiga, CD32, Atari Falcon, Jaguar, Lynx, Game Boy, MS-DOS, Genesis, Super NES
- Release: EU: May 1992
- Genre: Puzzle-platform
- Mode: Single-player

The Humans (Note: Also known as Dinolympics on the Atari Lynx and Evolution: Dino Dudes on the Atari Falcon and Atari Jaguar) is a 1992 puzzle-platform game developed by Imagitec Design and published by Mirage Technologies for the Amiga. It was ported to other home computers and consoles. The goal of the game varies per level but usually revolves around bringing at least one of the player-controlled humans to the designated end area marked by a colored tile. Doing this requires players taking advantage of the tribe's ability to build a ladder and use tools such as spears, torches, wheels, ropes and a witch doctor in later levels.

The Humans was conceived by Rodney Humble during his time working with Imagitec Design as a project for the Atari Lynx spawning a trilogy based upon the human evolution inspired by Psygnosis' 1991 game Lemmings, creating and drawing his ideas before transferring the design work to Imagitec programmers in developing them further, serving as the first game to be published by MicroProse offshoot Mirage, while Atari Corporation liked the title and commissioned two additional conversions for their systems.

The Humans was well received by video game magazines with praise for originality, presentation, and audio upon its initial Amiga launch. Other versions of the game had a more mixed reception from critics and reviewers alike. It was followed by three sequels: The Humans: Insult to Injury in 1992, Humans 3: Evolution - Lost in Time in 1995, and The Humans: Meet the Ancestors! in 2009.

== Gameplay ==
Amiga version screenshot. The Humans' user interface consists of the play area on top and displays of the player's remaining time, choice of actions and remaining tribe members at the bottom.

The Humans is a puzzle game similar to Lemmings whose objective is to manipulate the given number of humans, taking advantage of abilities and tools to achieve the level's goal, usually consisting of finding a certain tool, killing a certain number of dinosaurs or bringing at least one human to the end point, marked by a conspicuous colored tile. Each level is independent of the next, each with its own tools, goal, and set number of humans allowed per level. The only things that carry from level to level are the total number of humans in the player's tribe and the player's total score.

The player controls one human at a time, and may switch between any human at any time. In order to complete a level, it is often necessary to use certain tools or abilities, such as stacking to reach a high ledge. For instance, the spear, a tool obtained in the first level of the game, may be thrown across gaps to other humans, used to jump chasms, thrown to kill dinosaurs or other enemies, or brandished to hold off dinosaurs temporarily. Certain levels also feature NPCs like the pterodactylus that can be ridden in order to reach otherwise unreachable platforms, that cannot be controlled, but can be used to the player's advantage. Several forms of enemy appear and can range from dinosaurs that eat a human if he is unarmed and within its walking range to spear-wielding members of enemy tribes.

There can be up to eight controllable humans in a level, though some levels only allow as few as three. Though there is a preset number of humans allowed per level, there is no limit to how many humans are in the player's tribe. If a human dies, he is replaced by one from the tribe as long as there are humans there to replace him. During the course of the game, the player is given chances to rescue other humans and add them to their tribe. If there are fewer humans in the player's tribe than the minimum required number for any given level, the game is over. Each level, however, has a password that can be used to jump to that particular level from the beginning of the game.

== Development ==
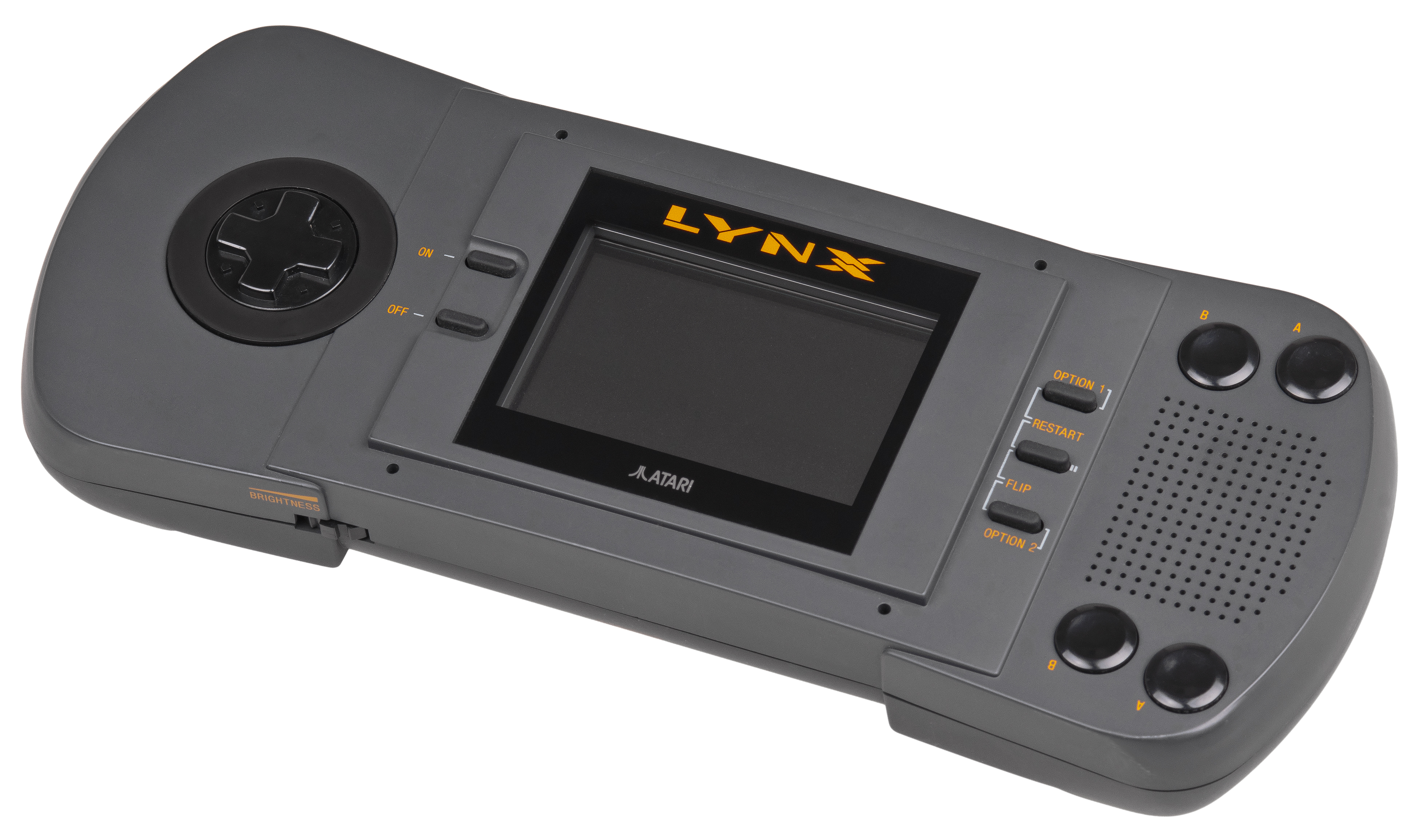
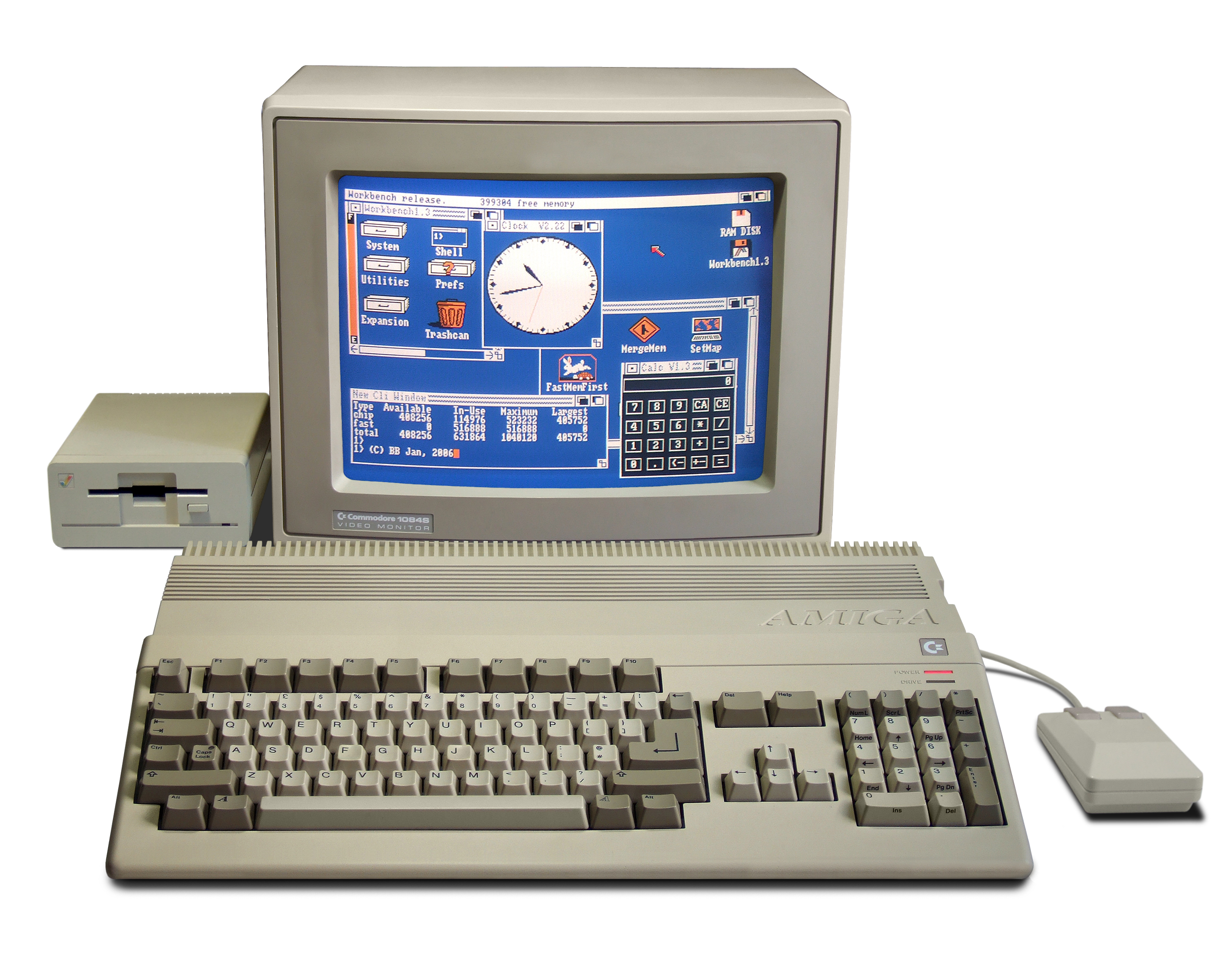
The Humans began its development on the Atari Lynx before moving on to the Amiga and subsequent platforms.

The Humans was the creation of former Imagitec Design designer Rodney Humble during his time working at the company in Dewsbury who, inspired by Psygnosis' Lemmings and its puzzle elements, created and drew his ideas on storyboards before transferring his work to the Imagitec programmers, developing them further into a trilogy based upon human evolution. Coding on the project started in December 1991, with Suspicious Cargo programmer David Lincoln being responsible for the Amiga version, although design work originally started on the Atari Lynx under the working titles Dino Dudes and Dino World. Atari Corporation reportedly liked the game and commissioned Imagitec with two additional conversions for their Atari Falcon and Atari Jaguar platforms respectively.

The Humans' creation process was overseen by co-producers Martin Hooley and Simon Golding, the latter of which oversaw all versions of the game. Golding stated that the production was inspired by Lemmings instead of being "a rip-off" but focusing towards "bigger graphics", a cartoon-esque feeling reminiscent of short films like Tom and Jerry, more varied levels, among other features. Lincoln employed Cross Products' SNASM programming tool to write the code on an editor using a PC before porting it to Amiga for testing. Video game artists Andrew Gilmour and Michael Hanrahan drew the pixel art, while composers Barry Leitch and Ian Howe were responsible for the soundtrack. Other members at Imagitec were also involved in the title's production across every subsequent version released.

== Release ==
The Humans was first launched in Europe for the Amiga in May 1992 by MicroProse offshoot Mirage Technologies, serving as their first title to be published, shortly after Lemmings was released hoping to capitalize the popularity of this style of game. GameTek and Mirage later published the PC version in June 1992 in North America and Europe. Other known commercial ports of the game include: Amiga CD32, Atari Jaguar, Atari Lynx, Atari Falcon, Game Boy, Sega Genesis and Super Nintendo Entertainment System. A Nintendo Switch port featuring three versions of the game (SNES and Game Boy initially, with the Genesis version unlocked once the player completes either of the initial games, even when using a password to start on the last level) was released by Piko Interactive and QUByte Interactive on February 3, 2022. The Jaguar version was included as part of the Atari 50: The Anniversary Celebration compilation for Nintendo Switch, PlayStation 4, Steam, and Xbox One.

=== Cancelled ports ===
Ports of The Humans for both Game Gear and NEC PC-9801 were under development by Imagitec Design, although the latter never materialized. The Game Gear version was reviewed by Sega Pro magazine in their May 1993 issue, obtaining a 75 out of 100 score, but ultimately went unreleased for unknown reasons.

== Reception ==
Reception

Review scores
Publication	Score	
Publication	Amiga	Sega Genesis
Amiga Action	92%	N/A
Amiga Computing	92%	N/A
Amiga Format	72%	N/A
Amiga Power	70%	N/A
Amiga User International	91%	N/A
Electronic Gaming Monthly	N/A	7/10, 7/10,7/10, 6/10
GameFan	N/A	70%, 74%, 72%, 69%
VideoGames & Computer Entertainment	N/A	6/10
Amiga Mania	93%	N/A
CU Amiga	84%	N/A
Mega	N/A	81%
Mega Action	N/A	71%
Mega Drive Advanced Gaming	N/A	80%
MegaTech	N/A	76/100
The One Amiga	80%	N/A
Sega Force	N/A	83/100
Sega Power	N/A	88%
Sega Pro	N/A	86%
Sega Zone	N/A	68/100

The Humans garnered generally favorable reception from critics. Amiga Mania's Ashley Cotter-Cairn lauded the game for its cleverly designed level puzzles, excellent graphics, crisp sound, and addictive factor.

The Sega Genesis version also received generally favorable reviews. GamePro's Marvin Kubeczech highlighted the caveman's antics, particularly the illustrations of each new tool acquired, and the audio-visual department, but noted that the game's controls take time getting used to. Electronic Gaming Monthly's four editors commended the game's take on the Lemmings formula and the high level of challenge in later levels, but found its slow pace aggravating, especially since a single mistake can force an entire level to be restarted.

The MS-DOS version was also generally well received. Electronic Games' Ed Dille felt that the game's combination of keyboard and joystick interfaces, although unusual at first, created good gameplay mechanics and singled out its originality. AllGame's Michael L. House praised the game for its fun graphics, soundtrack, and replay value, but noted that some of the puzzles were devilishly designed and criticized the lack of unique sound effects. Computer Gaming World's Chuck Miller found the game charming and liked the background music, but felt that the limited color palette of its visuals was more like that of a console title than a PC product, and that the difficulty increases too quickly. David Sears of Game Players PC Entertainment considered it a very playable game, commending its soundtrack and the fluid animation of the humans, but expressed mixed thoughts regarding the overall graphical presentation and felt that it borrowed heavily from Lemmings. VideoGames & Computer Entertainment's David N. Eadington proclaimed that "Lemmings succeeded largely because it combined constant action with solid puzzles; the lack of speed and the repetitiveness of The Humans should limit its appeal".

=== Nintendo ===
Reception (Nintendo)

Review scores
Publication	Score	
Publication	Game Boy	SNES
Computer and Video Games	N/A	71/100
GamesMaster	N/A	64/100
Official Nintendo Magazine	74/100	N/A
Super Play	N/A	70%
Total!	(UK) 60% (DE) 2-	(UK) 72% (DE) 2
Games World	N/A	60/100
Go! Hand-Held Video Games	72/100	N/A
N-Force	86/100	N/A
Nintendo Game Zone	44/100	58/100
Super Action	N/A	81%
Super Control	N/A	68%
Super Gamer	N/A	45/100

The Game Boy version was met with average reception.

The Super NES version also received average reviews.

=== Atari ===
Reception (Atari)

Review scores
Publication	Score	
Publication	Atari Jaguar	Atari Lynx
Electronic Gaming Monthly	7/10, 7/10, 6/10, 6/10, 6/10	6/10, 7/10, 6/10, 6/10
GameFan	85%, 84%, 85%, 82%	N/A
GamesMaster	N/A	80%
Hyper	62/100	N/A
IGN	N/A	7/10
ST Format	78%	N/A
ST Review	81%	N/A
Atari ST User	89%	N/A
Bad Influence!	N/A	4/5
Electronic Games	90%	N/A
Game Zero Magazine	N/A	85/100
Game Zone	N/A	87/100
Games World	64/100	N/A
Go! Hand-Held Video Games	N/A	77/100
VideoGames	5/10	N/A

The Atari Lynx version was received favorably. GamePro's Weekend Warrior found it to be a captivating puzzle game, adding that the quirky graphics and upbeat soundtrack belie its complexity and challenge.

The Atari Jaguar version was met with average critical sentiments. Electronic Gaming Monthly's Mike Weigand said that the Jaguar version was fine, with decent graphics and adequate controls. GamePro's Boss Music rated as it one of the better Jaguar titles due to its "brain-twisting" gameplay, but found it graphically lacking considering the Jaguar's capabilities and criticized the stiff controls and lack of multiplayer modes. According to internal documentation from Atari, the Jaguar version had sold 18,771 copies by April 1, 1995.

The Atari Falcon version was generally well received. Paula Richards and Frank Charlton of ST Format highlighted the game's overall graphical department, addictive gameplay, and humor, but criticized it for its tiresome repetitiveness and steep difficulty curve in later levels. Atari World's Nial Grimes praised the Falcon version for being a "perfect" conversion of the Jaguar version, but questioned the game's long-term playability, stating that it would take a special kind of person to play it from start to finish. Kay Tennemann of German publication ST-Computer commended the Falcon version for its overall visual presentation, but faulted its soundscapes for being lacking. Tristan Collet of the French ST Magazine gave the Falcon version positive remarks for its engaging gameplay, good longevity, and humour, but criticized its overall technical performance.

== Legacy ==
Following the success of The Humans, a sequel titled The Humans: Insult to Injury was launched in 1992 as both a stand-alone release or as an expansion pack. In 1993, the two games were combined and released for both Amiga CD32 and PC under the name Humans 1 and 2. In 1995, a third entry in the series titled Humans 3: Evolution - Lost in Time was released, keeping to the original game idea but differs from the original entry in storyline, gameplay style, and level continuity. Between 1994 and 2001, the trademarks for the Atari Jaguar version were abandoned and cancelled respectively. About a decade after GameTek declared bankruptcy, Deep Silver released a fourth entry for Microsoft Windows and Nintendo DS under the name The Humans: Meet the Ancestors!, retaining the same general gameplay style but improved the graphics and added more interactive objects and enemies.
