= Rise 2: Resurrection =

1996 video game

- European MS-DOS cover art
- Developer: Mirage
- Publisher: Acclaim Entertainment
- Designers: Sean Naden; Jason Swift Clowes
- Artists: Sean Naden; Kwan Lee
- Composers: Tom Grimshaw; Brian May
- Series: Rise of the Robots
- Platforms: PlayStation, Saturn, MS-DOS
- Release: MS-DOS: NA: March 1996; EU: April 1996; PlayStation: NA: March 5, 1996; EU: April 19, 1996; Saturn: EU: April 19, 1996; NA: 1996
- Genre: Fighting
- Modes: Single player, multiplayer

Rise 2: Resurrection is a fighting game developed by Mirage Media and published by Acclaim Entertainment in 1996. The game is a sequel to Rise of the Robots, and improves on the first game's graphics, rendering, and animation; hits give off metal scraps and electrical arcs progressively run over the bodies of damaged robots.

The in-game music features hard-rock themed music by Tom Grimshaw at Mirage, and a theme by Queen's guitarist Brian May entitled "Cyborg".

== Gameplay ==
A fight between Loader (yellow) and Griller (green).

Unlike its predecessor, Resurrection allows the players to control any robot, both in one and two-player mode. Players can choose from 256 different palette rotations for each robot. There are six different types of projectiles available to each robot.

The game features a far broader fighting experience than its predecessor. Each robot has its own original moves, death moves which are called E-X-E-C-U-T-E-D, the ability to steal and use a defeated robot projectile, and a devastating super move that can be used when the power bar is full, similar to other fighting games of the time. The game also features a combo counter system, named Chaos. The controls are standard for a fighting game, and non-humanoid robots adapt their moves to the punch/kick model.

In one-player mode, the player faces each robot in its own rendered and raytraced stage, while two-player mode allows the player to either choose the stage or to leave it at random. Each stage is graphically tuned to its corresponding robot, and some stages feature traps that players can use to gain an advantage against their opponent. The traps also tend to match their owner robot's characteristics: as the stage for Steppenwolf, the gun-wielding robot, features a trap that fires bullets, and the stage for Vandal, the saw-wielding robot, features a trap with a saw. Unlike the previous game, Rise 2: Resurrection does not have character-specific endings, as the player will earn the same ending regardless of the characters they used to complete Arcade Mode.

== Plot ==
The cyborg Coton from Rise of the Robots defeated his opponents and faced the Supervisor, who used her morphing ability to defeat him and assimilate him into her own consciousness. Coton's thought patterns were cloned and used to bolster the artificial intelligence of the Supervisor, who used fragments of his consciousness in selected robots to imbue them with the ability to improve upon their own design.

Electrocorp scientists, fearing that Coton had been defeated and that the Supervisor would now target the city, prepared a counter-virus based on EGO from the information Coton had earlier sent them. The Anarchy Virus was released to the main building of Electrocorp, and it infected most of the robots previously under Supervisor's control - the robots waged war against each other, disconnecting from the neuronet, quickly depleting the numbers of the Supervisor's army. Coton used the distraction caused by the malfunctioning robots to upload his consciousness to another robot, and prepared to either escape the Electrocorp building or to attempt another attack on the Supervisor.

At this point, the story ends, and it is left open-ended - and dependent on the player's ability - whether Coton is successful in either attempt. The uploaded Coton's consciousness of any robots who defeats the Supervisor, it will only have one ending, as they destroy the Supervisor, destroy the Anarchy virus and then destroy the Electrocorp buildings.

== Characters ==
The game features eighteen standard characters and ten hidden characters. The hidden characters tend to be stronger than the other ones, and some are very easy to unlock while others are much harder. Eight of the hidden characters are clones of the standard characters with similar moves and different graphics.

The seven robots (including the hidden character Supervisor) of the original game return with new graphics and moves, and aside from the original Rook, all have an offspring modified robot. All robots also get one projectile they can use from a distance, and all five projectiles have a different range, speed, and reach.

== Release ==
=== Director's Cut ===
An updated version of Rise 2: Resurrection for the PC, titled Rise 2: Resurrection: Director's Cut, was released in September 1996. The Director's Cut version features 2 additional hidden characters, Sheepman and Bunnyrabbit. An extra CD contains a novel, extra music tracks, voices, footage on the making of the game, and the actual game has a number of new backgrounds.

== Reception ==
Reception

Review scores
Publication	Score
AllGame	4/5 (PS)
GameSpot	5.1/10 (PC)
IGN	2/10 (PS)
Next Generation	1/5 (PS); 1/5 (SAT)

Rise 2: Resurrection was met with generally negative reviews. IGN gave the PlayStation version 2/10, declaring that "The original 16-bit Rise of the Robots was possibly one of the worst fighters ever made. That is, until Rise 2 was released." They cited the game's poor controls and outdated graphics as reasons for this statement. GameSpot gave the PC version a 5.1/10, saying that the graphics, music, sound effects, variety of characters, and overall atmosphere of the game are all excellent, but that the moves are awkward and difficult to perform, making the game no more than "an expensive screensaver". Next Generation did not bother to review any version of the game until their end-of-1996 overview of the Saturn and PlayStation libraries. They gave both these versions 1 out of 5 stars, saying the game is a step down from the already exceptionally poor original Rise of the Robots.
