= State of War (play-by-mail game) =

Play-by-mail wargame

- Publishers: Game Systems, Inc.
- Years active: 1987 to unknown
- Genres: Role-playing, wargame
- Languages: English
- Players: 20
- Playing time: Fixed
- Materials required: Instructions, order sheets, turn results, paper, pencil
- Media type: Play-by-mail or email

State of War is a closed-end, computer-moderated, play-by-mail (PBM) wargame. It was published by Game Systems, Inc.

== History and development ==
State of War was a computer moderated PBM game published by Game Systems, Inc. After three years of development, the game launched in January 1987. In 1988, KJC Games launched the game in the United Kingdom with a limited run of 500 available positions. The game was moderately complex.

== Gameplay ==
The game is closed-ended with players striving for the most victory points. The setting is a futuristic North America. Gameplay takes place in a crisis period after nuclear war in Europe. Twenty players led states with gameplay occurring on a hex map. Combat, diplomacy, and economics were elements of gameplay. Victory points could be achieved through a variety of methods. One player compared it to the game Earthwood. Victory could come individually (the most victory points) or through an alliance by meeting multiple conditions.

== Reception ==
Stewart Wieck reviewed the game in a 1998 issue of White Wolf, stating that it was a, "good, solid, and well-programmed game," and "A good game on which to cut your PBM teeth." He rated it a 7 of 10 for Materials and Game Moderation, an 8 for Diplomacy, and a 9 for Strategy. Overall he rated the game at 8 of 10 points. Tim Sullivan reviewed the game in a 1988 issue of The D2 Report, calling it a "high-energy, modern day wargame".

== See also ==
- List of play-by-mail games

== Bibliography ==
- Cale, Terry (Winter 1986). "State of War". Flagship. No. 17 (U.S. ed.). pp. 19–22.
- Game Systems, Inc. (March–April 1986). "State of War (is now a reality)". Paper Mayhem. No. 17. p. 44.
- Kavanaugh, Brendon (July 1988). "1988 Game Launches: State of War". Crash. No. 54.
- Lacey, Ian (January 1989). "PBM Take-Overs: State of War". Crash. No. 60.
- Sullivan, Tim (February–March 1988). "From the Helm: State of War". The D2 Report. No. 16. p. 30.
- Wieck, Stewart (1998). "The PBM Reviews: State of War". White Wolf Magazine. No. 10. pp. 61–62.
