= Forgotten Realms (play-by-mail game) =

Play-by-mail game

- Designers: Paul Brown
- Publishers: Reality Simulations, Inc.
- Years active: ~1994 to current
- Genres: Role-playing, heroic fantasy
- Languages: English
- Players: 50
- Playing time: fixed (30–50 turns)
- Materials required: Instructions, order sheets, turn results, paper, pencil
- Media type: Play-by-mail or email

Forgotten Realms, subtitled "War of the Avatars", was a computer-moderated play-by-mail game (PBM) published by Reality Simulations that was set in the Savage Frontier of the Forgotten Realms.

== Development ==
The game was designed by Paul Brown.

== Gameplay ==
50 players per game adventured in a world comprising 5,000 hexagons of varied terrain, where they controlled various characters, military forces, and communities. Diplomacy and combat were important parts of gameplay. The company published a "top-10 chart" every turn to highlight significant realm accomplishments.

Each game lasted until one of the players met the victory conditions, usually 35–50 turns, at a cost of $1.50 per turn plus 50 cents for each move (to a maximum, of $15 per turn.) After twenty turns, players could summon a god's avatar to aid them.

== Reception ==
Kuo W. Ping reviewed the game in the July–August 1996 issue of Paper Mayhem magazine and stated it was "one of the best PBM games I have yet played". Ping described the game as "very fun and enjoyable" and rated it with "high marks" while suggesting two areas to improve.

== Awards ==
Forgotten Realms won the Origins Award for Best New Play-by-Mail Game of 1994.
