= CTF 2187 =

Fantasy role-playing game

- Designers: Duane Wilcoxson
- Publishers: Advanced Gaming Enterprises, Harlequin Games
- Years active: 1980s to 2000s
- Genres: Play-by-mail
- Languages: English
- Players: 3–9 per team
- Playing time: Months
- Materials required: Instructions, order sheets, turn results, paper, pencil

CTF 2187 (also known as CTF2187) is a closed-end, computer-moderated, play-by-mail (PBM) game that was published by Advanced Gaming Enterprises in the 1980s. It involved teams of robots, of varying size and capabilities, battling on a hex-grid arena with the purpose of defeating the opposing team or their command post. Players assumed the role of a battle robot pilot. The game was tactically-focused, with combat action beginning on the first turn. Games lasted 5–10 turns, or about six months. Players began at the rank of cadet but could spend experience points earned from a completed game to increase in rank (or statistics) for future games, up to the rank of General.

Various authors wrote works of fiction about the game in the 1980s to the 2000s in publications such as Paper Mayhem and Sabledrake magazine. CTF 2187 received generally positive reviews in the late 1980s and early 1990s. In Best Play-by-Mail Game results published in the PBM magazine Paper Mayhem, the game placed No. 4 in 1989 and No. 2 in 1996. The game placed 10th in Flagship magazine's best Wargame category in its 2002 Flagship PBM Ratings list.

== Play-by-mail history ==
Some games have long been played by mail between two players, such as chess and Go. PBM play of Diplomacy—a multiplayer game—began in 1963. The emergence of the professional PBM industry occurred less than a decade later. Rick Loomis, "generally recognized as the founder of the PBM industry", accomplished this by launching Flying Buffalo Inc. and his first PBM game, Nuclear Destruction, in 1970. Professional game moderation started in 1971 at Flying Buffalo. (Note: Flying Buffalo later added games such as Battleplan and Heroic Fantasy along with Starweb and others. By the late 1980s these games were all computer moderated.) Chris Harvey started commercial PBM play afterward in the United Kingdom with a company called ICBM through an agreement with Loomis and Flying Buffalo. ICBM, followed by KJC games and Mitregames, led the UK PBM industry. For approximately five years, Flying Buffalo was the single dominant company in the US PBM industry until Schubel & Son entered the field in about 1976 with the human-moderated The Tribes of Crane. Superior Simulations was the next significant PBM company to enter the US market. They did so in 1978 with the game Empyrean Challenge which one observer stated was "the most complex game system on Earth". (Note: According to reviewer Jim Townsend, some turn results could be 1,000 pages in length and due to the occasional extended turn results there was a significant investment in time to understand what happened on a turn as well as to fill out future turn orders. He said a player without a spreadsheet was "nearly doomed from the outset".)

The early 1980s saw additional growth for PBM. The player base grew and game moderators were plentiful. The most popular games in 1980 were Starweb and Tribes of Crane. The PBM industry in 1980 comprised two large companies and some small ones. In 1981, some PBM players started another company, Adventures by Mail, with the "immensely popular" Beyond the Stellar Empire. (Note: This section draws from portions of the History section of the Wikipedia Play-by-mail game article.)

The proliferation of PBM companies in the 1980s supported the publication of a number of newsletters from individual play-by-mail companies as well as independent publications which focused solely on the play-by-mail gaming industry such as the relatively short-lived The Nuts & Bolts of PBM and Gaming Universal. The PBM genre's two preeminent magazines of the period were Flagship and Paper Mayhem. It was within this environment that CTF 2187 was launched.

== Development ==
Gameplay image.

The game's original designer was Duane Wilcoxson, with development by Debbie Leonard. The game was first copyrighted in 1987 by Advanced Gaming Enterprises of Sacramento, CA. By 1994, the game was available in Australia, North America, and Europe, in multiple languages. In the late 1990s, Harlequin Games also published the game.

CTF 2187 was computer moderated, with programming by Duane Wilcoxson. The publisher, Adventures by Mail, also provided players The Command Post, a newsletter that provided game updates and commentary.

== Gameplay ==
At the outset, each player created a character—a pilot. New players, or cadets, could distribute fifteen points among the following six characteristics: intelligence, intuition, precision, reflexes, constitution, and luck. Secondary characteristics were also used, such as experience points, which could raise the six other characteristics.

Pilots operated bots, which were armed robotic fighting vehicles of varying capabilities and three varieties: light, medium, and heavy. (Note: The light bot types in 1988 were Hornet and Weaver, the mediums were Incinerator and Ravager, and the heavy types were Devastator and Titan.) Light bots weighed 30–50 tons, medium were 60–70 tons, and heavy bots 80–90 tons. Bots were armed with various weapons including lasers, missiles, and cannons. An example was the Devastator—a Heavy Battle Bot—which weighed 80 tons and was heavily armored and armed, making it challenging to face directly by other bots. (Note: The Devastator description stated that its main weapons were "a Particle Beam Cannon with excellent Fields of Fire in its Right Arm, a Heavy Machine Cannon and Heavy Laser in its Left Arm and a Mega-Missile L-Pack in its Right Front Torso".) However, the Devastator had drawbacks, including challenges with speed and control. This was typical of heavy bots—they were relatively slower and easier to hit. By 1997, there were 26 bot types, twenty more than the six basic types in the rulebook. Bot types were generally balanced, with no one type being superior to another.

Reviewer Mark Weseman stated that CTF 2187 was "a test of skill and endurance between battle robots (bots), which are usually divided in an arena measuring between 20 x 20 hexes to 30 x 30 hexes". Bots were organized into teams which maneuvered their bots to target opponents' bots or their command post. One point was scored per bot hit and two per command post hit. Weseman stated that CTF 2187 was a tactical game, with shooting from start to finish, requiring consideration of terrain and other tactical issues. In the end, both players and teams could achieve victory.

Advanced Gaming Enterprises described gameplay as follows:

You assume the role of a mercenary pilot in command of a huge robotic war machine know[n] as a Battle Bot. These machines weigh in at an average of 60 tons and feature the latest in hi-tech weapons, and gadetry including Battle Computers, Lasers, Sensors, Mini Missiles, Particle Beam Cannons and much, much more! The goal of each pilot is to achieve fame and glory. ... While each game is short (about five to 10 turns or about 6 months of play) but intense combat, your Pilot lives on from game to game gaining in experience and increasing his skills.

Reviewer Robert Woodard stated that CTF 2187 was a "complex, chesslike game" with six factors that players needed to monitor while playing. These factors were heat from moving or weapon firing, damage, engines, terrain (which could provide cover or block lines of fire), firing arc, and range/weapon selection.

Multiple game options were available which affected player and team numbers, and arena types. In a 2-team game, players competed in 2-sided arenas with between six and eight other teammates versus a similar team. In a 4-team game, players competed in a 4-sided arena with between two and three other teammates versus three other teams. A Free For All was another annual option where players acted individually versus other pilots. Tactics and team coordination were key aspects of the game.

Turns comprised five phases with one movement and attack per phase. Players could choose from 20 movement and 7 attack orders. Turn results were detailed with both text and graphics and were about four to six pages long.

After completing an arena, players received a final report and could spend experience points (XP) to raise statistic points (50 XP) or rank (200 XP). The highest possible stat score was 20 and the highest rank was General.

== Fiction ==
Various authors wrote fiction articles about CTF 2187 from the 1980s to the 2000s. These included articles in Paper Mayhem by Joe Holland, John C. Muir, and Shannon Muir, such as Joe Holland's "CTF2187: War as an Alternative to War" and John Muir's multiple part "Battle for Mars" series. Shannon Muir also wrote multiple fiction articles about the game. For example, she authored multiple pieces in Sabledrake magazine from 2001–2004 including works such as "CTF 2187: Storms in the Soul" and "CTF 2187: End of an Era".

== Reception and legacy ==
Reviewer Mark Weseman stated in 1988 that a drawback was an apparent incentive to focus on attacking the enemy CP. However, he concluded that he "would heartily recommend CTF 2187 to anyone interested in a tactical game of bot bashing", noting that the game was "fast-paced", moved quickly, and was mature and well-moderated. In 1991, Craig G. Mills stated that CTF 2187 "effectively combines ease of learning with a subtle chess-like strategy." In the November–December 1993 issue of Paper Mayhem, James Penrod stated that "If you like tactical combat with a five phase turn that simulates the fog of war, polite insults in the newsletter and not too many choices to make, you will like this game." In the March–April 1997 issue of Paper Mayhem, Robert R. Woodard stated that "if you're after a game with intense action and skillful play from start to finish, CTF 2187 is it!", also noting that "You don't have to spend $200.00 and a year and a half to complete a single game."

In 1990, Paper Mayhem rated CTF 2187 #4 in its list of the Best Play-By-Mail Games of 1989 as voted by its readers. In the November–December 1996 issue of Paper Mayhem, the game placed #2 in the list of Best PBM Games of 1996. In the December 2002 – January 2003 issue of Flagship, CTF 2187 placed 10th in its best PBM Wargame category of the Flagship PBM Ratings 2002 list. (Note: Flagship listed the publisher for CTF 2187 at this time as Harlequin Games.)

== See also ==
- Duel II, gladiatorial combat PBM game.
- List of play-by-mail games

== Bibliography ==
- "Advanced Gaming Enterprises". The Journal of the PBM Gamer (4th ed.). Paper Mayhem. 1990. p. 6.
- Advanced Gaming Enterprises (December 23, 2004). "CTF 2187" (PDF). Advanced Gaming Enterprises. Archived from the original (PDF) on 2004-12-23.
- Advanced Gaming Enterprises (May 23, 2002). "Advanced Gaming Enterprises". Archived from the original on 2002-05-23.
- Advanced Gaming Enterprises (1992). "CTF 2187: Basic Rule Book" (PDF). Advanced Gaming Enterprises. Archived from the original (PDF) on April 10, 2004.
- Babcock, Chris (December 2013). "Diplomacy" (PDF). Suspense and Decision. No. 2. p. 16. Archived from the original (PDF) on July 4, 2021.
- Editors (June 1997). "News". Games Without Frontiers. No. 2. p. 4.
- Harvey, Chris (Spring 1984). "The Future of PBM". Flagship. No. 2. p. 21.
- Harvey, Chris (April–May 2003). "My Life in Games" (PDF). Flagship. No. 102. p. 26.
- Holland, Joe (July–August 1989). "CTF2187: War as an Alternative to War". Paper Mayhem. No. 37. pp. 16–18.
- McLain, Bob (August 1, 1993). "Play By Mail: The Infancy of Cyberspace". Pyramid. sjgames.com.
- Mills, Craig G. (July–August 1991). "The Internal Structure of CTF-2187". Paper Mayhem. No. 49. pp. 22–23.
- Muir, Shannon (August 2001). "CTF 2187: Storms in the Soul". Sabledrake Magazine. Archived from the original on February 8, 2002 – via Wayback Machine.
- Muir, Shannon (November–December 1994). "Post Marque Special Play-By-Mail Section: CTF 2187". Shadis. No. 16. pp. 95–97.
- Muir, Shannon (November 2004). "CTF 2187: End of an Era". Sabledrake Magazine. Archived from the original on October 21, 2006 – via Wayback Machine.
- Paduch, Sally (June 27, 1993). "Email Brings Immediacy to Play-By-Mail Games". New York Times. p. RC21.
- Paper Mayhem (January–February 1990). "Best PBM Game of 1989". Paper Mayhem. No. 40. p. 2.
- Penrod, James (Nov–Dec 1993). "Tall Tales and Turn Sheets (My Experiences in CTF 2187)". Paper Mayhem. No. 63. pp. 18–19.
- Popolizio, Mike; LeBlanc, Liz; Popolizio, Marti (January–February 1990). "Revamping a Classic! The Redesign of BSE". Paper Mayhem. No. 40. pp. 8–10.
- Schlosser, John (July–August 1988). "CTF 2187 Profile: The Devastator". Paper Mayhem. No. 31. pp. 20–21.
- Rogers, Patrick (May–June 1994). "Post Marque: Special Play-by-Mail Section". Shadis. No. 13. The Alderac Group. p. 89.
- "Rick Loomis on Play-By-Mail [Editor Intro]". The Space Gamer. No. #75. July–August 1985. p. 35.
- "TSG Surveys: Play-By-Mail Game Companies". The Space Gamer. No. 33. November 1980. p. 13.
- Townsend, Jim (1988). "The PBM Corner". White Wolf Magazine. No. 11. p. 20.
- Webber, David (November–December 1996). "Best PBM Game of 1996". Paper Mayhem. No. 81. p. 4.
- Weseman, Mark A. (September–October 1988). "PBM Capsule: An Overview of CTF 2187". Paper Mayhem. No. 32. pp. 47–48.
- "Where We're Heading". Paper Mayhem. No. 27. November–December 1987. p. 2.
- Newsdesk (December 2002 – January 2003). "Where We're Heading" (PDF). Flagship. No. 100. p. 10.
- Woodard, Robert R. (March–April 1997). "CTF 2187: Fighting Fire with Fire". Paper Mayhem. No. 83. pp. 24–26.
