= Cthulhu's Heirs =

Cthulhu's Heirs is a 1994 fiction anthology published by Chaosium.

== Contents ==
Cthulhu's Heirs is an anthology in which short stories about the Cthulhu mythos are compiled from modern authors.

== Publication history ==
Shannon Appelcline noted that when Chaosium started publishing fiction, "Most of the early Cthulhu books were overseen by Robert M. Price, the editor of the long running 'zine Crypt of Cthulhu... Cthulhu's Heirs (1994) was a different type of book, a new collection of Mythos fiction."

== Reception ==
Aaron Voss reviewed Cthulhu's Heirs in White Wolf Inphobia #53 (March, 1995), rating it a 3 out of 5 and stated that "This is not the greatest collection of modern horror stories, but some do make the book worthwhile for the avid collector."

Cthulhu's Heirs won the Origins Award for Best Game-Related Fiction of 1994.

== Reviews ==
- Australian Realms #18
- Review by S. T. Joshi (1994) in Lovecraft Studies, #31 Fall 1994
- Review by Gahan Wilson (1995) in Realms of Fantasy, February 1995
- Review by Stephen Mark Rainey (1996) in Horror, Issue #6 (1996)
