= Kings & Things (play-by-mail game) =

Fantasy role-playing game

- Designers: Tom Wham
- Publishers: Andon Games
- Years active: 1987 to 1990s
- Genres: Heroic Fantasy
- Languages: English
- Systems: Computer moderated
- Players: Up to 20
- Materials required: Instructions, order sheets, turn results, paper, pencil
- Media type: Play-by-mail

Kings & Things (also known as Kings & Things*) was a computer moderated fantasy play-by-mail game published by Andon Games that was active in the 1980s and early 1990s. In the game, up to twenty players took the role of leader of a kingdom and recruited "things" or creatures to assist them in becoming the next emperor. Combat, diplomacy, and magic played significant roles in this fantasy role-playing game. Reception was generally positive, although there were comments about cumbersome turn results during the late 1980s. The game enjoyed peak reviews and ratings in the late 1980s and early 1990s, winning the Origins Award for best play-by-mail game in 1988.

== Gameplay ==
On a 12 × 12 map, up to twenty players were leaders of different kingdoms in the land of Kadab, vying to become the next emperor. Each of the countries — with names such as Juju, Sulu, and Terrain Kings — had a unique power such as increased offense or additional income per turn. Twelve of the twenty kingdoms were unique. Seven received special terrain bonuses for fighting in home terrain type, two received magical bonuses, and two received spying/stealing bonuses.

Players tried to recruit various creatures for their armies, which could be ""a slime beast, killer turtle, swamp gas, flying buffalo … or bird of paradise". Players began the game with a basic army, and acquired more by exploring different territories, vanquished foes, or simply buying them.

Combat was a central part of the game and allowed the player to make choices about ranged weapons, melee, and acceptable losses. Like many fantasy games, magic also played a significant role, and kingdoms possessed and could train additional wizards to employ in combat, which could enable an otherwise outnumbered army to win the day on the field of battle. A more unusual tool available was the random event, which could be used against enemies, including in combat. (Note: Additional non-combat Random Events were also part of gameplay. These included such events as Concentration, Good Harvest, and Mother Lode.) These included events such as "nomadic Tribesman, Laziness, Vandals", and others. Players who added to their territory list from successful combat gained additional food and income per turn from the territory based on its type.

Game mechanics allowed players other actions as well, to include the ability to build several types of forts including towers, keeps, castles, and citadels, in increasing order of strength. Players could also conduct spying and stealing missions from other kingdoms.

== Development ==
In 1983, Tom Wham designed and produced the artwork for a game titled King of the Tabletop, which was included as a pull-out game in Issue 77 of Dragon. Wham subsequently revised the game, and it was reimplemented as a boxed set titled Kings & Things, published in a bookcase box in 1986 by West End Games in North America and Games Workshop in the UK.

In 1987, Andon Games started to develop a computer-moderated play-by-mail (PBM) game. In the September–October 1987 issue of Paper Mayhem, Andon advised that game development was proceeding quickly with a developing rulebook and nearly-filled playtest games, and the first playtest game was expected to begin in August 1987 with game release before December 31, 1987. However, in the November–December 1987 issue, Andon announced that playtesting was being delayed by a few weeks due to some recently fixed programming issues.

One problem noted by some critics was the excessive number of pages mailed to players with each turn result due to overly long descriptions of every battle. The extra paper meant that Andon paid high amounts of postage — Paper Mayhem editor-in-chief David Webber noted that some turn results were costing Andon 85 cents or more in postage at a time when regular letter post was only 25 cents. After the launch of the game, Andon shortened the descriptions of battles to reduce the size of the turn result.

In the September–October 1992 issue of Paper Mayhem, Andon Games announced that they had changed their name to Graaf Simulations.

== Reception and legacy ==
In the December 1988 edition of White Wolf magazine (Issue 13), Stewart Wieck gave the game average marks for materials, moderation, strategy, and diplomacy, with an overall rating of 3 out of 5.

In the March/April 1989 issue of Paper Mayhem, David Webber noted that both he and his wife Elaine played the game. He stated that he enjoyed the game and would play again, pointing to the "mix of power and diplomacy" as a positive aspect. His only criticism was the "cumbersome" turn results due to excessive pages, although he noted at the time that Gary Smith of Andon Games had recently made, and was continuing to make, game modifications.

The player ratings for Kings & Things' peaked in the late 1980s and early 1990s, after which they gradually declined

- In the January/February 1990 issue of Paper Mayhem, Kings & Things placed 11 out of 53 relative to other games in reader-rated categories of playability, design, and product understanding.
- In the July/August 1991 issue, it placed 29 of 79 games.
- In the September/October 1992 issue, the game placed 66 of 84 games, with the company name changed to Graaf Simulations.
- In the July/August 1993 issue, the game was listed as 73 of 81.

By the July/August 1994 issue, Kings & Things was no longer listed in Paper Mayhem's list of 72 rated play-by-mail games. (Note: As game ratings were generated by gamers sending in ratings to the Paper Mayhem editorial staff, this meant that (1) no Kings & Things players submitted a rating of the game prior to the 1994 issue, or (2) the game was no longer available for play.)

== Awards ==
- At the 1989 Origins Awards, Kings & Things was awarded "Best Play-by-Mail Game of 1988".
- In Paper Mayhem ratings for "Best PBM Game of 1989", Kings & Things tied for second place with Alamaze.

== See also ==
- List of play-by-mail games

== Notes and references ==
=== Bibliography ===
- Andon Games (September–October 1987). "Andon Games". Paper Mayhem. No. 26. p. 24.
- Meckel, Steven L. (March–April 1989). "The Kingdoms of Kings & Things*". Paper Mayhem. No. 35. pp. 8–9.
- "PBM Game Ratings: As of 11/12/89". Paper Mayhem. No. 40. January–February 1990.
- "Where We're Heading: Best PBM Game of 1989". Paper Mayhem. No. 40. January–February 1990. p. 2.
- "PBM Game Ratings: As of 5-19-91". Paper Mayhem. No. 49. July–August 1991. pp. 54–55.
- "PBM Game Ratings: As of 07/20/92". Paper Mayhem. No. 56. September–October 1992. pp. 52–53.
- "PBM Game Ratings: As of 04/04/93". Paper Mayhem. No. 60. May–June 1993. pp. 44–45.
- "PBM Game Ratings: As of 06/06/93". Paper Mayhem. No. 61. July–August 1993. pp. 44–45.
- "PBM Game Ratings: As of 5/29/94". Paper Mayhem. No. 67. July–August 1994. pp. 44–45.
- Trice, John (March–April 1989). "Kings & Things – Strategy". Paper Mayhem. No. 35. pp. 10–11.
- Webber, David (March–April 1989). "Kings & Things* PBM". Paper Mayhem. No. 35. pp. 6–7.
- Wieck, Stewart (December 1988). "PBM Royalty: Kings & Things". White Wolf. No. 13. p. 52.
- "1988 Origins Awards winners". Archived from the original on 2008-11-21.
