= Reality Simulations =

Company

Reality Simulations Incorporated
- Company type: Private
- Industry: Play-by-mail game moderator
- Founded: 1984
- Headquarters: Tempe, Arizona
- Key people: Edward Schoonover, Paul W. Brown III, Charles Kraver, Lee Kline
- Products: Hyborian War
- Website: http://www.reality.com/

Reality Simulations Incorporated (RSI) is a game company in Tempe, Arizona, USA, that publishes and runs play-by-mail games.

== History ==
Founded by Paul W. Brown III and Charles Kraver in 1984, the company runs several commercial play-by-mail (PBM) games, including Duel2 (previously called Duelmasters), Hyborian War, first published in 1985, and Forgotten Realms: War of the Avatars. The company previously ran the PBM games The Next Empire, initially published by Cyborg Games, and Alamaze, initially published by Pegasus Productions. The company stated in 1993 that there were over 3,000 people playing RSI PBM games, which included, at the time, Duelmasters, Hyborian War, and The Next Empire.

In the Nov/Dec 1996 issue of Paper Mayhem magazine, RSI tied for third place in its list of the Best PBM companies of 1996.

== List of games ==
- Duel2
- Hyborian War
- Forgotten Realms: War of the Avatars

== See also ==
- List of play-by-mail games
