= Pellic Quest =

Science fiction play-by-mail game

- Publishers: Conflict Interaction Associates
- Years active: 1978–1988
- Genres: play-by-mail
- Languages: English
- Systems: computer-moderated
- Players: 10–15
- Playing time: limited (closed ended)
- Materials required: Instructions, order sheets, turn results, paper, pencil
- Media type: Play-by-mail

Pellic Quest was a computer moderated science fiction play-by-mail (PBM) game published by Conflict Interaction Associates (CIA) that appeared as early as 1978.

== Description ==
Pellic Quest was a PBM in which 10–15 players competed to dominate a universe strewn with artifacts left by a super-race, the Pellics. Each player commanded an alien race, able to jump between over 200 worlds. The science fiction setting presented a universe where a departed "super-race called the Pellics" left various artifacts. Players attempted to dominate the galaxy aided by Pellic artifacts. Ground combat was also a game element.

Players started by choosing to be one of six role types. Each had different abilities, and each earned victory points in a different way:

- Emperor: Uses people and material to earn victory points
- Crusader: Conquers and subjugates planets.
- Brigand: A pirate who raids planets and builds space fleets
- Droyds: Robots who earn Victory Points by destroying planet life and building more droyds.
- Traders: Use the production potential of each world.
- Zente: Insectoid warriors that breed at a high rate and try to destroy everything in their path.

Each player started on a different home world with a given industrial capacity, production capability, number of soldiers and a stockpile of material (the game's currency). Each turn, players mailed in an order sheet with computer codes for various orders for creating star fleets, industries and soldiers; movement; combat; reconnaissance; developing alliances; and diplomacy. Three types of star fleets were available: scout, battle, and all-purpose.

Inter-player diplomacy played an important part of the game -- critic David Macnamara noted "Player alliances dominate the game and you can't usually survive without at least one ally.". First contact was through the game with the exchange of a 3"x5" card, and thereafter via phone or personal mail.

There was no set number of turns; the player who amassed a certain number of victory points first was the winner. This usually took around 20 turns.

== Development ==
Flying Buffalo published the science fiction PBM Starweb in 1975. Conflict Interaction Associates developed and published Pellic Quest as a licensed spinoff of Starweb by 1978. The cost in 1978 was $6 for the rulebook, and $1.50 per turn. By 1981 turn fees had increased to $2.25.

The game shut down by 1988.

== Reception ==
In the September 1978 edition of Dragon (Issue 18), Dave Minch liked the fact that the game was computer moderated, which he had not experienced before. "With this there can be no bad die rolls, no faulty judge interpretation, and no over-balanced character overrunning the game. You play against known character types and can react accordingly so that you don’t make mistakes because of total ignorance. You always know exactly what your limitations are and what you must do to counteract them." Minch concluded with a recommendation: "All things considered, the game is well worth trying and spending time on. I look for games of this type to happen much more frequently."

In the April–May 1979 edition of White Dwarf (Issue 12), John Reynolds liked the multitude of possible actions that players were allowed. He concluded, "Pellic Quest is the first game to be produced by CIA and if it's anything to go by, the hobby of computer gaming is here to stay."

In a 1979 Game Survey held by The Space Gamer and published in the May–June 1980 edition (Issue 20), readers rated the game 5.6 out of 10.

In the August 1981 edition of The Space Gamer (No. 42), Steve Jackson compared Pellic Quest favorably to its antecedent, Starweb, saying, "I'd recommend this to any StarWeb player who enjoys the original game and wants to try a variant – or to the tactics-oriented space gamer looking to 'get his feet wet' in PBM computer combat."

In Issue 27 of Abyss, David Macnamara noted "The most unfortunate aspect of this game is the length of time between turns. Players can and do lose interest when turnaround time is a month. Games can last for years!" Despite this Macnamara concluded, "It is a good way to meet other serious PBM gamers."

The November–December 1983 issue of PBM Universal highlighted the game's moderation and low pricing.

In 1985, the game tied with DuelMasters, Power, and Quest of the Great Jewels for third place in the first annual Paper Mayhem Awards for "Best PBM Game".

== See also ==
- List of play-by-mail games

== Bibliography ==
- Editors (1988). "Spotlight on Computer-Moderated SF Games: Pellic Quest". Flagship. No. 18. pp. 27–28.
