= Adventurer Kings =

Play-by-mail role-playing game

- Publishers: Ark Royal Games, Roland Danard
- Years active: ~1990 to current
- Genres: Role-playing, medieval fantasy
- Languages: English
- Players: 8–12
- Playing time: Fixed
- Materials required: Instructions, order sheets, turn results, paper, pencil
- Media type: Play-by-mail or email
- Website: https://epistoludisme.com/en/ak/index.php

Adventurer Kings is a closed-end, computer-moderated, play-by-mail game. It was originally published by Ark Royal Games. Today it is published by Roland Danard.

The game is set in a medieval fantasy context with a map comprising 162 provinces. Players begin roleplaying as a king with a few resources to begin expansion by conquest. Characters are central to the game with various races, attributes, and alignments available. Magic and diplomacy are also part of the gameplay. Games last about 10–15 turns of one year each. Players with the greatest number of victory points win the game.

== History and development ==
Adventurer Kings was initially published by Ark Royal Games. The game is computer moderated. It is close-ended. As of 2022, Roland Danard publishes the game.

== Gameplay ==
Adventurer Kings is set in a medieval context. The game map comprises 162 provinces. Games have 8–12 players with "Super" games having 25–40 players.

Players play the role of a minor king of a province with a few armies and some gold with the goal of expansion. Each annual turn allows players to conduct about a dozen and a half orders for characters and armies from spying, exploring, and recruiting or disbanding armies. Characters are central to the game and have various attributes and alignments. Player characters must be an Elf, Dwarf, Orc or Human while non-player character races of dragons and others are encountered in the game.

Magic plays a part in the game, with various magic items available and specific characters able to cast spells. Diplomacy is also part of gameplay, with all relationships beginning as neutral and players deciding how to progress as the game develops.

Games last 10–15 turns. The player with the greatest number of victory points at the game's conclusion is the winner. Games end if (1) a player—who becomes World Emperor—"controls 55% of the world tax base" or (2) more than two players control the same percentage and call for an election.

== Reception ==
James Morgan reviewed the game in the July–August 1990 issue of Paper Mayhem, stating, "I recommend the game Adventurer Kings to all Fantasy game players." Adam Spatz provided a positive review in the March–April 1991 issue of Paper Mayhem, stating, "This is an excellent game with a great moderator and fast turnaround," while noting that others felt similarly, pointing to high ratings in Paper Mayhem.

Stewart Wieck reviewed Adventurer Kings in White Wolf #27 (June/July, 1991), rating it a 4 out of 5 and stated that "AK is a very sound, well-moderated game. There are elements of the game that are very intriguing, and computer-users may be happy to use the support program Ark Royal makes available, but the game lacks just enough zip to keep it from rating as a 5. Due to the scope of the game, five orders per character per turn is sometimes just not enough. However, AK is ranked highly in the polls of the major PBM magazines and is very deserving of a good look, or even a three turn sample game."

== See also ==
- List of play-by-mail games

== Bibliography ==
- Chenevert, Phil (September–October 1992). "Adventurer Kings". Paper Mayhem. No. 56. pp. 10–16.
- Danard, R. "Adventurer Kings". 2022.
- Eisenman, Rich (January 1992). "Return to Adventurer Kings". Flagship. No. 35. pp. 16–17.
- Morgan, James (July–August 1990). "Adventurer Kings". Paper Mayhem. No. 43. pp. 5–8.
- Spatz, Adam (March–April 1991). "How to Be An Adventurer King". Paper Mayhem. No. 47. pp. 15–17.
- Wieck, Stewart (June–July 1991). "PBM Corner: Adventurer Kings". White Wolf Magazine. No. 27. p. 49.
