= Quest of the Great Jewels =

Play-by-mail fantasy game

- Designers: Mike Shefler
- Publishers: Zorph Enterprises
- Years active: Early 1980s to present
- Genres: fantasy wargame, play-by-email
- Languages: English
- Players: 12
- Playing time: Fixed
- Materials required: Instructions, order sheets, turn results, paper, pencil
- Media type: Play-by-mail or email
- Website: https://www.facebook.com/groups/565574913625939/

Quest of the Great Jewels is a closed-end, computer moderated, play-by-email game. It was initially published and moderated by Zorph Enterprises in the early 1980s. The game was created by Mike Shefler.

== Gameplay ==
Quest of the Great Jewels is a computer-moderated play-by-mail game. It is a "closed ended wargame" with turn times of about three weeks for regular games and slightly longer for team games. Reviewer Dale A Perkins noted that it was most simply described as a "fantasy wargame centered on hand-to-hand combat". Quest involved twelve players, each of whom could choose one of four races, each of which had different objectives and powers:

- Azoni were fighters who bred slowly and earned victory points by building citadels
- Quntag were empire builders who earned victory points by controlling territory
- Rilris were treasure seekers who earned money by hoarding money and magic treasures
- Slenth bred at a prodigious rate, and although they were the weakest fighters, they earned victory points by destroying and ravaging

The four races were well-balanced, with no race offering an advantage over the others.

In addition to building and conquering, players could seek out magical talismans that would give them some sort of advantage over other players. These were found in neutral cities, in dragon hoards or in ten Forbidden Cities. In order to enter a Forbidden City, the player first had to happen upon a key. However, the player then had to discover the hidden location of the Forbidden City that the key opened in order to successfully unlock the gate and retrieve the magic jewel.

The game's goal was to acquire all three of the "great jewels" which were "talismans of immense power". Another way to win the game was to have the highest score on the final turn. However, obtaining all three jewels ended the game automatically. By 1986, no one had yet done this. Finally, Zorph Enterprises announced in the May/June 1986 issue of Paper Mayhem, that a game had ended with someone capturing all three jewels (game QJ-13).

When the game began, the victory condition was to be the first player to gain a specific but unrevealed number of victory points. However, after player complaints that the games were too short, Zorph Enterprises changed the victory condition, making the winner the player with the most victory points when the game ended at a specific but unrevealed point somewhere between Turn 20 and Turn 30.

Quest of the Great Jewels was computer moderated, with a turn every 10 days. The initial cost was $10 for the rulebook and the first two turns, $2.50 for turns 3–10, and $3 for subsequent turns.

== Reception ==
In the April 1985 edition of Dragon (Issue 96), Mike Gray was enthusiastic about the game, saying that it was "one of my favorite play-by-mail games... I enjoy building up my empire, sending great armies into battle, and capturing special magic items." Gray did question the game balance, noting that as a Slenth "it seems to be very hard to get enough victory points to win... A Slenth must kill and destroy things... this is not as easy a task as it is for an Azoni to build citradels in the safety of his kingdom, or for a Rilris to hoard his money turn after turn." Gray also didn't like the length of time it took to find a key to a Forbidden City and then discover which Forbidden City the key opened. "By the time you find out and fight your way through enemy territory to get there, the game will be close to being over." He ended with a recommendation and a caution: "I like Quest of the Great Jewels very much and recommend it highly. However, it is very much a game of diplomacy. If you don’t spend time and money communicating with other players, you’ll soon have many uninvited guests in your kingdom."

In the Sept-Oct 1985 edition of The Space Gamer (No. 76), David Ladyman gave the game a thumbs up, saying, "On balance, let me give an enthusiastic endorsement to Quest of the Great Jewels and to Zorph Enterprises. Their game entertains without annoying, and there aren't many games, especially by mail, of which that can be said." In 1986, Paper Mayhem reviewer Dale A. Perkins stated that "If you are into Dungeons and Dragons' style combat, this is the game for you", recommending trying the game, regardless of gaming background. In 1991, reviewer Vickie Lloyd advised that her concerns with the game were "very minor" and Quest was "a great game and I very much recommend it", especially for beginners.

In 1985, the game tied with DuelMasters, Pellic Quest, and Power for Third Place in the 1st Annual Paper Mayhem Awards for "Best PBM Game".

== See also ==
- List of play-by-mail games

== Bibliography ==
- Gray, Mike (April 1985). "PBM Update: News & Views". Dragon. No. 96. p. 41.
- Ladyman, David (Sep–Oct 1985). "Keeping Posted: Two PBM Reviews". Space Gamer. No. 76. Steve Jackson Games. pp. 31–32.
- Lloyd, Vickie (March–April 1990). "Quest of the Great Jewels". Paper Mayhem. No. 41. pp. 9–11.
- Paduch, Sally (September–October 1992). "Quest of the Great Jewels". Paper Mayhem. No. 56. pp. 32–33.
- Perkins, Dale A. (July–August 1986). "Quest of the Great Jewels". Paper Mayhem. No. 19. p. 33.
- "1st Annual Paper Mayhem Awards". Paper Mayhem. No. 15. November–December 1985. p. 23.
- "Gameline". Paper Mayhem. No. 18. May–June 1986. p. 22.
