= Alamaze =

Play-by-mail fantasy roleplaying game

- Designers: Rick McDowell
- Publishers: John Mulholland, Pegasus Productions, Reality Simulations
- Years active: 1986–present
- Genres: Fantasy, play-by-mail, play-by-email, turn-based
- Languages: English
- Players: 15
- Playing time: Months
- Materials required: Instructions, order sheets, turn results, paper, pencil
- Media type: Play-by-email
- Website: https://www.alamaze.co/

Alamaze is a computer-moderated, fantasy, turn-based game. It was published in 1986 by Pegasus Productions as a play-by-mail game. Reality Simulations later took over game moderation. The game itself has been played with multiple versions. The initial design, released in 1986, was replaced by the "Second Cycle" in 1991, offering changes to the kingdoms and game's history. The 3rd Cycle—"The Choosing"—emerged in 2015, doubling the available kingdoms while providing modifications to them. The publisher made additional changes to the player–game interface by 2017. In February 2019, Alamaze.co published the 4th Cycle, the world of Maelstrom, after two years of development. The game is currently run by Alamaze.co as a closed-end, play-by-email (PBEM) game in a turn-based format.

In the latest game cycles, twelve players per game choose from eighteen possible kingdoms, employ various available characters, and strive for victory. Winning players achieve dominance of the map, meet the victory conditions of their respective kingdom, or have the greatest number of status points.

Alamaze received multiple reviews in the 1980s and 1990s. These were mainly positive, with some noting challenges with the publication company in the period, which were noted largely resolved. Alamaze has also received a number of awards, to include the Origins Award for "Best Play-by-Mail Game of 1987", and high marks in the Best PBM Game category in Paper Mayhem magazine in 1987 and 1989.

== Publication history ==
Alamaze was a computer-moderated play-by-mail game designed by Rick McDowell. It was born in 1983 as an idea for a fantasy game. An initial playtest involved six "local gaming aficianados" and resulted in a computer-moderated game using two megabytes of RAM. The first "official" playtest began in 1985. 15 PBM professionals and experienced gamers participated, resulting in adjustments, another playtest, and a final publication version.

In the May & June 1986 issue of Paper Mayhem magazine, Pegasus Productions announced that their first several games were filled and they were going "full speed ahead" with play.

In The November–December 1991 issue of Paper Mayhem magazine, David Pitzer reviewed the game's "Second Cycle of Magic"—the newest scenario at the time. He offered two advantages to this version: (1) all players would be experienced, and (2) updates to the world's history and changes to the various kingdoms.

In 2013–2015 the game underwent another redesign, this time to "The 3rd Cycle: The Choosing." This redesign adjusted aspects of the kingdoms and doubled their number to 24. The publisher also made changes to the formatting of the game interface, order entry forms, and turn results, as well as introducing a mini-dueling game within the broader Alamaze game.

By 2017, Alamaze was no longer a purely play-by-mail game; Rick McDowell described it as both a "fantasy adventure war-game" and a "turn based, multi-player campaign styled game ... in the grand tradition of text based PBEM gaming". Additionally, each games comprised 12 players, versus the previous 15.

In February 2019, Alamaze.co released Alamaze 4th Cycle: Maelstrom which enables "[p]lay on the new world of Maelstrom, with 13 regions".

== Gameplay ==
According to reviewer David Pitzer, Alamaze is "a competition set in a fantastic realm where fifteen players battle to achieve victory". Each player controls one of eighteen possible kingdoms: Barbarian, Darkelven, Dragon, Dwarven, Elven, Giant, Gnome, Halfling, Nomadic, Paladin, Ranger, Swampmen, Underworld, Urik, Warlock, Sorcerer, Westmen, and Witchlord. The inhabitants of each kingdom each have different advantages and each has a special victory condition.

Each player has varying numbers of

- Troops: for conquering new territories
- Agents: can be spies or assassins
- Emissaries: sent on diplomatic missions
- Leaders: lead the military groups. As they progress in levels, they confer increasing bonuses to the group's strength
- Wizards: The only wielders of magic in the game. Each kingdom has a fixed number of wizards; their maximum level varies from kingdom to kingdom.

All these various characters can advance in levels except the troops.

The game is played out on a 26 x 26 grid map, 676 squares of various types of terrain such as forest, mountains and cities, all of which have an effect on both movement and combat. Each player only has a rough idea of what the map contains, and must explore it, square by square, to uncover the locations of special items and other kingdoms.

There are three paths to victory:

1. Take control of six out of ten regions on the map
2. Meet the specific victory condition given to your kingdom
3. Have the greatest number of status points at the end of Turn 40.

Players can only write a number of orders each turn equal to their king's Influence, which starts at 12–15, depending on the kingdom. This can increase or decrease depending on actions of the player and his opponents. If the player is able to win a seat on the five-member High Council, the king's Influence increases by 1. However, each king hides three secrets. If any of these are discovered by another player and revealed, the king loses Influence, and if a member of the High Council, is removed from it.

Each kingdom can have a maximum of four military groups, which can be composed of archers, cavalry, infantry, leaders and wizards. These military groups have 20 movement points per turn, but this is affected by terrain, and each kingdom has advantages and disadvantages in certain types of terrain.

Players must pay their followers and feed their citizenry in order to accomplish anything. For example, it costs 6,000 gold to use a prince emissary. The money and food comes from human habitations: village produce a little gold and a lot of food; towns produce more gold than food; cities produce a lot of gold, but cost food rather than produce it. In the three months of the winter, gold production is halved and food production is 25% of normal.

Other possible orders for player included trading surpluses of food or gold with other kingdoms, searching for artifacts, or having a wizard cast spells. (Each spellcasting has a cost dependent on the level of the spell.)

== Reception ==
Bill Flad provided an early review in the July–August 1986 issue of Paper Mayhem, listing ten reasons why he preferred Alamaze "to the more standard fare", ranging from computer moderation to its challenging, nonrigid gameplay. In the March 1988 edition of Dragon (Issue 131), Michael Gray enjoyed the game, calling it "a treat". Gray liked the computer moderation, and the priority number of each possible order. He did have issues with the high-level spells he was given, finding them underpowered. Gray also didn't like the fact that "an enemy player can hit and run before you can catch him. For example, an enemy group can show up at one of my towns on one turn, then attack the town on the next turn, capture it, and move away before I can catch it. I can use an agent to find out where the group went, but unless I am lucky, it can always stay one jump ahead of me." Gray also found $6 per turn to be very high for a game that might last as long as 40 turns, and warned that players would have to spend a lot of time (and possibly a lot of money on long-distance charges) in order to coordinate with other players. However, overall, he highly recommended the game.

Reviewer Jim Townsend stated in White Wolf Magazine in 1988 that "Alamaze is possibly the finest PBM game in existence", noting that it was "the most innovative design since the first PBM game emerged". Townsend noted at the time that even though the game still had significant issues, and experienced players had "a MASSIVE advantage" over novices, Alamaze "should still be tried by anyone who considers [themselves] a real gamer".

In his 1991 review, Pitzer noted that, "I have never spoken to a PBM player who thought that the award winning Alamaze was anything less than a spectacular game." He also noted that many "became dismayed" with Pegasus Productions' service-related issues in how they ran and managed the game at the time. Pitzer noted that following the company's move [in 1991] from Fort Lauderdale, FL to Waynesville, NC, the issues had largely been resolved.

Stewart Wieck reviewed the game in 1990 in White Wolf No. 21, stating that "Alamaze is the best fantasy PBM game I have ever played, and if not for a few problems with the program itself and a slightly erratic turn-around time, Alamaze would win my highest rating". Wieck gave Alamaze an overall rating of 4 out of a possible 5.

John Moe reviewed Alamaze Second Cycle in White Wolf #35 (March/April, 1993), rating it a 4 out of 5 and stated that "All of these changes make the Second Cycle a fresh, exciting and dangerous addition to the First Cycle games which Pegasus Productions has been running for over five years."

== Awards ==
Alamaze was awarded the Origins Award for "Best Play-by-Mail Game of 1987". Also in 1987, Alamaze tied for first place with Hyborian War for Best PBM Game of 1987 in Paper Mayhem, a magazine for play-by-mail gamers. In 1989, Alamaze tied for second place for Best PBM Game of 1989 with Kings & Things* in Paper Mayhem magazine.

== Reviews ==
- White Wolf Magazine Issue #11
- Flagship Magazine Issue #11

== See also ==
- List of play-by-mail games

== Bibliography ==
- "ALAMAZE: The Definitive Multi-Player Strategy Game of Fantasy Kingdoms". Alamaze.co.
- Flad, Bill (July–August 1986). "Review of Alamaze". Paper Mayhem. No. 19. pp. 20–24.
- Flad, Bill (May–June 1987). "Strategies for the Thinking Alamaze Player". Paper Mayhem. No. 24. pp. 10–13.
- "Gameline". Paper Mayhem. No. 18. May–June 1986. p. 21.
- Gray, Michael (March 1988). "Fantasy First Class: Entering the Alamaze Play-By-Mail Universe". Dragon (131). TSR, Inc.: 18–20.
- Flad, Bill (September–October 1988). "An Interview With Rick McDowell: Creator of Alamaze". Paper Mayhem. No. 32. pp. 11–13.
- Jumbie (August 2014). "Secrets in the Sand: A Tale from the World of Alamaze" (PDF). Suspense and Decision. No. 10. playbymail.net. pp. 57–70.
- McDowell, Rick (February 2017). "Advances in the PBEM Experience: Alamaze 3rd Cycle" (PDF). Suspense and Decision. No. 15. playbymail.net. p. 38. Archived from the original (PDF) on October 30, 2020.
- McDowell, Rick (February 2017). "ALAMAZE: The Choosing Overview and a Glimpse at Four Kingdoms" (PDF). Suspense and Decision. No. 15. playbymail.net. pp. 42–48. Archived from the original (PDF) on October 30, 2020.
- Milliken, Christopher (Jan–Feb 1989). "Alamaze, The Second Cycle". Paper Mayhem. No. 34. pp. 10–11.
- Moe, John (July–August 1991). "A Review of Alamaze". Paper Mayhem. No. 49. pp. 14–16.
- Moe, John (March–April 1993). "A Detailed Look at the PBM Game Alamaze Second Cycle". White Wolf. No. 35. p. 48-50.
- Mosteller, Charles (October 2015). "Rick spills the magic beans: An Interview with the Founder of Alamaze" (PDF). Suspense & Decision. No. 11. playbymail.net. pp. 49–52.
- Pitzer, David (November–December 1991). "2nd Cycle Alamaze Review". Paper Mayhem. No. 51. pp. 22–23.
- Schawbel, Josh (March–April 1989). "Alamaze – Darkelven Strategy". Paper Mayhem. No. 35. pp. 15–16.
- Townsend, Jim (December 1988). "The PBM Corner". White Wolf. No. 13. p. 50.
- Townsend, Jim; Milliken, Chris; Bond, Chris (July–August 1987). "All You Ever Wanted to Know About Team Play in Alamaze". Paper Mayhem. No. 25. pp. 34–35.
- Townsend, Jim; Milliken, Chris; Bond, Chris (September–October 1987). "All You Ever Wanted to Know About Team Play in Alamaze: Part II". Paper Mayhem. No. 26. p. 26.
- Wieck, Stewart (June–July 1991). "Play-By-Mail Game Reviews: Alamaze". White Wolf Magazine. No. 21. p. 20.
- Youellis, Kevin C. (July–August 1993). "Battle and Alamaze". Paper Mayhem. No. 61. p. 31.
