= Earthwood (game) =

Play-by-mail fantasy wargame

- Designers: Bill Feild; Peter Stassun
- Publishers: Game Systems Inc. (US), KJC Games (UK)
- Years active: April 1, 1981 to unknown
- Genres: fantasy wargame
- Languages: English
- Players: 25
- Playing time: Fixed
- Materials required: Instructions, order sheets, turn results, paper, pencil
- Media type: Play-by-mail

Earthwood is a closed-ended, computer moderated, play-by-mail (PBM) fantasy wargame.

== History and development ==
Earthwood was a fantasy wargame published by Game Systems Inc. (GSI). GSI's Bill Feild and Peter Stassun introduced it as their first game when opening on April 1, 1981. The game was closed-ended and computer moderated. The game proved to be popular in the U.K. and the U.S., but when introduced to Australia in 1986, only received a lukewarm reception.

By 1988, Game Systems Inc. created a new version of the game called Earthwood-Sea Kings due to the popularity of Earthwood.

== Gameplay ==
=== Setting ===
The game is set on a 32 x 27 square grid map covered with various types of terrain. Players are given a map at the start of the game, but the map has errors that the players will only discover as they explore. The map contains 30–40 cities.

=== Gameplay ===
Each game has 25 players who role-play three types of characters: 16 kings, five warriors and four magicians. Kings rule cities populated with one of various fantasy races such as elves and dwarves. Players can encounter up to 12 types of non-player characters in the game, to fight, interact, and enlist as party members. Economics is not a significant part of the game, but diplomacy plays a key part — critic DeAnn Iwan stated that the game involved "intense diplomacy".

=== Victory conditions ===
The purpose of the game is to conquer all the game's cities, which can be accomplished with allies. Games could last 30–40 turns.

== Reception ==
In Issue 1 of Fantasy Gamer (August–September 1983), David Ladyman commented "In sum, I recommend Earthwood with reservations. You get a lot of decision-making and player interaction for your money, especially if you start passing messages early and keep the note cards moving. You'll find much more profit in negotiation than in confrontation; the difficulty comes in deciding when a neighbor has become more of a liability than an asset. There will be frustrating rule restrictions; if you insist on strict logic in all your games, you might avoid Earthwood for this reason. At $3 a turn, however, I find myself paying as little as 50 cents an hour for very engrossing entertainment (not counting phone bills, of course!)."

Nicky Palmer, writing for Flagship, recommended the game, highlighting its diplomatic aspects.

In Issue 21 of the Australian game magazine Breakout!, Kevin Flynn noted, "Cities are the key to the game. Cities produce food, armour and gold, and are very hard to take once developed and the walls built to maximum strength. Players spend much of their time exploring for them, conquering them and defending them, and as there are so many around victory is not easily obtainable." Flynn concluded, "The winning player will need to manage his logistics, glean information from his and other players’ moves and be a diplomat extraordinaire."

In White Wolf #10, Stewart Wieck called it "a very enjoyable game", rating it a 5 of 10 points for Strategy, 7 points for Materials and Diplomacy, 8 for Moderation, and 7 points overall.

== See also ==
- List of play-by-mail games

== Bibliography ==
- Editors (February–March 1990). "Fantasy Realms of Play-by-Mail: Earthwood; Original". White Wolf. No. 19. p. 48.
- Iwan, DeAnn (July–August 1986). "From the Scrolls of the Strategist 's Guild: Who is Really Strongest in Earthwood". Paper Mayhem. No. 19. pp. 45–46.
- McLain, Bob (November–December 1983). "Gamealog: Earthwood". PBM Universal. No. 1. p. 28.
- Palmer, Nicky (Autumn 1985). "Earthwood: The Fantasy Wargame". Flagship. No. 8. pp. 13–15.
- Wieck, Stewart (1988). "The PBM Reviews: Earthwood-Sea Kings". White Wolf. No. 10. pp. 53–54.
- Webber, David (March–April 1987). "Inside Game Systems, Inc". Paper Mayhem. No. 23. p. 30.
