= List of programs broadcast by Hero =

This is a list of anime and tokusatsu programs broadcast on the defunct Filipino television channel Hero. All television programs listed below are dubbed in Filipino as the channel was only broadcast in the Philippines.

The list excludes anime films and OVAs shown in Hero's weekend anime movie block, Theatrixx.

Each anime is listed with its most notable/original title with the channel's designation, year of airing and other notes in the parentheses.

== Final Programming ==
The final programming list as of January 31, 2018.

*: First Philippine airing on the channel

- Chaika - The Coffin Princess*
- Naruto: Shippuden (Season 8)
- Himouto! Umaru-chan* (as Umaru-chan)
- Log Horizon*
- All Out!!*
- Food Wars: Shokugeki no Soma*
- Anohana: The Flower We Saw That Day* (as "Anohana")
- Bodacious Space Pirates*
- Fantasista Doll*
- Love Live! School Idol Project* (Season 2)
- Ultimate Otaku Teacher*
- Kuroko's Basketball (Season 3)
- Yu-Gi-Oh! Arc-V* (first season only)

== Other titles ==
^{+}: First aired on different channel in the Philippines and dubbed in English

- .hack//Legend of the Twilight*
- 91 Days*
- Absolutely Lovely Children*
- Active Raid*
- Ah! My Goddess
- AI Football GGO
- Akame ga Kill!*
- Akazukin Chacha
- AM Driver*
- Angelic Layer
- Animenutes
- AniMYX
- Anti-Magic Academy: The 35th Test Platoon*
- Ao Haru Ride*
- Aquarion*
- Aquarion Evol*
- Arakawa Under the Bridge*
- Arjuna*
- Astro Boy (1980)
- Astro Boy (2003)
- Atashin'chi*
- Babel II*
- BakéGyamon*
- Baki the Grappler
- Bakugan Battle Brawlers^{+}
- Bakugan Battle Brawlers: New Vestroia^{+}
- Barom-1*
- BASToF Lemon
- Beautiful Bones: Sakurako's Investigation*
- Beetleborgs Metallix
- BB-Daman Bakugaiden V* (a Bomberman anime)
- BECK: Mongolian Chop Squad*
- Beet the Vandel Buster
- Beyblade^{+}
- Beyblade G-Revolution
- Beyblade V-Force
- Big Bad Beetleborgs
- Big Mouth Dudu
- BIMA Satria Garuda
- Blood Lad*
- Blue Dragon^{+}
- Bodacious Space Pirates*
- Bokura ga Ita*
- Bubbles
- Bubu Chacha
- Bucky the Incredible Kid*
- Buddy Complex*
- Burst Angel*
- Buzzer Beater
- Captain Earth*
- Captain Kuppa*
- Captain Tsubasa* (2001 version)
- Casshern Sins
- Cat's Eye
- Ceres, Celestial Legend*
- Cheeky Angel
- Chess Master
- Chrono Crusade*
- Cinderella Boy*
- Class of the Titans
- Claymore*
- Cluster Edge*
- Code-E*
- Code Geass
- Combattler V
- Corrector Yui*
- Cosmo Warrior Zero*
- Cowboy Bebop
- Cromartie High School*
- Crush Gear Nitro^{+}
- Crush Gear Turbo^{+}
- Crystal Warrior
- Cuticle Detective Inaba'*
- Cyborg 009 (2001 version)
- D. C.: Da Capo* (first season only)
- D.Gray-man
- D.N.Angel
- Daigunder*
- Daily Lives of High School Boys*
- Daimos^{+}
- Daltanious^{+}
- Dash! Yonkuro*
- Date A Live*
- Dear Boys
- Death Note*
- Deltora Quest^{+}
- Demon Lord Dante*
- Devil May Cry: The Animated Series*
- Devil Survivor 2: The Animation*
- D.I.C.E.*
- Di-Gata Defenders
- Digimon Adventure^{+}
- Digimon Adventure 02^{+}
- Digimon Frontier^{+}
- Digimon Savers
- Digimon Tamers^{+}
- Digimon Xros Wars*
- Dragon Collection*
- Dragon Crisis!*
- Duel Masters
- El Hazard The Mysterious World (The Wonderers)
- Elemental Gerad
- Element Hunters*
- Energy Bomb [Gamburgar]*
- Eternal Alice*
- Eureka Seven*
- Eyeshield 21
- Fate/kaleid liner Prisma Illya*
- Fate/kaleid liner Prisma Illya 2wei!*
- Fate/kaleid liner Prisma Illya 3rei!*
- Fate/Zero*
- Folktales from Japan*
- Fortune Quest
- Forza! Mario
- Free!*
- Free!: Eternal Summer*
- Fruits Basket
- Full Metal Panic!
- Full Metal Panic? Fumoffu
- Cyber Formula GPX*
- G³ (G-cubed)
- GA Geijutsuka Art Design Class*
- Gadget Boy
- Gakuen Utopia Manabi Straight!*
- Galaxia Bots
- Galaxy Angel
- Gargoyle of Yoshinaga Family*
- Gargantia on the Verdurous Planet*
- Gash Bell!* (first season only)
- Gatchaman
- Gate Keepers
- Genma Wars*
- Gensomaden Saiyuki
- GetBackers
- Ghost Hunt*
- G.I. Joe: Sigma 6
- Giant Killing*
- Giant Robo*
- Gintama (Season 1 to 5)
- Gintama': Enchōsen*
- Godannar*
- Gosaurer*
- Gourmet Girl Graffiti*
- Grimgar of Fantasy and Ash*
- Gun Frontier*
- Gundam SEED Destiny^{+}
- Haikyu!!
- Hakkenden: Eight Dogs of the East*
- Hakuoki*
- Hana Yori Dango
- Hanasaku Iroha*
- Hani Hani*
- Happiness!*
- Hareluya Boy*
- Haruka
- Heaven's Memo Pad*
- Hero Zone on ABS-CBN (2006–2009)
- Heroic Age*
- Heroman*
- Hetalia: Axis Powers*
- Hetalia: The Beautiful World*
- Hetalia: World Series*
- Hikarian*
- Himouto! Umaru-chan*
- His and Her Circumstances
- Hitman Reborn!
- Hunter × Hunter (1999 TV series; 2002 OVA only)
- Ikkitousen*
- Inazuma Eleven
- Initial D^{+}
  - Initial D: First Stage^{+}
  - Initial D: Second Stage
  - Initial D: Third Stage
  - Initial D: Fourth Stage
  - Initial D: Fifth Stage*
- Innocent Venus*
- Inspector Fabre*
- Inuyasha
- Ironman 28
- Ixion Saga DT*
- Izumo*
- Jackie Chan's Fantasia
- Janperson
- Jester, the Adventurer
- Jigoku Shoujo*
- Jinki: Extend*
- Justirisers
- Kamisama Dolls*
- Karneval*
- Kekkaishi*
- Keijo!!!!!!!! Hip Whip Girl*
- Kiba
- Kimba the White Lion* (1989; not to be confused with the 1966 coloured English dub first seen on ABC 5)
- Knight Hunters
- Knights of Remune NG*
- Knights of Ramune VS*
- Kobato*
- Koi Koi Seven*
- Kokoro Connect*
- KonoSuba*
- Kōtetsu Sangokushi*
- Knock Out (2000 and 2009 TV series; excluding OVA)
- Kurozuka*
- Kyo Kara Maoh!*
- Kyōran Kazoku Nikki*
- Last Exile
- Lemon Angel Project*
- Level Up TV
- Leviathan: The Last Defense*
- Lost Universe
- Love Hina
- Lovely Idol*
- Love Live! Sunshine!!*
- Maburaho*
- Machine Robo Rescue^{+}
- Magic Kaito 1412
- Magical Canan*
- Majestic Prince*
- Major*
- Mamotte! Lollipop*
- Mars the Terminator*
- Masked Rider 555
- Masked Rider Blade
- Masked Rider Decade
- Masked Rider Den-O
- Masked Rider: Dragon Knight
- Masked Rider Fourze
- Masked Riser Gaim
- Masked Rider Hibiki
- Masked Rider Kabuto
- Masked Rider Kiva
- Masked Rider OOO
- Masked Rider Ryuki
- Masked Rider W
- Masked Rider Wizard
- Mask Man
- Master of Epic
- Melody of Oblivion*
- Mermaid Forest*
- Metal Fighter Miku
- Michiko & Hatchin*
- Mirmo de Pon!*
- Mission-E*
- Mister Ajikko*
- Mix Master
- Mobile Suit Gundam
- Mobile Suit Gundam 00
- Mobile Suit Gundam AGE^{+}
- Mobile Suit Gundam SEED^{+}
- Mon-Colle Knights
- Monkey Magic^{+}
- Monkey Turn*
- Monkey Turn V*
- Monkey Typhoon^{+}
- Monster*
- Monster Rancher
- Monsuno
- Moomin* (Japanese TV version)
- Musashi*
- Musumet*
- My Bride Is a Mermaid*
- My Hero Nation
- Mystic Knights of Tir Na Nog
- My Melody*
- Mythic Warriors
- Mythical Detective Loki
- Najica Blitz Tactics*
- Naruto
- Needless*
- Negima!* (the Xebec version)
- Negima!? (season 2)* (Shaft version)
- New Attacker You!
- Ninja Boy Rantaro
- Nobunagun*
- Nogizaka Haruka no Himitsu*
- Offside*
- One Outs*
- One Week Friends*
- Orange*
- Oreca Battle*
- Otogi Zoshi*
- Ouran High School Host Club*
- Over Drive*
- Pandora in the Crimson Shell: Ghost Urn*
- Pani Poni Dash*
- Peacemaker*
- Persona: Trinity Soul*
- Phantom ~Requiem for the Phantom~*
- Popolocrois (second series)
- Power Rangers Series
  - Power Rangers Wild Force
  - Power Rangers Ninja Storm
  - Power Rangers Dino Thunder
  - Power Rangers S.P.D.
  - Power Rangers Mystic Force
  - Power Rangers Operation Overdrive
  - Power Rangers Jungle Fury
  - Power Rangers RPM
  - Power Rangers Samurai
  - Power Rangers Megaforce
  - Power Rangers Dino Charge
- Prétear
- Pretty Cure*
- Princess Resurrection*
- Project ARMS
- Project Blue*
- Ragnarok the Animation
- RahXephon*
- Railgun*
- Raijin-Oh^{+}
- Ran: The Samurai Girl*
- Randy Cunningham: 9th Grade Ninja
- Rockman EXE
- Rockman EXE Axess*
- Rumbling Hearts*
- Rune Soldier
- Ryukendo
- Special A
- Sailor Moon
- Sailor Moon R
- Sailor Moon S
- Saiyuki Reload
- Saiyuki Reload Gunlock
- Samurai Deeper Kyo
- Samurai X^{+}
- Sasami*
- Say I Love You*
- Sazer-X
- School Rumble*
- Scrapped Princess
- SD Gundam Force^{+}
- Shaider (2006–2009)
- Shaman King
- Shattered Angels* (original name: Kyoshiro and the Eternal Sky)
- Shen Bing Kids
- Shigofumi: Letters from the Departed*
- Shiki*
- Shin Mazinger Edition Z
- Shura no Toki*
- Skull Man*
- Slayers
  - Slayers Next
  - Slayers Try
  - Slayers Revolution*
  - Slayers Evolution-R*
- Sorcerer Hunters
- Sorcerer Orphen
  - Sorcerer Orphen Revenge
- Soul Eater
- Soul Hunter
- Soul Link*
- Space Brothers*
- Spider Riders*
- Star-Myu: High School Star Musical*
- Starship Operators*
- Storm Hawks
- Street Fighter II V
- Sugar: A Little Snow Fairy
- Sugar Sugar Rune
- Sunny Pig
- Super Doll Licca
- Super Gals
- Superhuman Samurai Syber-Squad
- Super Inggo at ang Super Tropa
- Super Yoyo
- Susie and Marvy*
- Suzuka*
- Tactics
- Tanaka-kun Is Always Listless*
- Tank Knights Portriss
- Taro the Space Alien*
- Tattooed Teenage Alien Fighters from Beverly Hills
- Tenjho Tenge
- The Asterisk War*
- The Count of Monte Cristo*
- The Devil Is a Part-Timer!*
- The Eccentric Family*
- The Eden of Grisaia*
- The Familiar of Zero*
- The Fruit of Grisaia*
- The Good Witch of the West*
- The Heroic Legend of Arslan*
- The Legend of Ne Zha
- The Legend of the Legendary Heroes*
- The Marshmallow Times* (Korean name: Raspberry Times)
- The Prince of Tennis
- The Twelve Kingdoms
- The Xtreme Team*
- Three-Eyed One*
- Those Who Hunt Elves
- Tide-Line Blue*
- Tiger & Bunny*
- Toaru Majutsu no Index*
- Tokyo Magnitude 8.0*
- Tokyo Underground
- Transformers: Armada
- Transformers: Cybertron*
- Trigun
- Ultraman Cosmos
- Ultraman Max
- Ultraman Mebius
- Ultraman Nexus
- Ultraman Tiga
- Ultraviolet: Code 044*
- Ursula's Kiss*
- Utawarerumono*
- Vampire Knight*
- Vandread*
- Viewtiful Joe*
- Voltes V Evolution^{+}
- Voltron
- VR Troopers
- Wandaba Style*
- Wind: A Breath of Heart*
- Wings of Dragon
- Working!!* (Season 1 and 2)
- Wulong*
- Yakitate!! Japan*
- Yamada and the Seven Witches*
- Your Lie in April*
- You're Under Arrest* (first season only; excluding OVAs)
- Yowamushi Pedal* (first season only)
- Yu-Gi-Oh! Duel Monsters^{+}
- Yu-Gi-Oh! 5D's
- Yu-Gi-Oh! GX*
- Yu-Gi-Oh! Zexal
- Yuki Yuna Is a Hero*
- Yumeiro Patissiere*
- Yuyushiki*
- Zenki*
- Zevo-3
- Zoids: Genesis*
- Zorori*
