= Duel Masters Trading Card Game =

Collectible card game

- The card back of the Duel Masters TCG
- Designers: Mike Elliott, Charlie Catino, and Tyler Bielman
- Publishers: Wizards of the Coast (worldwide); Takara (2002-2006); TakaraTomy (Japan, 2006-present)
- Players: 2 or 4
- Playing time: Approx 20 min
- Chance: Some
- Skills: Card playing Arithmetic; Basic Reading Ability; Strategy

The Duel Masters Trading Card Game is a two-player or two vs. two team collectible card game (CCG) developed by Wizards of the Coast. The card game is part of the Duel Masters media franchise owned by WotC, Shogakukan and ShoPro.

The game was released in Japan in May 2002, where it quickly became the number one selling trading card game for over a year. Owing to this popularity, it was released in the United States on March 5, 2004. The game shares several similarities with Magic: The Gathering, the world's first collectible card game, which was also published by Wizards of the Coast. In fact, Duel Masters was originally intended as an alternative tradename for Magic: The Gathering and the earlier game play was abandoned in the Duel Masters manga plot to promote this latest experience.

In Japan, the card sets are manufactured by TakaraTomy under license from WotC.

== Timeline ==
As in Magic: The Gathering, Duel Masters players summon creatures and cast spells using mana. Key differences include the fact that all creatures and spells can act as mana producers, creatures cannot block attacking creatures without having the “blocker” ability, and that creatures only have one “power” statistic. Furthermore, duelists have shields in the form of cards that go to their hand when “broken” as opposed to Magic's “life points”. Owing to the popularity of Duel Masters, four video games (three released for the Game Boy Advance and the other for the PS2) based around the game have been produced, titled Duel Masters: Kaijudo Showdown, Duel Masters: Sempai Legends, Duel Masters: Shadow of the Code for the GBA and Duel Masters: Cobalt for the PS2.

As of December 2006, the English sets of Duel Masters were discontinued by Wizards of the Coast due to weak sales. In June 2012, Wizards of the Coast relaunched Duel Masters for the western market, under a new franchise named Kaijudo: Rise of the Duel Masters. Based on the existing Duel Masters brand, Kaijudo featured an online game, trading card game, and a television series. In 2014, the company announced they would stop production of the paper version of the game in the United States.

As of 2025, the game is still published in Japan by Takara Tomy where it's one of the most popular trading card games.

== Gameplay ==
In Duel Masters, two players play the role of duelists, using the "art" of "kaijudo" (a marketing term created for the North American version which supposedly describes the "art of battling with giant monsters," from the Japanese words kaiju, strange beast or giant monster, and do, way or art) to bring their creatures to life to do battle. Players battle each other by placing cards into their respective "mana zones," then using that mana to cast spells or summon creatures into the "battle zone."

Each player has five shields that protect them from damage; once these are gone, it takes one successful attack to win the duel. When a player's deck runs out of cards, that player automatically loses the duel.

Each player's deck must have a minimum of 40 cards in it. As with all trading card games, players construct their own decks out of cards from their collection. Players can purchase booster packs to increase the number of cards they have in their collection. Boosters are available in English for the first 12 DM-series sets, and Japanese for each expansion set released.

== Reception ==
The Journal Star reviewed Duelmasters Trading Card Game: Stomp-A-Trons of Invincible Wrath and said that "The game is great for veteran fans of the game and is also a perfect way to introduce new players to the game."
