= G&G Entertainment =

South Korean animation studio

- Company type: Private
- Industry: Animation Studio
- Founded: May 15, 2000
- Founder: Geukpo Jeong
- Website: http://www.gngmovie.com/

G&G Entertainment (Korean: (주)지앤지엔터테인먼트) is a South Korean animation studio which creates animation for the domestic South Korean and Japanese anime markets. The main studio, which is credited as G&G Entertainment, is located in South Korea, while the Japanese subsidiary studio, which is credited as G&G Direction, assists the main studio and aids in getting outsource work from other Japanese studios. G&G Entertainment is known for its collaboration with the Japanese animation studio Gonzo, with which they have produced their most successful series to date, Kaleido Star. Increasingly, the studio is also seeking collaborations with Chinese studios, particularly for the creation of computer animation productions.

== TV series ==
=== Original productions ===
- Ragnarok The Animation (2004) (Collaboration with GONZO)
- Mask Man (2005)
- Lala's Star Diary (2007)
- Tuktakman (2017)

=== Collaboration with Japanese studios ===
- Kaleido Star (2003) (collaboration with GONZO)
- Jinzo Konchu Kabuto Borg VxV (2006) (collaboration with Studio Comet)
- Kirarin Revolution (2006) (collaboration with Synergy SP)
- Duel Masters Flash (2006) (collaboration with Synergy SP)

=== Collaborations with Chinese studios ===
- Little Wizard Tao (2007) (collaborations with Motion Magic Digital Studios)

=== As a support (Overseas) studio for Japanese productions ===
- SaiKano (2002) (digital paint)
- ARIA The ANIMATION (2005) (secondary key animation, digital paint)
- Jinzo Konchu Kabuto Borg VXV (2006)

== Original video animations (OVAs) ==
=== Original productions ===
- Sorry, I Love You (2006)
- Bug Fighter (2007)

== Theatrical films ==
=== Original productions ===
- Olympus Guardian (2003)

=== As a support (Overseas) studio for Japanese productions ===
- Pokémon Heroes - Latias & Latios (2002) (animation assistance)
