= Kaijudo =

- Also known as: Kaijudo: Rise of the Duel Masters (season 1); Kaijudo: Clash of the Duel Masters (season 2)
- Created by: Michael Fisher; Joshua O'Hare
- Based on: Duel Masters by Shigenobu Matsumoto
- Developed by: Henry Gilroy (season 1); Andrew R. Robinson (seasons 1–2); Marty Isenberg (season 2)
- Voices of: Scott Wolf; Phil LaMarr; Kari Wahlgren
- Theme music composer: John Jennings Boyd; Eric V. Hachikan
- Composers: Michael McCuistion; Lolita Ritmanis; Kristopher Carter; Carl Johnson
- Country of origin: United States
- Original language: English
- No. of seasons: 2
- No. of episodes: 52 (list of episodes)

Production
- Executive producer: Stephen Davis
- Producers: Gary Hartle; Haven Alexander
- Animator: Moi Animation
- Running time: 22 minutes
- Production company: Hasbro Studios
- Budget: US$400,000 (per episode)

Original release
- Network: Hub Network
- Release: May 5, 2012 – December 28, 2013

Kaijudo is an American animated series and trading card game that serve as a spin-off and relaunch of the Japanese Duel Masters franchise. The animated series was produced by Hasbro Studios, animated by Moi Animation in South Korea, and developed by Henry Gilroy and Andrew R. Robinson for Wizards of the Coast.

Previously, Hasbro Entertainment licensed and produced an English-language adaptation of the 2002 Duel Masters anime series in 2004. Wizards of the Coast also launched the companion Duel Masters Trading Card Game in the United States in the same year; the series would eventually be discontinued in 2006.

Kaijudo premiered on the Hub Network, a joint venture between Hasbro and Discovery, on May 5, 2012 and ended on December 28, 2013. The companion trading card game was issued by Wizards of the Coast and first released on June 26, 2012. The franchise was discontinued in 2014, with the TV series cancelled after its second season.

== Plot ==
The series follows the adventures of a teenage boy named Ray Okamoto from San Campion who possesses the rare ability to summon and duel alongside fantastical creatures from a parallel dimension. Ray and his two best friends Allie and Gabe join the ranks of the mysterious Duel Masters to ensure the survival of both races.

== Characters ==
- Raiden "Ray" Pierce-Okamoto (voiced by Scott Wolf) is the half-Japanese main protagonist of the series who is the son of Ken Okamoto and Janet Pierce-Okamoto. He lives on the central California coast in the city of San Campion with his mom and paternal grandfather. His creature partner is Tatsurion the Unchained. Raiden's natural ability to befriend the creatures comes from his father Ken Okamoto (who The Choten converted into Saguru) and his birth in the Creature Realms when Ken and Janet were hiding in the Nature Civilization from The Choten.
- Allison "Allie" Underhill (voiced by Kari Wahlgren) is one of Ray's best friend since their childhood, she has a wealthy father but does not act like a stereotypical rich girl. She is fiercely independent and extremely adventurous. Her creature partner is Scaradorable of Gloom Hollow.
- Gabriel "Gabe" Wallace (voiced by Phil LaMarr) is one of Ray's best friend he is more direct than most people, but is honest and true. His creature partner is Reef Prince Glu-urrgle. He later meets Sasha, Channeler of Light who becomes his second partner. Following the fight at The Choten's base and the treachery of Master Nigel, Gabe is later chosen as the temporary Duel Master of the Light Civilization (due to his connection with Sasha) until the Duel Masters can find a suitable replacement for Nigel.

== Episodes ==
Season	Episodes	First aired	Last aired
1	26	May 5, 2012	December 15, 2012
2	26	June 21, 2013	December 28, 2013

== Home media ==
Shout! Factory began releasing the series in December 2012. United Kingdom-based Clear Vision has rights for the first two seasons through Region 2, including most of Western Europe and the Middle East.

Region	DVD title	Episodes	Time length	Release date
1	Creatures Unleashed	1–5	110 minutes	December 4, 2012
1	Dragonstrike	6, 7, 23, 25, 26	110 minutes	April 30, 2013
1	Darkness of Heart	8, 9, 18, 19, 20	110 minutes	September 24, 2013
