= List of Kaijudo episodes =

This is a list of episodes for Kaijudo, an American animated television series created by Hasbro Studios. It premiered on May 5, 2012 and ended on December 28, 2013.

== Series overview ==
Season	Episodes	First aired	Last aired
1	26	May 5, 2012	December 15, 2012
2	26	June 21, 2013	December 28, 2013

== Episodes ==
=== Season 1 (Kaijudo: Rise of the Duel Masters, 2012) ===
No.	Title	Directed by	Written by	Original release date
1–3	"The Natural"	Gary Hartle; Hoon Jeong; Kijune Kim	Henry S. Gilroy; Andrew R. Robinson	May 5, 2012
Part 1: Ray and his friends are introduced to the world of the Kaijudo Duel Masters, a secret order of heroes who protect mankind from the creatures from the other side of the veil. They also learn that a former Duel Master called the Choten is planning to use every creature he has obtained in order to take over the world. Part 2: Ray, Gabe, and Allie explore the Kaijudo Temple and learn the basics of creature dueling from the Duel Masters and the acolyte Joseph "Fingers" (who is secretly one of the Choten's followers). Part 3: Ray, Gabe, and Allie go to the Temple Stables to find Fingers accidentally releasing a deadly Flametropus while collecting some creature tablets.
4	"Om Nom Nom"	Gary Hartle; Kijune Kim	Kevin Hopps	June 23, 2012
The kids must track and banish a small creature called Blaze Belcher back to its realm. But when the Choten mutates the creature and it starts to duplicate itself, things get complicated. Meanwhile, Gabe has problems controlling his new primary creature Gargle. Later the Blaze Belcher combine to create a new creature called Om Nom Nom.
5	"The Hunted"	Gary Hartle; Hoon Jeong	Brandon Auman	June 30, 2012
After rescuing Little Hissy (a baby Legionnaire Lizard) from Alakshmi, Ray and his friends hide out at school, but are soon caught up in a dangerous game of hide-and-seek with Alakshmi and her vicious creature Razorkinder Puppet of Miasma Pit. Meanwhile, Ray teaches Tatsurion the Unchained about the meaning of "friend".
6	"Into the Fire, Part 1"	Gary Hartle; Kijune Kim	Joseph Kuhr	July 7, 2012
Allie gets pulled into the Fire Civilization by a banished Snaptongue Lizard; Ray and Gabe launch an unsanctioned rescue mission. A mysterious stranger helps Ray, Tatsurion, and Gabe find Allie and a creature named Squeaky when they are captured by the soldiers of Lord Skycrusher. Tatsurion reveals he is of 2 civilizations like Ray: Fire and Nature.
7	"Into the Fire, Part 2"	Gary Hartle; Kijune Kim	Eugene Son	July 14, 2012
The stranger turns out to be a bounty hunter named Saguru and delivers the kids to Lord Skycrusher. Tatsurion invokes his right to trial by combat and Ray and Allie are his opponents. Ray helps Tatsurion to use his Nature side to resist the mind control of Skycrusher's sword called the Sword of Fiery Cataclysm. Everyone manages to escape, while Saguru steals the Sword of Fiery Cataclysm and delivers it to the Choten for a slight look at Earth.
8	"Shaw K'Naw"	Gary Hartle; Kijune Kim	Len Uhley	July 21, 2012
A series of strange robberies has been hitting the city. Ray, Allie, and Gabe discover that a thug named Heller is behind the robberies and has been using a gauntlet that he stole from the Choten's men to control a Storm Patrol creature called Shaw K'Naw. During the battle, Ray is temporary blinded and Master Jaha ends up having to train him to use his other senses to see while working with a Tarborg creature called Fumes.
9	"The Taken"	Gary Hartle; Hoon Jeong	Brandon Auman	July 28, 2012
Ray and his pals help Master Kimora probe some mysterious disappearances occurring in Mighty Shouter's tribe. Upon being caught by a claw emerging from the portal, Ray and Tatsurion discover that the Choten and Aqua Seneschal are behind the abductions. Now Ray must find a way to free Tatsurion and the other captives of the Choten without being discovered by Alakshmi and Fingers.
10	"The Siphon"	Gary Hartle; Kijune Kim	Mark Hoffmeier	August 11, 2012
The kids try to stop Alakshmi, Fingers, and Heller from obtaining the mana which Master Chavez needs to replenish the Veil to keep the Fire Civilization King from awakening.
11	"The Deep End, Part 1"	Gary Hartle; Hoon Jeong	Todd Garfield	August 18, 2012
Upon infiltrating Ray's house, the Choten and Aqua Seneschal use a bunch of Memory Swarm to steal all of Ray's memories of Kaijudo. It's up to Allie & Gabe to get them back by traveling into the Water Civilization for the backup located within the Mother Virus associated with the Memory Swarm. Yet they soon get caught upon being accused of stealing a Water Civilization artifact called the Helm of Ultimate Technology (an artifact that can read as well as control the minds of every creature in the Water Civilization) and are brought before the Council of Logos.
12	"The Deep End, Part 2"	Gary Hartle; Hoon Jeong	Tom Pugsley; Greg Klein	August 25, 2012
Narrowly escaping the Water Civilization rulers after being accused of stealing their Helm of Ultimate Technology, the kids team up with Gabe's creature Gargle to prove that the Choten is guilty and to stop him from getting away with his crime even when Alaksmi summons Magmadragon Melgars using the Sword of Fiery Cataclysm.
13	"The Last of His Kind"	Gary Hartle; Hoon Jeong	Johnny Hartmann	September 15, 2012
On a mission to hunt down a creature known as Roaming Bloodmane, Ray, Gabe, Allie, Master Kimora, and Master Jaha quickly discover there is far more to the beast than meets the eye. When Master Kimora and Master Jaha are captured in a water-filled death trap, Master Nigel, Master Nadia, and Master Chavez are called out to fight Roaming Bloodmane.
14	"Night Moves"	Gary Hartle; Kijune Kim	Ross Berger	September 22, 2012
Allie has a sleepover to ease the tension among her friends, but Alakshmi crashes the sleepover with Gorgeon, Shadow of Gluttony.
15	"The Nature of Things, Part 1"	Gary Hartle; Hoon Jeong	Marty Isenberg	September 29, 2012
Ray and Tatsurion duel in an arena competition for the Shield of Unity (an artifact that compels all other tribes to help whichever tribe possesses it) in order to help Gabe, Master Chavez, and Earthstomp Giant protect the Quillspike Tribe from the attacks by Midnight Crawler. While watching the battle, Allie notices that the Choten is in the audience and discovers he has created a plot to steal the Shield of Unity with Saguru posing as a Snow Faerie.
16	"The Nature of Things, Part 2"	Gary Hartle; Hoon Jeong	Jack Monaco	October 6, 2012
Ray and Tatsurion the Unchained must race Saguru and those in the finals to get to the Shield of Unity. When the Shield of Unity is stolen by Aqua Seneschal, Ray and Tatsurion the Unchained end up working with Saguru to recover the Shield of Unity. Meanwhile, Gabe, Master Chavez, and Gargle try to find a way to get out of Midnight Crawler and find a way to prevent it from eating more of the Quillspike Tribe's land.
17	"A Light in the Darkness"	Gary Hartle; Hoon Jeong	Josh Haber	October 13, 2012
Gabe follows his brothers to an abandoned amusement park at the old pier while tutoring them. Meanwhile, Fingers uses Impalicus (which Choten evolved from a Writhing Bone Ghoul) to target Gabe in order to find Ray. Now Gabe is put to the ultimate test to keep his brothers from getting attacked by Impalicus before they see it.
18	"Duel Hard"	Gary Hartle; Kijune Kim	Mark Hoffmeier	October 20, 2012
Ray and Allie end up in a high-stakes battle of wits against Alakshmi, Heller, and Saguru when the Choten makes another attempt at stealing the Helm of Ultimate Technology which has been hidden in the bank where Allie's father Arthur Underhill works. Gabe also alerts the other Masters in order to save the hostages and help to fight off the Choten's minions.
19	"Heart of Darkness, Part 1"	Gary Hartle; Hoon Jeong	Marty Isenberg	October 27, 2012
Following the incident at the bank, Master Jaha, Master Chavez, and Master Nadia leads an expedition to the Darkness Civilization to rescue Allie's father and endures multiple attacks. They soon learn from Master Jaha's contact Slyth that Arthur Underhill is in the clutches of Megaria, the Collector.
20	"Heart of Darkness, Part 2"	Gary Hartle; Hoon Jeong	Joseph Kuhr	November 3, 2012
With Allie a prisoner of Megaria, Ray and the others formulate a plan to rescue Allie and return home with the Shield of Unity. Meanwhile, Alakshmi enters the Darkness Civilization in order to redeem herself to Choten and claim the Shield of Unity only for Megaria to have Razorkinder Puppet of Miasma Pit knock out Alakshmi. Now Megaria has Allie and Alakshmi fight each other to see who will become her pawn in a plot to expand her territory.
21	"Like Father, Like Son"	Gary Hartle; Hoon Jeong	Josh Haber; Henry S. Gilroy	November 10, 2012
While trying to teach Carny a lesson following an incident at a parent-teacher conference, Ray and Tatsurion the Unchained find themselves stuck in the Fire Civilization with Carny and they must work together find their way back to Earth while evading Lord Skycusher's bounty hunters Blastforge Slavetrader and Burnclaw the Relentless. During this time, Ray ends up making a discovery about Carny's dad Alex where it turns out that Alex is one of Choten's benefactors and even learns more about Tatsurion the Unchained's father Napalmian the Conquering.
22	"The Unbearable Being of Lightness"	Gary Hartle; Kijune Kim	Todd Garfield	November 17, 2012
Sasha, Channeler of Light returns to Earth upon being sent by the Light Civilization to study humans. While in a mortal disguise, Sasha is introduced to mean attitudes, cyber-bullies, and powerful emotions. All of this makes her question the humanity of humankind. At the same time, Alakshmi trains Carny to duel like her. Note: During the production of this episode, Andrew R. Robinson ended up voice directing this episode instead of Jamie Thomason.
23	"Heavenly Creatures"	Gary Hartle; Hoon Jeong	Marty Isenberg	November 24, 2012
Master Nigel has sent the other Duel Masters and Acolytes to look for Choten's hideout. Sasha, Channeler of Light sends a message to Gabe that the Light Civilization is under attack. The kids and Master Nigel travel to the Light Civilization to find Alakshmi (wielding the Sword of Fiery Cataclysm), Fingers (wielding the Cloak of Dark Illusion), and Heller (wielding the Shield of Unity) attempting to steal the final powerful artifact called the Heart of Light where the artifacts that Choten's minions wield act as a compass to the Heart of Light.
24	"Betrayal"	Gary Hartle; Kijune Kim	Johnny Hartmann	December 1, 2012
The Choten, Alakshmi, Fingers, Saguru, and Heller attack Ray’s apartment to get the fifth and final Creature Artifact. Making matters worse, The Choten activates a Summoning Inhibitor that prevents anyone or anything from crossing through the Veil within the targeted perimeter. During this time, Ray learns about his mother's past and what his father Ken was.
25	"The Rising, Part 1"	Gary Hartle; Hoon Jeong	Henry S. Gilroy	December 8, 2012
Now that the Choten has all five artifacts, he begins his plan to collapse the Veil and awaken the 5 Creature Kings. Ray, Gabe, and Allie escape from the Creature Realm and help the Duel Masters launch an attack on Choten's lair unaware that the Choten is prepared for their arrival by abducting Tatsurion the Unchained and the creature partners of the Duel Masters. Tatsurion the Unchained evolves into Evo Fury Tatsurion and grows wings. The Choten successfully awakens King Tritonus (the monarch of the Water Civilization).
26	"The Rising, Part 2"	Gary Hartle; Kijune Kim	Henry S. Gilroy; Andrew R. Robinson	December 15, 2012
As The Choten's plan appears to be falling into place upon awakening King Tritonus, Infernus the Immolater, Almighty Colossus, Queen Kalima of the Infinite Dark, and Eternal Haven Angelic Liege, Ray, Gabe, Allie, and the Duel Masters must do everything in their power to save Earth from being changed forever.

=== Season 2 (Kaijudo: Clash of the Duel Masters, 2013) ===
No.	Title	Directed by	Written by	Original release date
27	"The Butterfly Effect"	Frank Squillace	Andrew R. Robinson	June 21, 2013
A war breaks out between the Fire Civilization and the Water Civilization resulting in several bizarre natural disasters occurring in San Campion causing Ray, Gabe, Allie, Master Chavez, and Master Nadia to get involved when a volcano warship from the Fire Civilization attacks a Water Civilization outpost headed up by Corile.
28	"Cease Fire"	Frank Squillace	Marty Isenberg; Andrew R. Robinson	June 28, 2013
Ray and Bob are abducted and taken to a volcano warship run by Lord Skycrusher who confiscates Ray's Duel Guantlet. So a rescue attempt by Finbarr gets underway while the warship is at risk of being attacked when Finbarr gives them one hour before he attacks. Ray finds Alakshmi amongst the slaves in the volcano warship. Even when Ray and Bob are rescued, Allie uses Megaria's mask to arrange a parley between Finbarr and Lord Skycrusher where they meet at Gregoria's Fortress.
29	"Boiling Point"	Frank Squillace	Marty Isenberg	July 5, 2013
Ray and Bob seek to rescue Alakshmi from the volcano warship while reclaiming Bob's weapons and instigating a slave revolt. Meanwhile, King Poseidon (who was seen in Finbarr's memory scan of Lord Skycrusher as having attacked the shores of the Fire Civilization) is investigated by Allie, Gabe, Master Chavez, and Master Nadia as the one that caused the war between the Fire Civilization and the Water Civilization.
30	"Boosted"	Frank Squillace	Joseph Kuhr	July 12, 2013
Upon being promoted to Adepts, Ray, Gabe, and Allie advance to a new training level and get access to the dojo and discover an old spell which temporarily allows their creatures to acquire strange new powers and characteristics. While investigating the incident with the Stalker Spheres not relaying anything to Panopter, Ray, Allie, and Bob discover that Master Nigel is behind the tampering of the Stalker Spheres.
31	"Caught in the Spotlight"	Frank Squillace	Todd Garfield	July 19, 2013
The Choten discusses Alex's plot to be a war profiteer by mass-producing his Evolution Serum. The art of Kaijudo is on the threat of being exposed when photos of Carny and Simian Trooper Grash are leaked onto the Internet by Lucy (who had caught the footage on the phone) and starts getting suspicious. When The Choten learns of the footage, he pins the blame on Carny and sends Fingers and Heller to deal with him. While Allie and Gabe throw off Lucy's suspicion, Ray must work to keep them from taking Carny.
32	"The King's Speech"	Frank Squillace	Greg Weisman	July 26, 2013
When King Tritonus has formed the Loyalty Police, he has Milporo incarcerated for supposedly committing treason. Finbarr enlists Ray, Gabe, and Allie into helping him and Saguru finding out if King Tritonus is under The Choten's control. While the others create a diversion in order to broadcast, Ray, Saguru, and Gargle infiltrate The Choten's ship in order to set up Stalker Spheres. When Gargle ends up captured and the Stalker Spheres are disabled, Ray and Saguru must work to save Gargle from The Choten's control.
33	"Quest in Fire"	Frank Squillace	Brandon Auman	August 2, 2013
Ray, Gabe, and Allie journey into the Fire Civilization to seek out the Fire Mystic's magic that might separate Homonculon from Saguru. Ray suspects that the mysterious person is a Creature Mystic that they encountered on Lord Skycrusher's volcano warship when they learn that the mysterious person (who is trapped in a cursed armor) had also escaped from Alakshmi which leads to a truce to get to the Fire Mystic. Even though Infernus the Immolator has pardoned Tatsurion the Unchained, Lord Skycrusher, Blastforge Slaver, and Burnclaw the Relentless pursue them.
34	"Rising Son"	Frank Squillace	Jonathan Callan	August 9, 2013
Ray goes with his grandfather to Japan where he learns the full details of his family's history. He later encounters a creature called Sniper Mosquito that gets larger from the mana that is absorbed. During his time in Japan and encounter with Sniper Mosquito, Raiden discovers that his great-uncle Isao is associated with Japan's Duel Master Outpost.
35	"Mixed Vegetables"	Frank Squillace	Kevin Hopps	August 16, 2013
The duelists travel to the Nature Civilization to stop an out of control plant growth on both sides of The Veil. They soon discover that the Water Civilization has also declared war on the Nature Civilization at the time when the Wild Veggies Rapscallion, Ninja Pumpkin, and Shaman Broccoli are trying to claim the Quillspike Tribe's harvest for the Wild Veggies. Things get even worse when the Quillspike Tribe's territory is attacked by an upgraded version of Midnight Crawler.
36	"Extracurricular Activities"	Frank Squillace	Johnny Hartmann	August 23, 2013
Ray gets a good job as a waiter at a country club and finally affords a new house for his family to live in. Meanwhile, Fingers and Heller go on a crime spree upon obtaining the horn of a Rumbling Terrasaur which comes in handy for them.
37	"Gargle, Gargle, Toil and Trouble"	Frank Squillace	Rich Fogel	August 30, 2013
While the Duel Masters go to Tierra Fuego to interview a possible successor to Master Nigel Brightmore, Ray investigates strange occurrences at the Carnahan Chemical plant where Alex is distributing the Choten's Evolution Serum. Meanwhile, Gargle visits Gabe’s house for the first time and has to deal with Donald and Ronald. At the same time, Allie's mother Piper returns into Allie's life.
38	"Darkness on the Edge of Town"	Frank Squillace	Joseph Kuhr	September 6, 2013
Having been posing as Piper all along, Megaria tries to take Allie on as her student in the Darkness Civilization. Meanwhile, a tanker full of The Choten's Evolution serum goes missing in the Darkness Civilization upon being abducted by the Darkness Civilization creatures that are loyal to Megaria.
39	"Into the Void"	Frank Squillace	David McDermott	September 20, 2013
Allie's loyalties are tested when she is influenced by the Cloak of Dark Illusions upon her being unable to get it off her. While training with Ray, Lucy teaches him about non-violent resistance as Megaria takes advantage of Allie's condition.
40	"The San Campion Hexagon"	Frank Squillace	Robert N. Skir	September 27, 2013
Ray, Gabe, and Allie are in danger at sea while investigating The San Campion Hexagon during a fishing trip with Grandpa Okamoto, Mr. Wallace, and Mr. Underhill. Meanwhile, a duel ensues between The Choten (whose real name is revealed to be August) and Saguru at the time when the Choten Minions are stealing boats.
41	"Exchange Program"	Frank Squillace	Kevin Hopps	October 4, 2013
The kids and Duel Masters ask Isao Okamoto for help when people are replaced by holographic look-a-like Light Creatures. Sasha states that the creatures of the Light Civilization are acting under the orders of Eternal Haven to see if the humans are worthy of orderly behavior. Allie uses the Spell of Absolute Darkness to banish the Light Creatures which plunges the Temple into darkness.
42	"Bring Me the Head of Tatsurion the Unchained"	Frank Squillace	Mairghread Scott	October 12, 2013
When Headstrong Wanderer is kidnapped by Moorna under Lord Skycrusher's orders and Alakshmi's control, Tatsurion the Unchained goes on a rescue mission to save his mother, Headstrong Wanderer, and, with Ray's help, must deal with Moorna and Brutalus (who were responsible for the large bounty on him), the former of whom wanting revenge on him, the latter letting him, Ray, and his mother go.
43	"Forest for the Trees"	Frank Squillace	Thomas Pugsley	October 19, 2013
A dream warns Ray of a new danger in the Nature Realm and he and his friends cross the Veil to help. While there, Ray also searches for the Mystic who might be able to give him the healing spell he has been looking for when Homunculon starts to slowly take over Saguru's mind. Meanwhile, The Choten leads Master Brightmore, Heller, and Carny into using the Bladefish to help harvest the horns of the Rumbling Terrasaurs.
44	"Unmasked"	Frank Squillace	Josh Haber	November 2, 2013
Ray, Allie, Gabe and Master Isao accidentally locate the Choten's ship, but are unable to escape unnoticed. Meanwhile, Alakshmi attempts an unconventional method to free her "Sensei" from her mana-dampening armor following their escape from the Fire Civilization as Alakshmi plans to get revenge on The Choten. Even when Alakshmi gets the mana-dampening armor off her "Sensei," the identity of the "Sensei" is a surprise for both sides.
45	"Dueling Partners"	Frank Squillace	Todd Garfield	November 9, 2013
Alakshmi comes to the Duel Masters for help when the Choten has his minions are hunting her. Allie and Alakshmi are literally stuck with each other as they are forced to work together when Master Nigel is overseeing a drilling operation that is using a Rumbling Terrasaur drill bit. Ray, Master Jaha, and Master Nadia find that the Choten and Megaria are meeting with Queen Kalima at the time when the Darkness Civilization and the Light Civilization are now at war.
46	"Brainjacked"	Frank Squillace	Ned Edmund	November 16, 2013
At the time when Carny is back in school, a bullied kid named Kevin steals one of Carny's tech-gauntlets and inadvertently opens the Veil which lets the Skeeter Swarmers into the school that take over everyone's bodies except Ray and Allie's. Now they and their creatures are the only ones left to fight against this. Meanwhile, Queen Kalima starts to have her forces invade San Campion where the incidents with the Skeeter Swarmers gives Gregoria the opportunity to invade San Campion.
47	"Deluge"	Frank Squillace	Nick DuBois	November 23, 2013
Ray decides to invite Master Isao over for a family reunion just as Butterfly Effects begin to ravage San Campion. Ray ends up surprised when Saguru makes an unexpected visit.
48	"Fallout"	Frank Squillace	Greg Weisman	November 30, 2013
Ray, Gabe, Allie, and the Duel Masters look to prevent future attacks after the Water Civilization launches an unprecedented assault on the Fire and Nature Civilizations. The kids bring together 4 unlikely heroes (consisting of Gregoria, Lord Skycrusher, Piercing Seer, and Sasha) and all Creature "friends" in an attempt to protect the peace. Ray and Tatsurion the Unchained discover that the flood that came from inland was by an evolved Cyber Complex (which resembles an evolved version of Finbarr's Dreadnought) using water that is being harvested from San Campion's reservoir by Master Brightmore and the Choten Minions.
49	"Bargain"	Frank Squillace	David McDermott	December 7, 2013
The Choten agrees to hand over a certain antidote to Ray if he is willing to give him a magical spell from the Water Mystic called the Spell of Liquid Compulsion. Ray agrees to the deal in the hopes that the antidote will undo Ken Okamoto's evolutionary mutation before it consumes him. Even when Ray finds the Water Mystic, he ends up getting a cryptic test revolving around the spell.
50	"Clash of the Monarchs"	Frank Squillace	Johnny Hartmann	December 14, 2013
The Duel Masters plan on freeing King Tritonus from The Choten in order to end the ongoing conflict in the Creature Realm. In order to do so successfully, they must gather Infernus the Immolator, King Tritonus, Almighty Colossus, Eternal Haven, and Queen Kalima together in the Null Zone and hold a "summit" among them to stop the rising war. As the Choten plans to make another attempt to claim the Monarch's Artifacts, Ray must learn not to let the fire within him consume him following the Choten's trick that involved the Spell of Liquid Compulsion.
51	"Siege"	Frank Squillace	Marty Isenberg	December 21, 2013
With the Creature Monarchs out of commission, Ray enlists Alakshmi to help find The Choten so that he can save his father from his control. At the same time, The Choten leads Master Nigel, the Saguru/Humonculon hybrid, Tiera, and Megaria into attacking the Duel Masters Temple. The Choten's intended use for the missing tanker of Evolution Serum is discovered where it has been converted into an Evo-Serum Bomb.
52	"The Evolution Will Not Be Televised"	Frank Squillace	Andrew R. Robinson	December 28, 2013
Following the Evo-Serum Bomb detonating in the Null Zone, the Choten takes control of the recently-evolved creatures and leads them into an attack on San Campion. Ray ends up encountering the Light Mystic where he is given a choice that revolves around saving San Campion or his father since the Spell of Radiant Purification can only be cast once.

== Home media ==
Shout! Factory began releasing the series in December 2012. United Kingdom-based Clear Vision has rights for the first two seasons through Region 2, including most of Western Europe and the Middle East.

Region	DVD title	Episodes	Time length	Release date
1	Creatures Unleashed	1–5	110 minutes	December 4, 2012
1	Dragonstrike	6, 7, 23, 25, 26	110 minutes	April 30, 2013
1	Darkness of Heart	8, 9, 18, 19, 20	110 minutes	September 24, 2013
