= Little Wizard Tao =

- Also known as: 꼬마신선 타오
- Genre: Children, Adventure, Fantasy
- Written by: Kim Hyeong-ju, Ha Ji Hye
- Directed by: Lee Byeong-jik
- Countries of origin: South Korea; China
- Original language: Korean
- No. of seasons: 2
- No. of episodes: 52 (104 segments)

Production
- Producers: G.P. Jeong; Guo Chengda
- Running time: 26 minutes
- Production companies: G&G Entertainment; Motion Magic Digital Studios

Original release
- Network: KBS2 (Season 1); KBS1 (Season 2)
- Release: 13 July 2009 – 6 April 2013

Little Wizard Tao is a children's adventure fantasy animated television series co-produced by South Korean G&G Entertainment and Chinese animation studio Motion Magic Digital Studios. The series was originally aired on KBS2 and later distributed to markets in China, Hong Kong, Great Britain and France. Little Wizard Tao premiered on 13 July 2009 and concluded season 1 on 26 April 2010. The series focuses on Tao, a young boy with magical powers, as he attends school to become a wizard.

In 2013, it was also aired on KBS World with Little Wizard Tao Season 2 also airing in 2014.

== Episodes ==
=== Season 1 ===
No.	Title	Original release date
1	"My Name is Tao / Off to Wizard School"	13 July 2009
2	"Turtle Bus Trip / Hello, Wizard School"	20 July 2009
3	"Kiki's Clone Doll / Our First Class"	3 August 2009
4	"The New Student, Sheldon / Cleaning the Peach Field"	10 August 2009
5	"May Ann's Medicine Class / Who Will Be Class Captain?"	17 August 2009
6	"The Flying Cloud / The Cloud Race"	24 August 2009
7	"Cloud Tree and Rain / Professor Bao's Reading Homework"	31 August 2009
8	"A Magic Journey to Spain / A Magic Journey to the North Pole"	7 September 2009
9	"The Dormitory Ghost / The Legendary Ming Ming"	14 September 2009
10	"Baby Turtle Kun / Math is Hard"	21 September 2009
11	"The Treasure Hunt / Search for the Pengs"	28 September 2009
12	"Jasmin's Birthday / Tao's Golden Brush"	5 October 2009
13	"Magic Potion Experiment / The Legendary Secret Book"	12 October 2009
14	"Wizard School Ghost Story / The School Play"	19 October 2009
15	"Let's Go Camping / The Halloween Incident"	26 October 2009
16	"MingMing's Transformation / DungDung's Surprise Visit"	2 November 2009
17	"Tao in Wonderland / MingMing's New House"	9 November 2009
18	"Mumu's Fake Flu / Professor Bao's Test"	16 November 2009
19	"My Teeth Hurt / Polley and the Magic Hat"	23 November 2009
20	"Great Detective Tao / Pongus on a Diet"	30 November 2009
21	"Super Boy Kiki / Sleepyhead Tao"	7 December 2009
22	"Ping Pong Master Tao / Raising a Digimal"	14 December 2009
23	"Christmas and Santa Claus / Snowball Fight"	21 December 2009
24	"Ski Trip / Wash Up"	28 December 2009
25	"A Dinosaur Bone / A Journey into the Human Body"	4 January 2010
26	"Wizard School Broadcasting Station / Happy Cooking Class"	11 January 2010
27	TBA	18 January 2010
28	TBA	25 January 2010
29	TBA	1 February 2010
30	TBA	8 February 2010
31	TBA	22 February 2010
32	TBA	8 March 2010
33	TBA	15 March 2010
34	TBA	22 March 2010
35	TBA	28 March 2010
36	TBA	5 April 2010
37	TBA	12 April 2010
38	TBA	19 April 2010
39	TBA	26 April 2010

=== Season 2 ===
No.	Title	Original release date
1	TBA	5 January 2013
2	TBA	12 January 2013
3	TBA	19 January 2013
4	TBA	26 January 2013
5	TBA	2 February 2013
6	TBA	9 February 2013
7	TBA	16 February 2013
8	TBA	23 February 2013
9	TBA	9 March 2013
10	TBA	16 March 2013
11	TBA	23 March 2013
12	TBA	30 March 2013
13	TBA	6 April 2013

== Characters ==
- Tao is the seven-year-old adventure-loving protagonist of the series. He is the descendant of a powerful ancient wizard. Before receiving his invitation to attend the magic school, Tao lived with his grandfather. At school, Tao aims to become a great wizard. Tao has a magical paintbrush which turns everything he draws into real objects. Tao also has a soft spot for Jasmine.
- Jasmin (Xiaoming) is Tao's best friend. She is a good, kind-hearted student who is an advocate for truth and justice. Jasmin has healing powers and does not support violence. Jasmin also has a soft spot for Tao.
- Polley is a student whose power is shapeshifting into a fox. Polley typically only says three phrases: "good idea", "bad idea" and "no idea".
- Kiki is a nerdy student and science-enthusiast. He wears mechanical arms on his back.
- Sheldon (Xiuying) is a boastful, arrogant student and Tao's rival. He is to create and control fire.
- Mumu is a monkey who attends the magic school. He practices kung fu and wears a jumpsuit with the image of a banana on it.
- Pingus and Pongus Peng are penguin brothers who have power over ice. They both failed the past three years at school.

=== Minor characters ===
- Principal Lao is the principal of the school. When he was a student, he was the greatest wizard in the world.
- Professor Sonn-Sonn is a monkey who teaches P.E. class. His cousin is a great kung fu wizard.
- Professor Bao teaches chemistry and magic history.
- Professor May-Ann teaches musica, she is also the school nurse.
- Professor Griffe's subject is unknown, however, he has the power of invisibility.
- Grandma Owl is an owl who is the dorm mistress, known for her bad temper.
- Dodo is a fairy who looks after the school garden. She is intolerant of any mischief the students try to cause.
- Tao's grandfather looked after Tao before Tao moved to magic school. He enjoys gardening but misses Tao greatly.
- Dung Dung is Tao's childhood friend. He helps Tao's grandfather look after his garden. Sometimes he visits Tao at the magic school.
- Pedh Baba is a talking tree who guards a magical pond. The water from the pond is said to heal any wound.
- Turtle School Bus is a giant flying turtle. A seating area is attached on his back, he acts as the school bus.
