= Duel Masters =

Japanese media franchise

- Volume 1 cover

デュエル・マスターズ (Dyueru Masutāzu)
- Genre: Fantasy
- Manga
- Written by: Shigenobu Matsumoto
- Published by: Shogakukan
- Magazine: CoroCoro Comic
- Original run: April 1999 – present
- Volumes: 89
- Series titles
- Shobu Saga: Duel Masters; (1999–2005, 17 volumes); Duel Masters: Fighting Edge; (2005–2008, 12 volumes); Duel Masters: Star Cross; (2008–2011, 9 volumes); Katta Saga: Duel Masters Victory; (2011–2014, 10 volumes); Duel Masters Versus; (2014–2017, 12 volumes); Joe Saga: Duel Masters (New Series); (2017–2020, 11 volumes); Duel Masters King; (2020–2022, 8 volumes); Win Saga: Duel Masters Win; (2022–2026, 10 volumes); Duel Masters RX; (2026–present)
- Anime television series
- Directed by: Waruro Suzuki
- Produced by: Toshihiro Nakazawa; Makoto Jinguji
- Written by: Satoru Nishizono
- Music by: Jun'ichi Igarashi
- Studio: Studio Hibari; A.C.G.T.
- Licensed by: NA: Hasbro; Plastic Cow Productions (#1−26); Howling Cat Productions (2.0)
- Original network: TV Tokyo, Kids Station
- English network: AU: Network Ten; CA: YTV; IN: Jetix, Cartoon Network (Toonami), Pogo; SA: Disney Channel; UK: Toonami, Five; US: Cartoon Network (Toonami)
- Original run: October 21, 2002 – March 27, 2006
- Episodes: 78
- Seasons: 1. Duel Masters (26 episodes, 2002–2003); 2. Duel Masters Charge (52 episodes, 2004–2006)
Further information
Anime television series
Duel Masters (U.S. exclusive episodes)
Directed by	Kunihiro Mori
Produced by	Steven Drucker; Mickey Corcoran
Written by	Scott Page-Pagter
Studio	Studio Hibari; A.C.G.T.
Licensed by	NA: Hasbro; Elastic Media Corporation
English network	US: Cartoon Network
Original run	March 26, 2005 – January 28, 2006
Episodes	26
Anime film
Curse of the Death Phoenix
Directed by	Waruro Suzuki
Written by	Satoru Nishizono
Music by	Jun'ichi Igarashi
Studio	Studio Hibari
Released	March 12, 2005
Runtime	50 minutes
Anime television series
Shinseiki: Duel Masters Flash
Directed by	Waruro Suzuki
Written by	Koji Ueda
Music by	P-H-A-T
Studio	SynergySP; G&G Entertainment
Original network	TV Tokyo
Original run	April 10, 2006 – March 23, 2007
Episodes	24
Anime television series
Zero series
Directed by	Waruro Suzuki
Written by	Shinzō Fujita
Music by	P-H-A-T (#1–12); M-Bundle (#13–37)
Studio	SynergySP (#1−12); Nippon Animedia (#1–12); Shogakukan Music & Digital Entertainment (#13–37)
Original network	TV Tokyo, Kids Station
Original run	April 9, 2007 – March 29, 2008
Episodes	37
Seasons: 1. Zero Duel Masters (12 episodes, 2007); 2. Duel Masters Zero (25 episodes, 2007–2008)
Anime television series
Cross series
Directed by	Waruro Suzuki
Written by	Shinzō Fujita
Music by	Jun'ichi Igarashi
Studio	Shogakukan Music & Digital Entertainment
Original network	TV Tokyo, Kids Station
Original run	April 5, 2008 – March 26, 2011
Episodes	150
Seasons: 1. Duel Masters Cross (100 episodes, 2008–2010); 2. Duel Masters Cross Shock (50 episodes, 2010–2011)
Anime film
Lunatic God Saga
Directed by	Waruro Suzuki; Keita Hattori
Written by	Shinzō Fujita; Hideyuki Nishimori
Music by	Jun'ichi Igarashi
Studio	Shogakukan Music & Digital Entertainment
Released	September 19, 2009
Runtime	75 minutes
Anime film
Blazing Bonds XX
Directed by	Keita Hattori
Written by	Katsuro Hidaka
Studio	Shogakukan Music & Digital Entertainment
Released	August 21, 2010
Runtime	75 minutes
Anime television series
Victory series
Directed by	Waruro Suzuki (#1–103); Takao Kato (#104–154)
Written by	Shigenori Tanabe (#1–103); Kenichi Araki (#104–154)
Music by	Jun'ichi Igarashi
Studio	Shogakukan Music & Digital Entertainment
Original network	TV Tokyo
Original run	April 2, 2011 – March 26, 2014
Episodes	154
Seasons: 1. Duel Masters Victory (52 episodes, 2011–2012); 2. Duel Masters Victory V (51 episodes, 2012–2013); 3. Duel Masters Victory V3 (51 episodes, 2013–2014)
Anime television series
Versus series
Directed by	Shinobu Sasaki
Written by	Yoichi Kato
Music by	Jun'ichi Igarashi
Studio	Ascension
Original network	TV Tokyo
Original run	April 5, 2014 – March 26, 2017
Episodes	151
Seasons: 1. Duel Masters Versus (49 episodes, 2014–2015); 2. Duel Masters Versus Revolution (51 episodes, 2015–2016); 3. Duel Masters Versus Revolution Final (51 episodes, 2016–2017)
Anime television series
King series
Directed by	Shinobu Sasaki (#1–102); Hiroshi Ishiodori (#103–243); Yusuke Suzuki (244–260)
Written by	Yoichi Kato
Music by	Jun'ichi Igarashi
Studio	Ascension (#1–102); Brain's Base (#103–260)
Original network	TV Tokyo
Original run	April 2, 2017 – August 28, 2022
Episodes	260
Seasons: 1. Duel Masters (51 episodes, 2017–2018); 2. Duel Masters! (51 episodes, 2018–2019); 3. Duel Masters!! (51 episodes, 2019–2020); 4. Duel Masters King (47 episodes, 2020–2021); 5. Duel Masters King! (43 episodes, 2021–2022); 6. Duel Masters King MAX (17 episodes, 2022)
Anime television series
Win series
Directed by	Yusuke Suzuki
Written by	Yoichi Kato
Music by	Jun'ichi Igarashi
Studio	Brain's Base
Original network	TV Tokyo
Original run	September 4, 2022 – March 31, 2024
Episodes	78
Seasons: 1. Duel Masters Win (29 episodes, 2022–2023); 2. Duel Masters Win: Duel Wars (49 episodes, 2023–2024)
Manga
Duel Masters LOST
Written by	Shigenobu Matsumoto
Illustrated by	Yoh Kanebayashi
Published by	Shogakukan
Magazine	CoroCoro Comic
Original run	February 2024 – present
Volumes	4
Original net animation
LOST series
Directed by	Riki Fukushima
Written by	Yoichi Kato
Music by	Go Sakabe
Studio	J.C.Staff
Released	October 4, 2024 – present
Episodes	12
Seasons: 1. Crystal of Remembrance (4 episodes, 2024); 2. Reaper of Moonlight (4 episodes, 2024); 3. Sun of Oblivion (4 episodes, 2026); 4. Boy of Judgment (TBD)
- icon

Duel Masters (デュエル・マスターズ, Dyueru Masutāzu) is a multimedia franchise consisting of multiple manga and anime series, a trading card game, and several video games. It began as a manga adaptation of Magic: The Gathering before branching off in 2002.

== Plot ==
The story centers around the card game Duel Masters, which revolves around five civilizations consisting of Light, Water, Darkness, Fire and Nature. The original storyline follows Shobu Kirifuda, a young boy who likes to play Duel Masters. He and a few duelists are known to bring the monsters on the cards to life in their duels. Shobu engages in this card game so that he can be the best duelist like his father was.

== Characters ==
=== Main characters ===
Shobu Kirifuda (切札 勝舞, Kirifuda Shōbu)
Voiced by: Yumiko Kobayashi, Koki Uchiyama (adult) (Japanese); Joshua Seth (Season 1), Liam O'Brien (Season 1.5, 2) (English)
He aspires to become a great duelist like his father, Shori Kirifuda. Shobu keeps a positive attitude throughout the series, insisting on dueling for fun as opposed to simply winning. In the first season, Shobu takes on the challenge of defeating the temple champion, Hakuoh, who he feels has become corrupt with power. Throughout this portion of the series, Shobu must defeat Hakuoh's underlings while he struggles to understand the true spirit of dueling. All in all Shobu is brave, strong, and has the guts never to give up, just like his favorite creatures.
He uses a Fire Civilization deck which later becomes a Dragon Deck and even later evolves into a Dragon/Angel Command deck. After being defeated in a later season he loses most of his deck but is guided to his father's deck by the spirits of Bolmeteus Samurai Dragon and Bolbalzak "Sword Flash" Dragon. Soon after he combined elements from the 2 decks and created a Samurai Dragon/Angel Command deck (Fire, Light & Nature civilizations).
As of Duel Masters Cross his main cards are: Bolmeteus "Kensei" Dragon, Bolshack Yamato Dragon, Bolbalzak "Sword Flash" Dragon and Saint Bolshack, Spiritual Dragon. After losing Saint Bolshack, Valkiryas Musashi, Ultimate Battle Dragon and Sword Flash Galaxy, Super Champ became his trump cards as well. Later, his trump card becomes Bolshack NEX. He defeated Zakira with Bolpheaus Heaven in the manga.
Shobu also appeared in the anime movie "Rockman.EXE: Program Between Light and Darkness." In the Versus anime season, he appears as an adult.
Kirifuda literally means "trump card" in Japanese.
Hakuoh (白凰, Hakuō)
Voiced by: Junko Minagawa (Japanese); Joe Ochman (English)
Hakuoh is the archrival of Shobu Kirifuda. Hakuoh came from a prominent dueling family, and specialized in Light civilization from a young age. At that time, he was a reflection of Shobu, a young kid who loved the game above all else. This changed, however, when a mysterious duelist appeared and challenged Hakuoh to his first Kaijudo duel. Unaware of the dangers involved in a Kaijudo duel, Hakuoh became overconfident and was nearly killed as a result. Instead of being crushed by his opponent's attack, however, Hakuoh was pushed out of the way by his mother, who was fatally wounded. Since then, Hakuoh has become a cold-hearted villain and Shobu's main rival. Hakuoh no longer sees any fun in dueling and decides that one's value as a human being is determined by their ability to win and will rest at nothing to "be the best". As a result, Hakuoh becomes a dueling champion and the leader of the White Soldiers. Later in the series, he is challenged by Shobu Kirifuda (who Hakuoh recognizes as a reflection of his former self). As he is consumed with power, Hakuoh not only desires to defeat Shobu, but to crush him entirely and destroy his dreams of dueling. Hakuoh is finally defeated by Shobu and later he befriends him for showing him the true nature of dueling.
In Duel Masters Charge, Hakuoh is brainwashed into becoming Zakira's pawn, "White". In Duel Masters Zero, he becomes similar to his old self and appears to be working with Professor March (a mad scientist who lures duelists to a deserted island). In Duel Masters Cross, he tries to stop Zakira by challenging him to a duel, but was defeated. Afterwards, his "White" personality overtook him once again. However, after beating Mimi in a duel, he was able to return to his old self after seeing the damage he had caused.
Hakuoh uses a Light Civilization deck. In Season one, it is a mono-civilization deck focusing on a combination of Urth, Purifying Elemental, Szubs Kin Twighlight Guardian, and Dia Nork, Moonlight Guardian, with his intent on evolving Urth into Alcadeias, Lord of Spirits. This first deck relies heavily on blockers, which leaves him vulnerable to Shobu's "Scralet Skyterror." Later, in Duel Masters Cross, he is given a Light/Darkness Knight deck by Zakira. His main cards are Urth Purifying Elemental, Hanusa Radiance Elemental, Alcadies Lord of Spirits, Alphadios Lord of Spirits, King Alcadeias, Holy Gaia; Perfect Galaxy, Spirit of Immortality; and Nero Gryphis, Mystic Light Emperor.
Kyoshiro Kokujo (黒城 凶死郎, Kokujō Kyōshirō)
A self-proclaimed "evil genius" and another of Shobu's main rivals throughout the series. He uses a Darkness Civilization Deck, but later on in the subsequent series, it becomes a Darkness/Water deck. He has earned the nickname "Black Death", because of his relentless tactics and masterful use of Darkness civilization.
In later episodes, he helps Shobu to defeat P.L.O.O.P. (once again using a mono-Darkness deck). In Charge, he defeated Mimi in the Battle Arena tournament but lost to Yuu. He works on his own to defeat the Fua Duelists, who are responsible for destroying his former home. His ultimate cards are Dorballom, Lord of Demons, Ballom, Master of Death, Ballom Emperor, Lord of Demons, Ballom Monarch, the Dark Reaper King, XENOM, the Reaper King, Dark Strike, Reaper Beast, Bell Hell De Gaul, Footprint of the Reaper and most recently added, Black Ganveet, Legion of Darkness.

=== Kirifuda family ===
Shori Kirifuda (切札 勝利, Kirifuda Shōri)
Voiced by: Kenji Hamada (Japanese); Cam Clarke (Season 1), Milton Lawrence (Season 1.5) (English)
Shobu's father and a world famous duelist. Shori left home to continue his training, but he continued to miss his family every day. He reappeared in later episodes but disappeared again after the defeat of P.L.O.O.P. He makes an appearance in Duel Masters: Curse of the Death Phoenix to assist Shobu, only to disappear at its end. In Duel Masters Charge he was believed to have been killed in a duel against Zakira.
Shori is primarily seen in flashbacks, and whether he is believed to be alive or dead varies from season to season. However, he is seen to be alive at the end of the SX manga and all media following it. He plays with a deck similar to, but more advanced than Shobu's, with Bolberg Cross Dragon acting his trump card.
Mai Kirifuda (切札 舞, Kirifuda Mai)
Voiced by: Satsuki Yukino (Japanese); Cindy Robinson (Season 1), Wendee Lee (Season 2) (English)
Shobu's mother and Shori's wife. To help Shobu on different occasions, she has occasionally taken on the persona of a second "Dragon Mask" (the persona being first used by Knight) and challenged him.
Katta Kirifuda (切札 勝太, Kirifuda Katta)
Voiced by: Yumiko Kobayashi
Shobu's younger brother and the protagonist of the Versus/Victory seasons. He was in a coma as a young child during the events of Shobu's story. He initially has an aversion to Duel Masters but quickly learns to enjoy dueling against people. He has a strong obsession with curry bread.
Joe Kirifuda (切札 ジョー, Kirifuda Jō)
Voiced by: Yumiko Kobayashi
Katta's son and the protagonist of the King seasons. He lives with his mother Lulu. Joe has the power to bring his creature drawings to life with the help of his friend, the talking deck case Deckie. His favorite food is ramen.

=== Shobu's friends ===
Rekuta Kadoko (角古れく太, Kadoko Rekuta)
Voiced by: Yuka Imai (2002-2010), Emiri Katō (2017-present) (Japanese); Debi Derryberry (Season 1), Sterling R. (Season 1.5), Brianne Siddall (Season 2) (English)
Shobu's best friend and loyal sidekick. Even though he is an expert at the rules Rekuta is a terrible duelist, often going without a single win during a tournament. He's often seen with his portable laptop to keep track of important duels. As a running joke, he is often accidentally sent flying into the air.
He has almost every card ever released (since his father Maruo (丸雄, Maruo) owns a card shop) but cannot correctly use the cards. His card knowledge often helps Shobu during duels.
Mimi Tasogare (黄昏ミミ, Tasogare Mimi)
Voiced by: Saki Nakajima (Japanese); Janice Lee (Episodes #1-26), Colleen O'Shaughnessey (Episodes #27-65) (English)
Another of Shobu's friends. Mimi first appeared to be both ditzy, but was later revealed to be the second of the Four Temple Guardians at the Junior Duelist Center and an expert player. Mimi also has super-strength and excellent martial arts abilities which enable her to bring down any walls and other obstacles. Her personality sometimes switches to a "serious mode" while dueling. Near the end of the first season, Mimi reveals that Hakuoh was not always a heartless duelist and her personal connection to Hakuoh has developed into a slight crush throughout the series. She mostly uses Nature Civilization cards, but tends to use Shield Triggers from all 5 civilizations.
George Kamamoto (ジョージ釜本, Jōji Kamamoto) / Boy George
Voiced by: Norio Wakamoto (Japanese); Tim Diamond (Season 1), Terrence Stone (Season 1.5), Brian Beacock (Season 2) (English)
A baby in a pink bear suit who is always seen sucking a pacifier. He rides around in a motor baby carriage and uses a Water Civilization deck, he is a skillful duelist and has even defeated Mimi (a powerful duelist in her own right) fairly easily. In Charge, he uses a Darkness/Water deck and withdraws from the tournament after losing to Yuu.
Dr. Root (Ｄｒ．ルート, Dokutā Rūto)
Voiced by: Kan Tanaka (Japanese); Derek Stephen Prince (Season 1.5, 2) (English)
Dr. Root is a mad scientist who is George's boss and an expert duelist. Outside of that, he also a human-resembling robot named Mr. Perfect and a pilotable giant robot. His eccentric methods always have some hidden lesson to help Shobu and his friends. In Duel Masters Zero, he takes charge of training Shobu and his friends. He has a deck of Survivors in season 1, and in Charge, he has a Darkness/Water deck similar to George's deck.
Sayuki Manaka (真中紗雪, Manaka Sayuki)
Voiced by: Saeko Chiba (Japanese); Debi Derryberry (Season 1), Peggy O'Neal (Seasons 1.5, 2) (English)
Appearing only in the anime, Sayuki Manaka is another one of Shobu's friends and classmates. A kind girl with a usually soft-spoken disposition, she cares deeply for Shobu and is always ready to help him when he's down. In addition, she is always present to see Shobu's matches and constantly cheers him on. Sayuki is shown to participate in duels on occasion. In the English version, Sayuki has an attitude despite being soft-spoken, and is very critical.
Knight (ナイト, Naito)
Voiced by: Katsuyuki Konishi (Japanese); Milton Lawrence (Season 1-1.5), Kirk Thornton (Season 2) (English)
Knight is Shobu's mysterious and soft-spoken mentor. In the English dub, his inner monologue is a source of much of the show's mature and subtle humor. Despite being Shobu's mentor, he is usually unable to assist his student in times of need due to either Shobu's stubborn attitude or Knight being unable to show up at the scene. On one occasion, Dr. Root had Knight take on a "Dragon Mask" persona to duel Shobu in order for him to reclaim his tournament pass. Knight, who only appears in the early anime, is loosely adapted from the manga-only character NAC.
NAC (NAC, Nakku)
NAC is a manga-only character. This character is loosely based on Satoshi Nakamura (中村聡, Nakamura Satoshi), a Japanese card game player who became one of the top Magic: The Gathering players in Asia. He was involved in the making of "Duel Masters", assisting Dai Matsumoto (the manga author's nickname) as a technical advisor (the manga's plot is based around Magic: The Gathering). He has appeared in the manga both as NAC and as a more realistic cameo of himself known as "Nakamura-san". According to one of Dai Matsumoto's omake sections in the manga, NAC was also involved in the development of the Duel Masters card game.
Great Bucketsman (グレート・バケツマン, Gurēto Baketsuman) / Extreme Bucketman
Voiced by: Akiko Suzuki (Japanese); Steve Blum (English)
A short duelist who wears a bucket on his head. He first appears in the Battle Arena tournament in Charge. He lost to Yuu by surrendering, and later, under Zakira's mind control, duels against Shobu. His Deck is Fire and Nature, mostly involving Earth Dragons and Firebirds. His trump card is Soul Phoenix, Avatar of Unity. He gives the card to Shobu to use in the final duel against Yuu. In Duel Masters Cross, he plays a Snow Faerie and Initiate deck.
Master (導師, Doushi) (マスター Masutā) in the manga
Voiced by: Hidetoshi Nakamura
Very little is known about the leader of the "Temple" (an organization within the Junior Duelist's Center). Throughout the first season he appears in a long black, hooded robe with his face half concealed by his long blond hair. "The Master" appears as Hakuoh's teacher and dueling coach. Knight suggests that the Master has only taken an interest in Hakuoh because he plans to use the young duelist in obtaining his "revenge" against the creature world who defeated him in a duel causing him to never duel again. "Master" seems to be responsible for Hakuoh's brainwashing and even pushes Hakuoh to attack Shobu with Alcadeias after his defeat. Master disappears after Hakuoh's defeat in Season 1 and hasn't reappeared since.
Goblin (ゴブリン, Goburin) / Fritz the Goblin
Voiced by: Tomohisa Asou
A goblin who works at the Junior Duelist's Center. In the dub, he is often mistakenly called a squirrel. Anyone who wants to enroll in the Junior Duelist's Center has to answer his riddles.
Kintaro Nanba (難波 金太郎, Nanba Kintarō)
The former gatekeeper of the Junior Duelist Center and part of an organization known as the White Soldiers (白い騎士団, Shiroi Kishidan; lit. "White Knights"). He was discharged by Hakuoh after losing to Shobu (who he had quickly befriended). Kintaro returned in Charge, having regained Hakuoh's friendship. He lost to Great Bucketsman in the Battle Arena tournament.

==== Temple Guardians ====
The Four Temple Guardians (四天衆, Shi Tenshū) are the elite members of the White Soldiers that work under Hakuoh.

Mikuni (三国, Mikuni) / Johnny Coolburns
The first of the Temple Guardians. He uses a Fire deck, and during his duel with Shobu he purposely mimicked everything he did in order to throw him off. Mikuni managed to defeat Shobu, but Mimi managed to convince the Master to invite Shobu to try again in a duel against Mikuni. He is defeated by Shobu the second time around and thus he quickly befriends him. Due to his defeat at the hands of Shobu, Hakuoh ends up discharging Mikuni. He returns in Charge, having regained Hakouh's friendship.
Temple Guardian 2
See Mimi Tasogare
Gyuujirou Japan (邪藩 牛次郎, Japan Gyūjirō) / Benny Haha
Voiced by: Katsuya Shiga (Japanese); Kerrigan Mahan (Season 1), R. Martin Klein (Season 3) (English)
The third of the Four Temple Guardians. In the English dub, he is Mimi's "twin brother" where he had different plastic surgeries to look older where he claims that he is one minute older than Mimi. In the original version, he has no familial ties to other characters. Gyuujirou is often seen piloting a robot suit and first appears where he destroys Mimi's access card upon her defeat and wrecks her deck. He often cheats and relies on deceit in his duels. His constant defeat at the hands of the series' heroes has led him to hate both Shobu and Hakuoh.
Gyuujirou returns in Charge claiming to have turned over a new leaf, but this is quickly revealed to be an act. He forces Hakuoh into dueling before their match in a self-made Duel Masters Battle Arena by taking Aizen and Mikuni as hostage. Hakuoh manages to complete the "perfect duel" and defeat Gyuujirou despite his many attempts to cheat. Afterward, Gyuujirou detonates a bomb beneath the stadium and seriously injures Hakuoh so that he is unable to duel him the next morning. With Hakuoh eliminated, he ends up dueling Shobu again and loses. It is revealed that he is also working with Yuu. After he lost to Shobu, Gyuujirou was banished by Yuu and trapped in a room with George which they both escaped in the same episode. He uses a Water Civilization Deck and later a Wave Striker Deck during his tournament match with Shobu.
Makoto Aizen (愛善 真, Aizen Makoto)
The fourth of the Four Temple Guardians who also worked as the Temple's janitor. In the anime, he was defeated by Kyoshiro Kokujo before he could fight Shobu. He also lost to Hakuoh in Duel Masters Battle Arena Tournament. In the later season, he is shown to be using a Fire/Light Civilization deck. His trump card appears to be Warlord Aizonius.

=== P.L.O.O.P. ===
Short for Powerful Loyal Order of Princes, P.L.O.O.P. is an evil organization that plot to use monsters from the Civilizations of the Creature World to take over Earth. This organization appears only in the 26 episodes which were never broadcast in Japan. Their original names are unknown.

Prince Irving the Terrible
Shobu encountered him in the Light Civilization.
Prince Melvin the Conqueror
Shobu encountered him in the Water Civilization.
Princess Pollyana of Green Gables
She is a minor P.L.O.O.P. member who Shobu encountered in the Nature Civilization and works with Prince Wilbur the Great. She first appeared in Logville Village where she dueled against Shobu and lost. Princess Pollyana helped Prince Wilbur to capture Master Pangaea. She dueled against Flora (whose father was captured by Pollyana and Wilbur) and lost to her.
Prince Wilburg the Great
Shobu encountered him in the Nature Civilization.
Prince Maurice the Merciless
Shobu encountered him in the Darkness Civilization.
Prince Herbert the Ruthless
He is a minor PLOOP member who Shobu encountered at the gates of the Fire Civilization.
Prince Eugene the Mean
Shobu encountered him in the Fire Civilization. Eugene used to be a dueling champ in the good world and that he even beat Knight in the episode "Deck Me Baby One More Time." Knight and Eugene meet and Knight explains what happened. Eugene also says "I used to duel for trophies. Now I duel for money."

=== Black Soldiers ===
The Black Soldiers are a group of duelists that are the opposite form of Hakuoh's White Soldiers. Most of the Black Soldiers consists of duelists that were unable to defeat Hakuoh when wanting to become a member of the White Soldiers. They entered the Battle Arena Tournament to beat all of its players. After the defeat of most of the Black Soldier, most of the unnamed members left the group.

Kuroyanagi (黒柳) / Robby Rotten
Leader of the Black Soldiers. He wanted to be a member of Hakouh's White Soldiers, but was denied membership even when he had defeated Mikuni. He formed the Black Soldiers so that he can duel Hakuoh. Unfortunately for him, he was defeated by Shobu and was last seen being interrogated by Yuu about Shobu.
Akayanagi (赤柳) / Akakan
Member of the Black Soldiers and Robby Rotten's right-hand man. He is the strongest of the Black Soldiers. He was defeated by George.
Aoyanagi (青柳) / Multi-Card Monty
Member of the Black Soldiers. He likes to tell long stories and confuse his opponent before the duel while shuffling his deck. He was defeated by Mimi.
Ishiguro (石黒)
Member of the Black Soldiers. Ishiguro had previously wanted to meet Hakuoh when he was a student of the Temple. He defeated most of the Temple's students in a duel, but lost to Mikuni. He joined up with the Black Soldiers in order to duel Hakuoh and took part in the Battle Arena Tournament. Ishiguro was defeated in a duel by Hakuoh who acknowledges Ishiguro as a strong duelist.

=== Other antagonists ===
Yuu Fua (不亞 幽, Fua Yū) / Yumama
Voiced by: Chinami Nishimura
A mysterious girl often seen with her nose in a book or standing on the ceiling. She defeated George, Yuki and Kokujo right before they were supposed to duel, making her win by default. She was a childhood friend of Great Bucketsman. While she appears to be the cause of all the disruption in the tournament, she is really a pawn of her malicious older brother, Zakira. After she is released, she becomes an ally of Shobu, along with Bucketman. While brainwashed, her trump cards are Cruel Naga, Avatar of Fate and Super Necrodragon Abzo Dolba. In Duel Masters Cross her deck contains all 5 civilizations and is focused on creatures who have the following effect: "If this card is discarded during your opponent's turn, you may put this card into the Battle Zone instead of the Graveyard". Afterwards, she changes her deck into a Light, Water and Darkness civilization deck based on the Knight race using Brunhilde, Ghost Knight and Nero Gryphis, Mystic Light Emperor as her trump cards.

Zakira Fua (不亞 ザキラ, Fua Zakira)
Voiced by: Hiroki Yasumoto, Atsuko Tanaka (younger)
The main antagonist of the Duel Masters Charge and the Duel Master Cross series. An evil duelist, the nemesis of Shobu's father, and the one controlling Yuu, who is his younger sister, from the start. His goal is to obtain the "Duel Master's Proof" and use it for his evil means. He has multiple agents working under him, and operates from a large castle. His agents are ranked in terms of increasing power from A-Z (Z being himself). He uses a combination of Water, Darkness and Fire cards (most of his creatures are Zombie Dragons) with his deck being focused on sending cards to the graveyard (his and his opponent's), sometimes outright destroying them, and benefiting from it. Later in the series he changes his deck to a Light and Darkness Knight deck, his main trump cards being Romanov the 1st, Lord of the Demonic Eye, Death Romanov the 5th, General of the Demonic Eye, King Balcry, Demonic Eye Lord and Supernova Death Dragerion.

Professor March (プロフェッサー・マーチ, Purofessā Māchi)
A character introduced in Duel Masters Zero who is the most recent antagonist. He invited Shobu and his friends to a tournament on an uncharted island, but it was really a trap. After kidnapping Dr. Root, he forces Shobu, Mimi, and George to duel his associates.
Jura (ジュラ, Jura)
Originally appears in Zero Duel Masters as Shobu's newest rival. He is a subordinate of Professor March. He briefly appears in Duel Masters Cross.

== Media ==
=== Trading card game ===
The card game first originated in Japan in May 2002 and was marketed by Takara (later Takara Tomy following the merger). It was produced in English by Wizards of the Coast, who purchased the rights to the name Duel Masters from Reality Simulations, Inc., which ran a play-by-mail gladiator game called Duelmasters, now known as Duel II. The English-language printing of the TCG ran from DM-01 Base Set (May 5, 2004) until DM-12 Thrash of the Hybrid Megacreatures (November 2006). It was the twelfth and final expansion released by Wizards of the Coast for the English-language game before it was discontinued in 2006.

The spin-off product, Kaijudo, was announced by Wizards of the Coast in February 2012. A relaunch of the TCG product line with Wizards of the Coast working along with its parent company Hasbro. It was released on June 26, 2012, and was incompatible with previous Duel Masters cards. Wizards of the Coast discontinued Kaijudo in 2014.

In Japan, the card game is an ongoing commercial success. As of 2024, there are over 90 mainline sets, with new booster sets, starter decks, promotional cards, and more released alongside them. Notable innovations include Cross Gear and Orega Aura equip cards; the Hyperspatial Zone and Gacharange side decks; Castle and Field continuous effects; Forbidden and Zero unlockable cards; and other varieties of double-sided and unfoldable cards.

=== Manga ===
The Duel Masters manga series is written by Shigenobu Matsumoto, and published by Shogakukan in the CoroCoro Comic magazine. While none of manga series have been licensed in English, there was a North American-created comic book by Dreamwave Productions.

The original manga series ran from 1999 to 2005 and was compiled into 17 tankōbon volumes. It was followed by Duel Masters: Fighting Edge from 2005 to 2008 and Duel Masters Star Cross from 2008 to 2011, along with several side story tankōbon.

There have been numerous spinoff manga by different authors. These include gag manga, background lore stories, and card playing guides.

==== Main titles ====
Title	Serialization dates	Vol.	Protagonist
Duel Masters	April 1999 – February 2005	17	Shobu Kirifuda
Duel Masters Fighting Edge	March 2005 – May 2008	12	Shobu Kirifuda
Duel Masters Star Cross	June 2008 – February 2011	9	Shobu Kirifuda
Duel Masters Victory	March 2011 – February 2014	10	Katta Kirifuda
Duel Masters Versus	March 2014 – January 2017	12	Katta Kirifuda
Duel Masters: New Series	March 2017 – January 2020	11	Joe Kirifuda
Duel Masters King	February 2020 – July 2022	8	Joe Kirifuda
Duel Masters Win	August 2022 – February 2026	10	Win Kirifuda
Duel Masters RX	March 2026 – present		Win Kirifuda

==== Other titles ====
Title	Serialization dates	Vol.	Notes
Duel Masters Lost	February 2024 – present	4	Alternate sequel to Duel Masters Win. Written by Shigenobu Matsumoto and illustrated by Yoh Kanebayashi.

=== Anime ===
The first television series originally premiered in Japan on October 21, 2002, and ran until December 22, 2003. There are a total of six seasons with Shobu Kirifuda as the protagonist. Duel Masters was followed by Duel Masters Charge, which is mostly based on the manga; Zero Duel Masters and its sequel Duel Masters Zero, which are an alternate sequel to the first season and ignores the events of Charge; Duel Masters Cross and Duel Masters Cross Shock. From Duel Masters Zero until Duel Masters Victory V, the series was CGI-animated and broadcast in a 12-minute format instead of 24-minute format.

A spin-off series, Shinseiki: Duel Masters Flash aired from April 10, 2006, to March 23, 2007. The series follows Teru Yumemi, who must protect the ARC pendant from the antagonistic Nest organization.

Duel Masters Victory premiered on April 2, 2011, and introduced a new protagonist named Katta Kirifuda, the younger brother of Shobu. Victory was followed by Duel Masters Victory V, and Duel Masters Victory V3. The later series Duel Masters Versus, Duel Masters Versus Revolution, and Duel Masters Versus Revolution Final returned to 2D animation and featured Katta as a middle schooler.

The 2017 Duel Masters anime introduced Joe Kirifuda, the son of Katta, and focused on his adventures in the Creature World. It was followed by Duel Masters!, Duel Masters!!, Duel Masters King, Duel Masters King!, and Duel Masters King MAX. In April 2020, Duel Masters King was delayed due to the COVID-19 pandemic. The anime returned on May 31, 2020.

A new anime titled Duel Masters Win premiered on September 4, 2022 and introduced the protagonist Win Kirifuda. Unlike the previous Kirifuda protagonists who use the 切札 kanji, his name uses the 斬札 kanji, and therefore he isn't related to them. Within Win's world, the events of all previous Duel Masters series are fictional. The series is followed by Duel Masters Win: Duel Wars.

An original net animation titled Duel Masters Lost premiered on YouTube approximately six months after the conclusion of Duel Wars. The series, focusing on an amnesiac, high-school-age Win Kirifuda, is split into multiple short seasons subtitled Crystal of Remembrance (Tsuioku no Suishou), Reaper of the Moonlight (Gekka no Shinigami), Sun of Oblivion (Boukyaku no Taiyou), Boy of Judgment (Danzai no Shounen), and Duel of Lost Paradise (Shitsuraku no Duel).

A spin-off anime animated by Plott titled I don't wanna be a Dragon Girl! (ドラゴン娘になりたくないっ!, Doragon Musume ni Naritakunai) began streaming on YouTube in October 2023. The channel reached over 100,000 subscribers within its first three months.

==== Overview ====
No.	Title	Air dates	Episodes	Protagonist	Animation studio
1	Duel Masters	October 21, 2002 – May 5, 2003	26	Shobu Kirifuda	Studio Hibari & A.C.G.T.
1.5 & 2.0	Duel Masters 1.5 & 2.0 (not broadcast in Japan)	March 26, 2005 – June 17, 2006	39	Shobu Kirifuda	Studio Hibari & A.C.G.T.
2	Duel Masters Charge	April 19, 2004 – March 27, 2006	52	Shobu Kirifuda	Studio Hibari & A.C.G.T.
3	Shinseiki: Duel Masters Flash	April 10, 2006 – March 23, 2007	24	Teru Yumemi	SynergySP & G&G Entertainment
4	Zero Duel Masters	April 9, 2007 – September 28, 2007	12	Shobu Kirifuda	SynergySP & Nippon Animedia
5	Duel Masters Zero	October 6, 2007 – March 29, 2008	25	Shobu Kirifuda	Shogakukan Music & Digital Entertainment
6	Duel Masters Cross	April 5, 2008 – March 27, 2010	100	Shobu Kirifuda	Shogakukan Music & Digital Entertainment
7	Duel Masters Cross Shock	April 3, 2010 – March 26, 2011	50	Shobu Kirifuda	Shogakukan Music & Digital Entertainment
8	Duel Masters Victory	April 2, 2011 – March 31, 2012	52	Katta Kirifuda	Shogakukan Music & Digital Entertainment
9	Duel Masters Victory V	April 7, 2012 – March 30, 2013	51	Katta Kirifuda	Shogakukan Music & Digital Entertainment
10	Duel Masters Victory V3	April 6, 2013 – March 29, 2014	51	Katta Kirifuda	Shogakukan Music & Digital Entertainment
11	Duel Masters Versus	April 5, 2014 – March 28, 2015	49	Katta Kirifuda	Ascension
12	Duel Masters Versus Revolution	April 5, 2015 – March 27, 2016	51	Katta Kirifuda	Ascension
13	Duel Masters Versus Revolution Final	April 3, 2016 – March 26, 2017	51	Katta Kirifuda	Ascension
14	Duel Masters (2017)	April 2, 2017 – March 25, 2018	51	Joe Kirifuda	Ascension
15	Duel Masters!	April 1, 2018 – March 31, 2019	51	Joe Kirifuda	Ascension
16	Duel Masters!!	April 7, 2019 – March 29, 2020	51	Joe Kirifuda	Brain's Base
17	Duel Masters King	April 5, 2020 – March 28, 2021	47	Joe Kirifuda	Brain's Base
18	Duel Masters King!	April 4, 2021 – March 27, 2022	43	Joe Kirifuda	Brain's Base
19	Duel Masters King MAX	April 3, 2022 – August 28, 2022	17	Joe Kirifuda	Brain's Base
20	Duel Masters Win	September 4, 2022 – March 26, 2023	29	Win Kirifuda	Brain's Base
21	Duel Masters Win: Duel Wars	April 2, 2023 – March 31, 2024	49	Win Kirifuda	Brain's Base
22	Duel Masters Lost: Tsuioku no Suishō	October 4, 2024 - November 29, 2024	4	Win Kirifuda	J.C.Staff
23	Duel Masters Lost: Gekka no Shinigami	December 21, 2024 - February 28, 2025	4	Win Kirifuda	J.C.Staff
24	Duel Masters Lost: Boukyaku no Taiyou	February 6, 2026 - February 27, 2026	4	Win Kirifuda	J.C.Staff
25	Duel Masters Lost: Danzai no Shounen	October 9, 2026 - November 20, 2026	4	Win Kirifuda	J.C.Staff
26	Duel Masters Lost: Shitsuraku no Duel	TBA	TBA	Win Kirifuda	J.C.Staff

==== Episodes (Season 1) ====
No.	Title	Original airdate (Japan)	Original airdate (US)
1	"This is a Duel!" ("Playing with a Full Deck"); Transliteration: "Kore ga Dyueru da!" (Japanese: これがデュエルだ!)	October 21, 2002	March 13, 2004
2	"A Stealthy Shadow" ("It's Not Easy Being Green"); Transliteration: "Shinobi Yoru Kage" (Japanese: 忍びよる影)	October 28, 2002	March 20, 2004
3	"The Dark Challenger" ("Toru, Toru, Toru"); Transliteration: "Ankoku no Chōsen-sha" (Japanese: 暗黒の挑戦者)	November 4, 2002	March 27, 2004
4	"Aim for Victory!" ("Toru, Toru, Toru...Part II"); Transliteration: "Shōri wo Mezase!" (Japanese: 勝利を目指せ!)	November 11, 2002	April 3, 2004
5	"To the Battle Arena" ("I'll Be a Monkey's Brother"); Transliteration: "Batoru Arīna e" (Japanese: バトルアリーナへ)	November 18, 2002	April 10, 2004
6	"Hakuoh's Miraculous Duel" ("Wok on the Wildside"); Transliteration: "Hakuō, Kiseki no Dyueru" (Japanese: 白凰、奇跡のデュエル)	November 25, 2002	April 17, 2004
7	"Jamira's Trap" ("White Boys Can't Charm"); Transliteration: "Jamira no Wana" (Japanese: 蛇美羅の罠)	December 2, 2002	April 24, 2004
8	"Fierce Battle! Evolution Creature" ("Duels of Futures Past"); Transliteration: "Gekitō! Shinka Kurīchā" (Japanese: 激闘!進化クリーチャー)	December 9, 2002	May 1, 2004
9	"To the Temple" ("A Goblin Shall Lead Them"); Transliteration: "Shinden e" (Japanese: 神殿へ)	December 16, 2002	May 8, 2004
10	"A New Trump Card" ("Shobu Gets Decked"); Transliteration: "Arata Naru Kirifuda" (Japanese: 新たなる切り札)	December 30, 2002	May 15, 2004
11	"The Man Who Manipulates Mana" ("The Ballad of Kintaro"); Transliteration: "Mana wo Ayatsuru Otoko" (Japanese: マナをあやつる男)	January 6, 2003	May 22, 2004
12	"Their Name is The Holy Quartet!" ("The Ballad of Kintaro...Part 2"); Transliteration: "Sono Na wa Shitenshū!" (Japanese: その名は四天衆!)	January 13, 2003	May 29, 2004
13	"Speed VS Speed" ("Looney Mikuni"); Transliteration: "Sokkō Tai Sokkō" (Japanese: 速攻VS速攻)	January 20, 2003	June 5, 2004
14	"A Blazing Turnaround" ("Looney Mikuni...Part II"); Transliteration: "Honō no Dai Gyakuten" (Japanese: 炎の大逆転)	January 27, 2003	June 12, 2004
15	"Tasogare of the Holy Quartet" ("A Strange Twist of Fate"); Transliteration: "Tasogare no Shitenshū" (Japanese: 黄昏の四天衆)	February 3, 2003	June 19, 2004
16	"Mimi's Decision" ("Yes, Master"); Transliteration: "Mimi no Ketsui" (Japanese: ミミの決意)	February 10, 2003	June 26, 2004
17	"The Worst Duelist Ever" ("Oh Brother, Where Art Thou"); Transliteration: "Saitei no Dyuerisuto" (Japanese: 最低のデュエリスト)	February 17, 2003	July 3, 2004
18	"An Approaching Shadow" ("Cable Guy"); Transliteration: "Semari Kuru Kage" (Japanese: 迫り来る影)	February 24, 2003	July 10, 2004
19	"Laughing Reaper" ("The Sound of Dueling"); Transliteration: "Warau Shinigami" (Japanese: 笑う死神)	March 10, 2003	July 17, 2004
20	"Activate! True Duel" ("Episode V: Kokujo Strikes Back"); Transliteration: "Hatsudō! Shin no Dyueru" (Japanese: 発動!真のデュエル)	March 17, 2003	July 24, 2004
21	"Showdown!" ("The One Where Shobu Duels Hakuoh"); Transliteration: "Kessen!" (Japanese: 決戦!)	March 24, 2003	July 31, 2004
22	"Final Trump Card" ("Just Duel It"); Transliteration: "Saigo no Kirifuda" (Japanese: 最後の切り札)	April 7, 2003	August 7, 2004
23	"A New Challenger" ("The Crying Game"); Transliteration: "Arata Naru Chōsen-sha" (Japanese: 新たなる挑戦者)	April 14, 2003	August 14, 2004
24	"Duelist Killer" ("Do You Really Want to Hurt Me"); Transliteration: "Dyuerisuto Kirā" (Japanese: デュエリストキラー)	April 21, 2003	August 21, 2004
25	"Shobu Falls at Sunset" ("Something Wacky This Way Comes"); Transliteration: "Shōbu, Yūhi ni Chiru" (Japanese: 勝舞、夕日に散る)	April 28, 2003	August 28, 2004
26	"Revive, Shobu!" ("What's a Mana You?"); Transliteration: "Yomigaere, Shōbu!" (Japanese: よみがえれ、勝舞!)	May 5, 2003	September 4, 2004

==== English version ====
The English-language version of the series was produced by Hasbro Entertainment and Plastic Cow Productions. It made a truncated four-episode preview premiere on Cartoon Network's Toonami block on February 27, 2004. The series then made its official premiere on March 13, 2004, as part of the Saturday Video Entertainment System block, with fewer edits. When Toonami was moved to Saturdays, the block premiered the rest of the series. It was also aired in a 6:00 AM timeslot on early Weekday mornings, as part of Cartoon Network's Early Prime block, which was aimed at kids who were getting ready to go to school during this time from October 4 to December 31, 2004. It returned once again from June 20 to December 30, 2005.

A second batch of 26 episodes was produced by Hasbro Studios and Elastic Media Corporation and premiered on Cartoon Network on March 26, 2005. Despite being aired some months later, these episodes were considered part of the first season and featured an original storyline not adapted from the manga. The original animation studio and staff remained mostly the same as the first season. Although these episodes were planned to be broadcast in Japan after Duel Masters Charge, they were ultimately never released.

Duel Masters 2.0 was later produced by Hasbro and Howling Cat Studios. It was adapted from the first half of Duel Masters Charge, compressing 26 episodes into 13. The final three episodes were scheduled but never aired.

Foreign language dubs were broadcast internationally in at least 50 territories including France, Germany, Belgium, Denmark, Portugal, Spain, Italy, United Kingdom, Ireland, Scandinavia, Romania, Finland, Australia, New Zealand, South Africa, Indonesia, Thailand, Singapore, Malaysia, Hong Kong, and Korea. All dubs, except for the later Korean rebroadcast, were based on the English-language versions of Seasons 1, 1.5, and 2.0.

Episodes of the English version are currently available for streaming on The Roku Channel, Tubi TV and Amazon Prime. The anime currently reruns on Hasbro Legends.

===== International-exclusive episodes =====
No.	Title	Original airdate (US)
27	"Atta Boy, George"	March 26, 2005
28	"Break On Through to the Other Side"	April 2, 2005
29	"The Duel Goes Ever, Ever On"	April 9, 2005
30	"Enemy, Mine"	April 16, 2005
31	"Win, Lose, or Draw"	April 23, 2005
32	"Go Towards the Light"	April 30, 2005
33	"The Lights Are on But Nobody's Home"	May 7, 2005
34	"If Ever A Quiz There Was"	May 21, 2005
35	"Duel or Alive"	May 28, 2005
36	"Water You Waiting For?"	June 4, 2005
37	"Nature Calls, Part 1"	June 11, 2005
38	"Nature Calls, Part 2"	June 18, 2005
40	"Fear Itself"	August 12, 2005
41	"Tournament Is Fair Play"	September 24, 2005
42	"In Deep Duel-Duel"	October 8, 2005
43	"Desert Storm"	October 15, 2005
44	"Wonderfalls"	October 29, 2005
45	"Creatures Of The Night"	November 5, 2005
46	"Quest for Fire"	December 3, 2005
47	"Deck Me Baby, One More Time"	December 10, 2005
48	"One For The Mana, Duel For The Show"	December 17, 2005
49	"Do That Duel You Duel So Well"	January 7, 2006
50	"Boy Meets Duel"	January 14, 2006
51	"Man In The Mirror"	January 21, 2006
52	"Who Turned Out All The Lights"	January 28, 2006

===== 2.0 episodes =====
No.	Title	Original airdate (US)
1	"SHOwdown!"	February 4, 2006
2	"Babytalk"	February 11, 2006
3	"Fourscore"	February 18, 2006
4	"Frotime"	February 25, 2006
5	"Duelusional"	March 4, 2006
6	"Duel-ercise"	March 11, 2006
7	"Triple-Threat"	April 29, 2006
8	"Surprise!"	May 6, 2006
9	"Cheatery"	May 13, 2006
10	"Makeover"	May 20, 2006
11	"Switcharoo"	May 27, 2006
12	"Creeptastic"	June 10, 2006
13	"Finalitousness"	June 17, 2006

=== Video games ===
Takara, Atari, and Kids Station each produced their own Duel Masters video games. The games by Takara and Kids Station were only released in Japan while Atari's were only released in North America and Europe. Some of Takara's games were published by Atlus.

Game	Details
Duel Masters Original release date(s): JP: August 7, 2003	Release years by system: 2003—Game Boy Advance
Duel Masters Original release date(s): JP: August 7, 2003	Notes: Produced and published by Takara.; Developed by Amble.
Duel Masters: Nettō! Battle Arena Original release date(s): JP: December 18, 2003	Release years by system: 2003—GameCube
Duel Masters: Nettō! Battle Arena Original release date(s): JP: December 18, 2003	Notes: Produced and published by Takara.; Developed by A.I.; Famitsu gave the game a score of 28 out of 40.
Duel Masters 2: Invincible Advance Original release date(s): JP: March 18, 2004	Release years by system: 2004—Game Boy Advance
Duel Masters 2: Invincible Advance Original release date(s): JP: March 18, 2004	Notes: Produced by Takara and published by Atlus.; Developed by Amble.
Duel Masters: Sempai Legends Original release date(s): NA: June 1, 2004; EU: November 5, 2004	Release years by system: 2004—Game Boy Advance
Duel Masters: Sempai Legends Original release date(s): NA: June 1, 2004; EU: November 5, 2004	Notes: Produced and published by Atari.; Developed by Mistic Software.
Duel Masters 2: Kirifuda Shōbu Ver. Original release date(s): JP: July 22, 2004	Release years by system: 2004—Game Boy Advance
Duel Masters 2: Kirifuda Shōbu Ver. Original release date(s): JP: July 22, 2004	Notes: Produced by Takara and published by Atlus.; Developed by Amble.
Duel Masters Original release date(s): NA: November 2, 2004; EU: December 3, 2004	Release years by system: 2004—PlayStation 2
Duel Masters Original release date(s): NA: November 2, 2004; EU: December 3, 2004	Notes: Produced and published by Atari.; Developed by High Voltage Software.
Duel Masters: Kaijudo Showdown Original release date(s): NA: November 16, 2004; EU: March 31, 2005	Release years by system: 2004—Game Boy Advance
Duel Masters: Kaijudo Showdown Original release date(s): NA: November 16, 2004; EU: March 31, 2005	Notes: Produced and published by Atari.; Developed by Mistic Software.; Released in Europe as Duel Masters 2: Kaijudo Showdown.
Duel Masters 3 Original release date(s): JP: December 16, 2004	Release years by system: 2004—Game Boy Advance
Duel Masters 3 Original release date(s): JP: December 16, 2004	Notes: Produced by Takara and published by Atlus.; Developed by Amble.
Duel Masters: Birth of Super Dragon Original release date(s): JP: March 24, 2005	Release years by system: 2005—PlayStation 2
Duel Masters: Birth of Super Dragon Original release date(s): JP: March 24, 2005	Notes: Produced and published by Kids Station.
Duel Masters: Shadow of the Code Original release date(s): NA: October 18, 2005; EU: October 21, 2005	Release years by system: 2005—Game Boy Advance
Duel Masters: Shadow of the Code Original release date(s): NA: October 18, 2005; EU: October 21, 2005	Notes: Produced and published by Atari.; Developed by Mistic Software.
Duel Masters Play's Original release date(s): JP: December 18, 2019	Release years by system: 2019—iOS, Android, PC
Duel Masters Play's Original release date(s): JP: December 18, 2019	Notes: Published by Takara Tomy.; Developed by DeNA.; In-game collaborations include Rockman.EXE, The Seven Deadly Sins, Pop Team Epic, The Quintessential Quintuplets, KonoSuba, Nijisanji, Wixoss, Hololive, Atelier Ryza 2, and Oshi no Ko.
Duel Masters de Asobo Original release date(s): JP: August 5, 2021	Release years by system: 2021—Nintendo Switch, iOS, Android
Duel Masters de Asobo Original release date(s): JP: August 5, 2021	Notes: Produced and published by Takara Tomy.
Duel Masters de Asobo 2022 Original release date(s): JP: April 9, 2022	Release years by system: 2022—Nintendo Switch, iOS, Android
Duel Masters de Asobo 2022 Original release date(s): JP: April 9, 2022	Notes: Produced and published by Takara Tomy.

== Reception ==
As of 2014, the main manga series had sold approximately 4.5 million copies in Japan.

Along with The Magic of Chocolate, Duel Masters won the 66th Shogakukan Manga Award for Best Children's Manga in 2021.

== See also ==
- Kaijudo: Rise of the Duel Masters
