= Duel Masters (2004 video game) =

2004 video game

- Developer: High Voltage Software
- Publisher: Atari
- Series: Duel Masters
- Platform: PlayStation 2
- Release: NA: November 2, 2004; PAL: December 3, 2004
- Genre: Strategy
- Modes: Single-player, multiplayer

Duel Masters is a strategy video game released in late 2004 by Atari. It was made for the PlayStation 2 and is based on the Duel Masters trading card game franchise.

== Reception ==
Reception

Aggregate score
Aggregator	Score
Metacritic	66/100

Review scores
Publication	Score
GameSpot	6.5/10
GameSpy	3/5
IGN	7.4/10
Official U.S. PlayStation Magazine	3/5
X-Play	3/5

Duel Masters received "average" reviews according to the review aggregation website Metacritic.
