= Duel Masters: Sempai Legends =

2004 video game

- Developer: Mistic Software
- Publisher: Atari
- Series: Duel Masters
- Platform: Game Boy Advance
- Release: June 1, 2004
- Genre: Role-playing
- Modes: Single-player, multiplayer

Duel Masters: Sempai Legends is 2004 role-playing video game developed by Canadian studio Mistic Software and published by Atari.

== Gameplay ==
In Duel Masters: Sempai Legends, gameplay unfolds as a strategic card-based duel system rooted in Mana mechanics. Each match begins with players drawing from a 40-card deck, setting aside five cards as shields and five as their starting hand. Turns commence with a choice: sacrifice a card to the Mana zone—stripping it of abilities but enabling future summons. Summoning creatures requires tapping a number of Mana cards equal to the monster's cost, including at least one of the correct elemental alignment: nature, light, water, darkness, or fire. Players must balance deck composition carefully, as multicolored decks risk stalling without the right Mana type. Once summoned, creatures suffer from "summoning sickness," unable to attack immediately but still able to block. Cards vary in function—some are blockers, others deliver double strikes or boost attacks—making mastery of their side effects crucial as duels intensify. The game's story mode involves the protagonist, having lost a prized card, traveling between towns challenging locals to battles. Victories yield booster packs and reputation points, which unlock tougher opponents. Duels play out across three screens: a deck interface for managing Mana and summons, a battlefield where monsters face off, and an optional animation screen depicting the clash.

== Plot ==
Sempai Legends follows a junior duelist, celebrating his birthday...when one of his coveted cards is stolen in the night.

== Development ==
The game was announced in April 2003. It was developed by Mistic Software, a company founded in 1997.

== Reception ==
Reception

Review scores
Publication	Score
GameZone	7.5/10
GameSpy	3/5
IGN	8/10
Nintendo World Report	5/10

The game holds a rating of 69 of 100 on Metacritic.

GameSpy gave the game a 3 of 5 stating "Yup -- that's your "Yugi Sense" tingling. With Duel Masters: Sempai Legends, Atari gives gamers a new way to do their handheld card-based dueling. While it doesn't let you bang away with the 1000-plus monsters available in the Yu-Gi-Oh! games (at least not yet), it does offer somewhat deeper and more complex gameplay. Toss in the harrowing tale of a boy trying to find a stolen, priceless card, and you have a pretty solid package. There are a few rough edges, but if Atari plans on cranking out dueling games as fast as Konami does, those edges should be buffed smooth in no time"

Dave Clayman from IGN gave the game an 8 of 10 stating "Sempai Legends is clearly designed to compete with the super popular Yu-Gi-Oh! series. So how does it stack up? As I stated earlier the battle system is a matter of personal preference. However, gamers may be attracted to the more complicated duels and the individuality of the different Mana classes. At one time Magic: The Gathering was the most popular card game in the world and it will be interesting to see if its rule set can attract a new, younger audience for of Duel Masters"

Nintendo World Report gave the game an 5 of 10 praising the "Neat looking backgrounds" while criticizing the absurd storyline and noting the game is repetitive, boring, and tedious
