= Shogakukan-Shueisha Productions =

Japanese production company

Shogakukan-Shueisha Productions Co., Ltd.

- Headquarters in Chiyoda, Tokyo
- Trade name: ShoPro
- Native name: 株式会社小学館集英社プロダクション
- Romanized name: Kabushiki gaisha Shōgakukan Shūeisha Purodakushon
- Formerly: Shogakukan Productions Co., Ltd. (1967-2008)
- Type: Subsidiary
- Industry: Service industries
- Founded: June 26, 1967; 59 years ago
- Headquarters: Kanda-Jinbōchō, Chiyoda, Tokyo, Japan
- Area served: Worldwide
- Key people: Shinichiro Tsuzuki (president)
- Owner: Hitotsubashi Group
- Number of employees: 421 (2017)
- Parent: Shogakukan; Shueisha; Hakusensha
- Subsidiaries: Kodomo Living; Shogakukan Music & Digital Entertainment; Viz Media; Shogakukan Academy
- Website: www.shopro.co.jp
- Footnotes; Full member of The Association of Japanese Animations. Renamed to the current name on June 16, 2008.

Shogakukan-Shueisha Productions Co., Ltd. (Japanese: 株式会社小学館集英社プロダクション, Hepburn: Kabushiki gaisha Shōgakukan Shūeisha Purodakushon; ShoPro for short) is a Japanese production company, a subsidiary of the Japanese publishing group Hitotsubashi Group. Prior to 2008, it was known as Shogakukan Productions Co., Ltd. (株式会社小学館プロダクション, Kabushiki gaisha Shōgakukan Purodakushon).

== Notable filmography ==
- A Penguin's Troubles
- Black Torch
- Dandadan (co-produced by MBS)
- Departures
- Doraemon
- Frieren (co-produced by Toho)
- Kaiju No.8 (co-produced by Toho)
- Pokémon (co-produced by TV Tokyo)
- Pokémon: The First Movie
- Pokémon: The Movie 2000
- Pokémon 3: The Movie
- Celebi: Voice of the Forest
- Pokémon Heroes: Latios and Latias
- Psychic Squad
- Case Closed (co-produced by TMS Entertainment)
- Hamtaro
- Hayate the Combat Butler
- Inuyasha
- Irina: The Vampire Cosmonaut
- MegaMan NT Warrior
- Onipan!
- Ranma ½
- Shimoneta: A Boring World Where the Concept of Dirty Jokes Doesn't Exist
- Spy x Family (co-produced by Toho)
- Touch
- Urusei Yatsura
- Ushio & Tora
- Yaiba: Samurai Legend
- Zoids: Chaotic Century
- Zoids Zero
- Zoids: Fuzors
- Zoids Genesis
- Zom 100: Bucket List of the Dead
