= Mask Man (TV series) =

South Korean cartoon

- The cast of Mask Man
- Hangul: 마스크맨
- RR: Maseukeumaen
- MR: Masŭk'ŭmaen
- Genre: Action, Tournament, Comedy, Science fiction, Fantasy
- Directed by: Joon Kim
- Voices of: Sonjeong Ah; So Yeon; Gu Min Seon; Eun Young Seon; Hong Seong Heon
- Opening theme: Mask Man Opening Theme Song (Performed by: Wonja Lee)
- Ending theme: Hope of Tomorrow (내일의 희망) (Performed by: Boram Park)
- Country of origin: South Korea
- Original language: Korean
- No. of seasons: 1
- No. of episodes: 39

Production
- Production companies: G & G Movie Ltd., Barunson Co. Ltd.

Original release
- Network: KBS
- Release: July 3, 2005 – March 30, 2006

Mask Man (Korean: 마스크맨) is a South Korean animated cartoon series about intergalactic wrestling tournaments. It aired on KBS from July 7, 2005 to March 30, 2006, totaling 39 episodes.

== Plot ==
Mask Man travels around the universe and opens a tournament named MMF, which stands for Mask Man's Fight. They come down to the earth and find players to participate in the tournament. Darkman, who won the tournament four times in the past, can become the king of Planet Mask if he wins this year's tournament. Darkman changes the matching list and puts his men as the participants. Nobody knows that he is craving something more than winning at MMF.

Seri, whose father went to Amazon for martial art training, is staying at her father's gym. All of a sudden, Bikeman's spaceship comes down to the gym, smashing the roof. Seri recognizes that Bikeman is a clan of Mask Man, but he lost his memory and stays at Seri's house. She sees Bikeman's potential when he was battling with Arachaman, and trains Bikeman for MMF tournament. However, Darkman sees Bikeman enters into the final selection and sends more Mask Men to obstruct Bikeman.

== Episodes ==
1. The Difficult Battle (운명의 만남) (2005-07-07)
2. I'm Bike Man from Planet Mask (내 이름은 바이크맨) (2005-07-14)
3. Our Bigger Family (늘어가는 식구들) (2005-07-21))
4. Pink Baby and Lips Man (핑크베베와 입술맨) (2005-07-28)
5. Seri's Birthday (세리 생일 대소동) (2005-08-04)
6. Wake Up, Bike Man! (눈을 떠라 바이크맨) (2005-08-11)
7. The First Tryout at the MMF (도전! MMF) (2005-08-18)
8. Travel to the Amazon (아마존 대모험) (2005-08-25)
9. Coolness on Planet Earth (지구를 식혀라) (2005-09-01)
10. Super Iron-Powered Bikeman vs. Fartman (인기스타 바이크맨과 방귀맨) (2005-09-08)
11. The Prove to Fight (스포츠 정신이여 영원하라) (2005-09-15)
12. Seri's Determined to Win (세리 우승 대작전) (2005-09-22)
13. Bon Bon the Human Fighter (지구인 파이터 봉봉) (2005-09-29)
14. Natural Enemies (결전! 푸드패밀리 대 키친패밀리) (2005-10-06)
15. The Comedy Attack Killer (공포의 개그 피니시) (2005-10-13)
16. The Last Laugh of Red Kiss (최후의 불꽃 레드키스) (2005-10-20)
17. Queen Mama and the Princess Family (퀸마마와 공주패밀리) (2005-10-27)
18. Queen Mama and the Hot Spring (후끈후끈 온천 대소동) (2005-11-03)
19. The Halloween Special Match (할로윈 특별전 대소동) (2005-11-10)
20. The Return of the Ghost Cat (고스크캣의 역습) (2005-11-17)
21. Let's Enter the Game World (환상 게임세계 속으로) (2005-11-24)
22. Ninja X Man: The Desperate Fighter? (가혹한 운명) (2005-12-01)
23. The Real Martial Artist (진정한 무도가) (2005-12-08)
24. In Search of Forbidden Mummy (금단의 미라를 찾아라) (2005-12-15)
25. Bike Man's Decision (바이크맨의 선택) (2005-12-22)
26. Fight! Bike Man (파이팅 바이크맨) (2005-12-29)
27. Sauna Man - A New Hero (새 희망 사우나맨) (2006-01-05)
28. Red Kiss Returns (돌아온 레드키스) (2006-01-12)
29. The First Match of MMF 2 (가자! MMF2) (2006-01-19)
30. Aracha Man's Transformation (아라차맨의 변신) (2006-01-26)
31. Bike Man's Super Speed (질주본능 부활) (2006-02-02)
32. The Return of Ninja Brothers (돌아온 최강형제) (2006-02-09)
33. The Light and the Darkness (빛과 어둠) (2006-02-16)
34. Saving Dr. Kim (위기일발 김박사) (2006-02-23)
35. The Resurrection of Moon Man (달맨의 부활) (2006-03-02)
36. The Truth about Dark Vader (달쑤베이더의 정체) (2006-03-09)
37. The Return of Drill Man (돌아온 드릴맨) (2006-03-16)
38. Fight! Bike Robot (출동 바이크로봇) (2006-03-23)
39. A Brand New Hope (영원한 가족) (2006-03-30)

== Voice acting ==
- Sonjeong Ah - Bikeman
- So Yeon - Kickboxing Girl
- Gu Min Seon - Arachaman
- Eun Young Seon - Seri
- Hong Seong Heon - Joon
- Goe Mul - Heart Belle
- Ohin Seong - The King
- Gu Minseon - Pink Baby
- Gim Sohyeong - TV Man
- Ghoe Jeongho - Beatman
- Oin Seong- Red Kiss
- brunnoh mg

== Series ==
- Director: Joon Kim
- Scenario: Jogyu Won
- Character Design: Hajongyun Eun, Raa Hyoung, Gim Jiyeon, songyounggeon

== Animation ==
- Background Design: Hang Wang Taek
- Prop Design: Cheon Seung Woo
- Color Design: Jeong Yoo Mi, Lee, Min, Kim Hyung Soon
- Art Director: Song Gyu Hwan
- Animation Director: Yi Gi Seok
- Casting Director: Yu Suzuki, Yi Gi Seok
- Animator: Han Young Hun
- Joyeonchul: Yib Yeong Jik
- Layout/Drafting: Jang Gil Seon, Gim Juseok, Oh Jimyeong, Heub Su, Hwang Youngsik, Gim Hongguk, Sin Hyeongsik, Jeon Deukwon, Gan Gilguk, Gang Juhong, Yuse Hyeong, Gwon Yongsang, Jo Minsu
- Paint: Eun Jung Lee, Geo Lae, Jeong Chang Taek, Bakse Yun, Sing Yeong Hui, Oh Jin Hui, Jeon Do, Choe Mun Suk, Hanjin Hui, Johyeon Seon
- Art: Yi Bong Mi
- Background: Gu Jeong Ran, Nohyejin Seong-in Yeoseong, Yang Ming Yeong, Haneun Ju, Yu Seung Yeon, Kim, Nam, Gu Jang Mi, Mi, Art Max
- Production Desk: Bak Hyo Jong
- Production Processing: Choe Seong Jin

== Digital Production ==
- 3D Director: Hangwang Taek
- 3D Production: Bang Geum Young, I Seolmun Josa, Bak Jinhyo, Gang Seong Cheol, Jo Yiju
- Director of Photography: Jeong Juri
- Range: Gimeun Hui, Yu Hui Young, Park 0

== Post Production ==
- Editor: Nam Jong Hyeon
- Translation: Masao Fumiko, Imhyeon ju
- Editing Director: Gimjun Seok
- Production editing: Hong Jong Man
- CG: Sin Jeong Won
- Producer: Minyoung Mun, Sindong Jo, nahyeonchae
- Production Support: Culture and Tourism, Korea Culture and Content Agency
- Production: KBS, G & G Entertainment, Barunson

== Music ==
- Sound Design: GG Sound, Gim Hui Jip
- Music Director: Yi Hanna
- Subject lyricist / composer: Ju, Yi hanna
