= Quest (play-by-mail game) =

Play-by-mail fantasy game

- Game logo.
- Publishers: Adventures by Mail, KJC Games
- Years active: 1991 to present
- Genres: fantasy, play-by-mail
- Languages: English
- Players: Up to 1000
- Playing time: Unlimited
- Materials required: Instructions, order sheets, turn results, paper, pencil, computer
- Media type: Play-by-mail or email
- Website: http://www.kjcgames.com/quest/quest.htm

Quest (or Quest: World of Kharne, or Quest Gamemaster Edition, or Quest GME) is an open-end, fantasy, play-by-mail (PBM) role-playing game. Initially released in the United Kingdom in 1991, by Adventures by Mail, it later became available for play in the United States, Australia, and other countries in Europe. The game has a First and Second Age, initially comprising about twenty worlds of up to 1,000 parties controlled by players. After the year 2000, the worlds consolidated into four. The current publisher is KJC Games.

Gameplay follows the Dungeons & Dragons model. Players lead parties of 6–15 characters of varying races and professions while exploring parts of the game world, Kharne, to include wilderness and dungeons. As of 2022, KJC Games publishes the game with the current version as Quest, Gamemaster Edition (Quest GME). Another version, Quest Unlimited, allows rapid turn processing and game progress via email.

== Play-by-mail genre ==
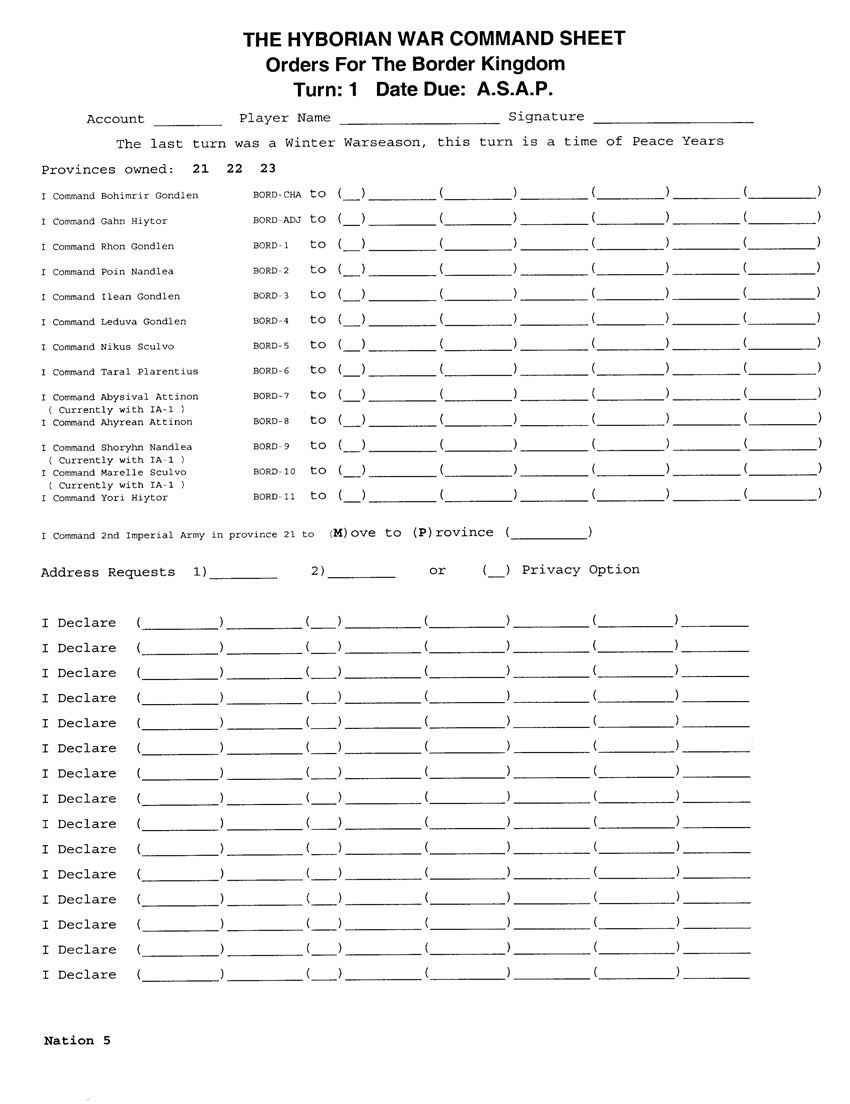
Example turn 1 order sheet for the Border Kingdom

Play-by-mail (PBM) games feature a number of differences from tabletop games. The typical PBM game involves many more players than an average tabletop game can support. (Note: For example, the PBM game It's a Crime can accommodate 110 players per game.) PBM game lengths are usually longer, depending on a number of factors. Turnaround time is how long a player has to prepare and submit "orders" (moves and changes to make in the game) and the company has to process them and send back turn results. The average turnaround time in the 1980s was two weeks, but some modern PBM games are play-by-email (PBEM) with shorter turnaround times of twice per week or faster. (Note: For example, the PBM game Covert Operations allows twice-per-week moves, daily moves, and private games where players can specify turn around times.) Open ended games allow players to strengthen their positions without end, with players continually entering and leaving the game. Examples include Heroic Fantasy and Monster Island. Conversely, closed end games typically have all players starting on equal terms, with rapid, intense, player vs. player gameplay that ends when a player or group achieves some victory condition or is unopposed. Examples include Hyborian War and It's a Crime. The complexity of PBM games can range from the relatively simple to the PBM game Empyrean Challenge, once described as "the most complex game system on Earth". (Note: Vern Holford, owner of Superior Simulations, developed Empyrean Challenge, a PBM game that reviewer Jim Townsend described in 1988 as "the most complex game system on Earth" with some turn results for large positions at 1,000 pages in length. According to Townsend, in those cases there was a significant investment in time to understand what happened on a turn as well as to fill out future turn orders. He said a player without a spreadsheet was "nearly doomed from the outset".)

Once a player has chosen a game and receives an initial game setup, gameplay begins. This generally involves players filling out order sheets for a game (see example image) and sending them to the gaming company. The company processes the turns and returns the results to the player, who completes a subsequent order sheet. Diplomacy is also frequently an important—sometimes indispensable—part of gameplay. The initial choice of a PBM game requires consideration as there is a wide array of possible roles to play, from pirates to space characters to "previously unknown creatures". Close identification with a role typically increases a player's game satisfaction.

=== PBM history ===
Some games have long been played by mail, such as chess and Go, and more recently Diplomacy. The professional PBM industry began in 1970 when Flying Buffalo Inc. launched its first multi-player PBM game, Nuclear Destruction, in the United States. Flying Buffalo dominated the industry from 1970 to 1975, with Schubel & Son and Superior Simulations introducing games later in the decade. By 1980, the PBM field was growing but still nascent; there were only two sizable commercial PBM companies, and a few small ones.

In the 1980s, the PBM industry grew rapidly. Many small PBM companies opened as there were few barriers to entry, although most of these companies failed. Three independent PBM gaming magazines also began in the early 1980s: Gaming Universal, Paper Mayhem, and the UK-based Flagship. The 1990s brought additional changes to the PBM world. In the early 1990s, email became an option to transmit turn orders and results. (Note: This section is taken from the Play-by-mail genre section of the Hyborian War Wikipedia article.) It was in this environment that Quest was published.

== History and development ==
Quest became available for play in 1991. It is an open-ended game. Patrick Rogers stated in 1993 that Quest was Europe's largest PBM game. Initially well-received in Europe, by 1994, Adventures by Mail had licensed the game in the United States. The game was also available for play in Australia, Finland, France, Germany, Italy, and Spain. As of 1994, there were two games underway in the U.S. version, each of which could comprise 1,000 parties. In the same year, Reviewer Richard L Smith identified KJC Games as the game's European publisher (based in England). Peter Lambeck also identified in 1994 that, in the U.S. version, there were two games underway, each with a capacity of 1,000 parties.

The game had a First and Second Age which together comprised almost 20 worlds for gameplay. The Second Age featured improved combat. After 2000, the game's twenty worlds consolidated into four.

By 2002, KJC Games had released a new version for play: Quest Game Master Edition or Quest GME. This version was also available for play by email. At the time, the game—previously computer-moderated—involved a human moderator. In 2002, the game continued to improve, with reviewer Dan Reed stating, "I cannot see a point in the future where boredom is likely ... An oak amongst PBM games is growing tall and wide, and will go yet further."

As of 2022, KJC Games was the only game publisher. The Second Age—published post-2000—remains, with plans for a Third Age never realized. KJC Games also generated a version called Quest Unlimited which allows unlimited turn orders via email, permitting rapid gameplay and progress.

== Gameplay ==
Quest's design follows the Dungeons & Dragons model. Players control parties of six players, which can expand to fifteen. Four races and four professions are available for each player character. (Note: Races available are dwarves, elves, half-bloods, and humans while professions are fighter, priest, mage, and thief.) Character attributes comprised: "Gold, weapons, skill, toughness, awareness, charisma, experience, % of load, energy level and health".

Initial parties require diversity in races and professions. Players can explore outdoor areas and dungeons, among other areas. There are various methods to find treasure and items, although some items have no use. In 1992, a group of players voted a vase as the game's "most useless item".

The game occurs on Kharne, a fictional world comprising an area of 200×200 squares. Population centers across the island provide the groups of adventurers with various options, including shopping, transport, training, and obtaining quests. Players can interact with non-player characters in and around population centers with a "talk" command. While adventuring, magic, religion, and gods will likely come into play, as well as creatures such as goblins, sewer demons, lizard men, and even dragons.

According to reviewer Peter Lambeck, the game's purpose is to "accumulate money and experience, build up your party, and have fun". Religion, magic, and party combat are part of gameplay, with multiple gods and spells available. Diplomacy is also key to successful gameplay.

Quest GME involves a greater degree of in-world history related to cities and gameplay.

== Reception ==
Quest won the 1993 Origins Award for Best New Play-by-Mail Game of 1993. Carol Mulholland, the editor of Flagship, recommended the game in 1994.

Reviewer Lambeck stated in a 1994 issue of Paper Mayhem magazine that the turn results were very detailed and "the turns are both entertaining and engrossing". In the Nov–Dec 1994 issue of Paper Mayhem magazine, Richard L. Smith outlined multiple improvements he recommended for the game while stating that he "continued to play despite the amount of frustration [he] had with the game".

In the Mar–Apr 1995 issue of Paper Mayhem, Quest tied for 44th place out of 65 in the PBM Game Ratings list with a 6.241 out of 9 possible points. On the same list, Quest received the 4th largest number of reader responses of the 65 games considered. (Note: Paper Mayhem used reader ratings through responses to tabulate game rankings. Of the 65 games rated, Quest received 84 total responses, surpassed only by Legends with 88 responses, Middle-Earth PBM with 106 responses, and Victory! with 140 responses.)

== See also ==
- Lands of Elvaria
- List of play-by-mail games

== Bibliography ==
- DuBois, Steven (January–February 1997). "Monster Island: A Review". Paper Mayhem. No. 82. p. 4.
- Flying Buffalo, Inc. "Covert Operations". Flying Buffalo Inc.
- Greenberg, Andrew (May–June 1993). "PBM Corner: A Beginning in Play-By-Mail; Is it Worth It?". White Wolf Magazine. No. 36. pp. 8–9.
- Lambeck, Peter (January–February 1994). "QUESTing on the Right Foot". Paper Mayhem. No. 64. pp. 15–16.
- Loomis, Rick (1985). "Rick Loomis on Play-By-Mail". Space Gamer: The Magazine of Adventure Gaming. July/August 1985 (75): 36.
- Loomis, Rick (December 2013). "Letter from Rick Loomis to the Play By Mail/Email/Web/Turn Based Games Community" (PDF). Suspense & Decision. No. 2. p. 38. Archived from the original (PDF) on July 4, 2021.
- Loth III, John Kevin (March–April 1986). "A PBM Primer". Paper Mayhem. No. 17. p. 42.
- McLain, Bob (August 1, 1993). "Play By Mail: The Infancy of Cyberspace". Pyramid. sjgames.com.
- Mouchet, Paul (February 2017). "PBM: Reducing the "Barrier to Entry"" (PDF). Suspense and Decision. No. 15. PlayByMail.net. pp. 10–12. Archived from the original (PDF) on October 30, 2020.
- Mulholland, Carol (February–March 2002). "Choosing a PBM Game" (PDF). Flagship. No. 94. p. 14.
- "Origins Award Winners (1993)". Academy of Adventure Gaming Arts & Design. Archived from the original on 2008-03-07.
- Paduch, Sally (June 27, 1993). "Email Brings Immediacy to Play-By-Mail Games". New York Times. p. RC21.
- Paper Mayhem editors (January–February 1993). "Front Matter". Paper Mayhem. No. 58. p. 1.
- "PBM Game Ratings". Paper Mayhem. No. 71. Mar–Apr 1995. pp. 59–60.
- Popolizio, Mike; LeBlanc, Liz; Popolizio, Marti (January–February 1990). "Revamping a Classic! The Redesign of BSE". Paper Mayhem. No. 40. pp. 8–10.
- Reed, Dan (February–March 2002). "Quest GME: Player's Verdict" (PDF). Flagship. No. 95. p. 35.
- Rogers, Patrick (September 1993). "Ship Ahoy!". Shadis. No. 9. The Alderac Group. pp. 43–44.
- Salman, Ref (January–February 1994). "Quest". Flagship. No. 47 (U.S. ed.). pp. 15–17.
- Smith, Richard L. (November–December 1994). "Quest: A Riddle Without Answers". Paper Mayhem. No. 69. pp. 12–16.
- Smith, Jonathan; Berthillier, Franz (February–March 2002). "Quest GME" (PDF). Flagship. No. 94. pp. 16–17.
- Townsend, Jim (March–April 1987). "A Real Look at Heroic Fantasy". Paper Mayhem. No. 23. p. 24.
- Townsend, Jim (1988). "The PBM Corner". White Wolf Magazine. No. 11. p. 20.
- Volker, Judy. "Kharne Encyclopedia: The World of Kharne". KJC Games.
