= Trolls Bottom =

Fantasy role-playing game

- Designers: Robert Fortune
- Publishers: Project Basilisk (UK), KJC Games (UK), Dynamic Games (AUS), Hexagon (Wiesbaden, DEU), R Rystrom (SWE)
- Years active: 1986 to unknown
- Genres: Role-playing, fantasy
- Languages: English
- Players: 70
- Playing time: Fixed
- Materials required: Instructions, order sheets, turn results, paper, pencil
- Media type: Play-by-mail

Trolls Bottom is a play-by-mail (PBM) role-playing wargame. It was published by Project Basilisk in the United Kingdom shortly after the company began in 1986 and spread to multiple countries globally over the following year. Up to 70 players per game roleplayed trolls on a volcanic island called Trolls Bottom struggling to win by being the last survivor. Players had various possible actions that affected four character traits. Besides other players, vulture companions and non-player characters populated the island. Orders were written in the style of It's a Crime with turn results written in a comedic style. The game received generally positive reviews in gaming magazines of the late 1980s and was listed No. 1 in Flagship's role-playing wargame category in its Autumn 1987 issue.

== Development ==
Trolls Bottom was a closed-ended, computer moderated PBM game published by Project Basilisk in the United Kingdom with licensing available in the United States. By 1988, KJC Games held the publishing rights in the UK and Europe. By 2002, Sweden's R. Rystrom was the only listed publisher in Flagship's game list.

Robert Fortune, owner of Project Basilisk, designed Trolls Bottom, after Piers Anthony's Xanth book series. It was his second PBM game, after the short-lived game The Land of the Basilisk, and published soon after the launch of his company in 1986. He wrote the program in Spectrum BASIC. According to reviewer Ian Lacey, "Robert then borrowed £500 to buy an Amstrad PCW8256, and converted the program to Mallard BASIC." After a year of growth and game development, Trolls Bottom gained widespread popularity, with Fortune licensing the game in Australia, New Zealand, and the United States.

== Gameplay ==
Each game has up to 70 players roleplaying trolls struggling for dominance on a volcanic island called Trolls Bottom. Players had 14 available actions that could affect Troll characteristics of Build, Morale, Sanity, and Strength. These actions were attack, dig, eat, hunt, look out, make noise, make weapon, move, rob and run, sneak and spy, tunnel, use, and two trading actions. Each player had a vulture as a companion which helped in scouting and trading actions. Non-player characters were also on the island, such as Balrogs, Moonworms, and Tree Guardians.

Orders were in the same format as It's a Crime. Reviewer John Woods stated in a 1989 issue of The Games Machine that "turn replies are written in a comical style, which will have you rolling about in laughter."

The player who survived to the end was the winner.

== Reception ==
Malcolm Hulme reviewed the game in the Summer 1987 issue of Flagship. He provided it a generally positive review, suggesting that the publishers provided slightly less information to players and that the game was suited as a lighthearted introductory game versus an advanced tactical wargame. He stated, "I heartily recommend that you give it a try." The editors of The Games Machine reviewed the game in 1988, stating that it "seems a fun and relatively simple game". In the Autumn 1987 issue of Flagship, the Editors ranked Trolls Bottom in first place with a 9.1 of 10 points, stating it was the "clear leader in this category".

== Reviews ==
- GM: The Independent Fantasy Roleplaying Magazine #1

== See also ==
- List of play-by-mail games

== Bibliography ==
- Editors (September 1988). "Post Haste: Trolls Bottom". The Games Machine. No. 10. p. 109.
- Hulme, Malcolm (Summer 1987). "Trolls Bottom". Flagship. No. 15. U.S. Edition. pp. 8–10.
- Editors (Autumn 1987). "Flagship Ratings: Spotlight on Fantasy Games". Flagship. No. 16. U.S. Edition. p. 19.
- Editors (June–July 2002). "Galactic View". Flagship. No. 97. p. 47.
- Lacey, Ian (April 1989). "PBM Mailbox: Excited by Crime; Trolls Bottom". Crash. No. 6.
- Woods, John (October 1989). "PBM Update: KJC Games". The Games Machine. No. 23. p. 63.
