= The Keys of Bled =

Play-by-mail science fiction game

- Other names: The Bledian Diary
- Publishers: Spellbinder Games (UK), The Australian Wizard (AUS)
- Years active: 1983 to 1996, 1999 to unknown
- Genres: science fiction
- Languages: English
- Systems: mixed (computer and human)
- Playing time: unlimited
- Materials required: Instructions, order sheets, turn results, paper, pencil
- Media type: Play-by-mail or email

The Keys of Bled (also The Bledian Diary) was a play-by-mail game that was published by Spellbinder Games. The game was initially published in the UK from 1983 to 1996. It was relaunched by Spellbinder Games by 1999 as The Bledian Diary.

== History and development ==
The Keys of Bled was a PBM game of moderate complexity. It launched in 1983. It was published from 1983 to 1996. The game was slower-paced and less combat-oriented than Crasimoff's World, which it shared similarities with. By 1999, its publisher in the UK, Spellbinder Games, had released an updated version called A Bledian Diary which was set on the same planet of Bled in an earlier period. The updated game was open-ended and mixed-moderated (computer and human).

== Gameplay ==
Players roleplayed the captain of a crashed starship leading 200 surviving colonists.

== Reception ==
In the January–February 1984 edition of Gaming Universal, Nicky Palmer stated that the game was "One of the least known PBM games and one of the best."

== See also ==
- List of play-by-mail games

== Bibliography ==
- Kemeny, Jim (July–August 1999). "A Beginner's Guide to A Bledian Diary". Flagship. No. 80. pp. 14–15.
- Palmer, Nicky (January–February 1984). "A PBM Game to Suit You: The Keys of Bled". Gaming Universal. No. 2. pp. 33–34.
- Palmer, Nicky (Spring 1985). "The Keys of Bled: The Desert and the Rose". Flagship. No. 6. p. 17.
- Kavanagh, Brendan (June 1988). "Special Start-up Offers: Keys of Bled". Crash. No. 2. pp. 33–34.
