= Rimworlds =

Play-by-mail space combat game

- Publishers: Palace Simulations Inc.
- Years active: 1985 to unknown
- Genres: science fiction, play-by-mail
- Languages: English
- Playing time: Fixed
- Materials required: Instructions, order sheets, turn results, paper, pencil
- Media type: Play-by-mail or email

Rimworlds is an open-ended, science fiction, play-by-mail (PBM) game.

== History and development ==
Rimworlds was an open-end computer moderated, play-by-mail game with a space-based setting. Rimworlds was published by Palace Simulations Inc. Jon Ogden was the designer. A reviewer in 1985 likened it to the game Beyond the Stellar Empire, combined with Universe II/III. The game had a player limit and was "sold out" with a wait list as of April 1986. Turns were run weekly.

== Gameplay ==
The purpose of the game was to develop a Rim Empire from a colony. Rimworld's setting, or The Rim, comprised four clusters, each with 1,560 sectors. Each of the game's six federations had a planet–a Ringworld–or a starbase. Players could create spaceships, starbases, colonies, and Starteams—or colony variants. In combat, ships had offensive tools such as phasers and single use photon torpedoes, as well as shields and other tools for defense. The publisher stated that the game was:

[A] simulation of the political, economic, and tactical ramifications of six space-faring civilizations that are being invaded by a seventh while dealing with organized crime, a militant religion, and a powerful labor union.

== Reception ==
Rimworlds won Best New PBM Game of 1984 from the Play By Mail Association. Terry Cale reviewed the game in a 1985 issue of Flagship, stating that it was "one heckuva game, a sure front-runner for best new PBM offering of 1985". Tim Sullivan reviewed the game in a 1988 issue of The D2 Report, juxtaposing a "heavy burden of complex rules" and comprehensive background with reports from some players that Rimworlds "is so realistic and satisfying, it is the only game they need to play".

== See also ==
- Cluster Lords
- List of play-by-mail games
