= Warboid World =

Science fiction play-by-mail game

- Cover of original rulebook, artwork by Tom Clark
- Designers: Jack Everitt, Robert Cook, Michael Popolizio, R. Steven Hasen
- Publishers: Adventures By Mail
- Years active: 1983 to unknown
- Genres: play-by-mail
- Languages: English
- Systems: computer moderated
- Playing time: Fixed
- Materials required: Instructions, order sheets, turn results, paper, pencil
- Media type: Play-by-mail or email

Warboid World is a play-by-mail game (PBM) originally published and moderated by Adventures by Mail in 1983 in which players build up armies of robots and send them to destroy other players' robot factories.

== History and development ==
The 24-page saddle-stapled softcover rulebook for Warboids was written by Jack Everitt, Robert Cook, Michael Popolizio, and R. Steven Hasen, with interior and cover art by Tom Clark. Robert Cook created the programming for the computer moderation. It was published by Adventures by Mail of Cohoes, New York. A licensed copy of the game was also run in the U.K. by Roger Trethewey. In 1984, the cost of play in the United States was $1 for the rulebook, $3.50 for set-up, and $3.50 for each turn. In the U.K. the cost of each turn was £1.75.

== Gameplay ==
Warboid World is a computer-moderated play-by-mail game for sixteen players set in the far future, after computers and robots have destroyed humanity. Each player takes on the role of a sentient computer that controls a Subterranean Industrial Complex (STIC) — a damaged underground complex that starts with two functioning factories that can produce more robots and powerplants, 30 damaged, non-functional factories, two internal powerplants — used to power functioning factories, repair damaged factories and power tunneling equipment — and five external powerplants that are used to power sensors, seize enemy robots, send orders to the player's robots, and power up new robots. Each player starts by using their turns to repair factories and build new robots while defending the factory from enemy robot attacks. There are designs for 25 different robots, each having a different combination of attack power, defense power, reserve power, and movement capability. In addition, some robots have special powers. A player can also use sensors on the surface to warn of approaching robots, which the player can then attempt to capture.

Once a player has built enough robots, they can move on to the main objective of the game: to send out robots to destroy other players' robots and factories, both of which net the attacking player Victory Points. If a player's STIC is destroyed, that player is eliminated from the game. At the end of a set number of turns, the player with the most Victory Points gained from destroying robots and factories is the winner.

One of the unique aspects of this game is that players remain anonymous. To ensure that players cannot figure out what game they are in or if their friends are in the same game, every player is told their STIC is buried under hex 5050, each player is given a different game number, and a number of games are started at the same time, all in order to prevent diplomacy and collusion between players.

== Reception ==
In Issue 27 of Abyss, David Macnamara noted "Boardgamers will love this game: assault, defense, hidden movement, intelligence reports, and infiltration. PBMers will like the turn around time (2 weeks), and the lack of diplomatic drain on the wallet." Macnamara thought the turn fees were too high, but concluded, "This is a pretty good way to spend your gaming dollars."

Brian Creese wrote a series of articles about Warboid World for Imagine, commenting on the play experiences of new Warboid player and friend Nick Shear. At the start of the game, Creese commented that "much of the 24-page rulebook is taken up with explaining [the special abilities of the various robots] and the various orders which go with them." But he noted that "Little understanding is required for the first move, however, since you start the game with few bids and little energy, which allows you few options." After some months of play by Shear, Creese felt that the lack of player interaction hindered the game: "This lack of communication, it was felt, cut out a great deal of the expected enjoyment found in computer games." Creese noted that in PBM games, "the interest needed [comes] from the actual scenario." Both Creese and Shear felt that "This lack of communication [...] cut out a great deal of the expected enjoyment found in computer games." Creese concluded, "This is a game whose appeal is much closer to chess or to a conventional wargame."

In the May 1984 edition of Dragon (Issue 85), Michael Gray noted that most PBM games thrive on inter-player communication, but "This game has a totally different 'feel' to it [...] You never know who your neighbors are." Gray likened the game to "a solitaire puzzle" or "like playing chess against a computer." He concluded by saying, "I still feel that something is missing."

In 1983, readers of The Space Gamer voted Adventures by Mail the top PBM publisher of the year, due to the popularity of Warboid World and Beyond the Stellar Empire.

== See also ==
- List of play-by-mail games
