= Capitol (play-by-mail game) =

Science fiction play-by-mail game

- Publishers: Adventures by Mail
- Years active: 1983 to unknown
- Genres: Role-playing, science fiction
- Languages: English
- Systems: computer-moderated
- Players: 12 teams of 4–8 players
- Playing time: unlimited
- Materials required: Instructions, order sheets, turn results, paper, pencil
- Media type: Play-by-mail

Capitol is a closed-end, computer-moderated play-by-mail game created and moderated by Adventures by Mail (ABM) beginning in 1983.

== Gameplay ==
Capitol involved twelve identically sized teams of 4–8 players in a competition against the other teams to conquer the galaxy. A group of players could join the game as a team; otherwise, individual players were assigned to one of the teams. (ABM tried to group individual players geographically so that they could contact each other to discuss strategy.)

The game map was a 98 x 98 grid (9,604 squares) across which hundreds of worlds were scattered. Players would use the resources of their home world to design and build ships, then fan out, seeking to conquer new worlds, which in turn would give them the resources to explore further. When a player discovered a world controlled by a player from a different faction, combat would result.

The object of the game was to be on the team that controlled the most worlds when the game ended, which could happen in one of two ways:

- When three of the twelve teams had no worlds left
- When the team with the most worlds had more than twice as many worlds as the second place team

Turns were moderated by a computer every 10 days. The cost to play was $2.50 for the rulebook and plastic map overlay, and $2.50 per turn for up to 60 orders. (Players could buy 30 more orders per turn for $1.)

== Reception ==
In Issue 30 of the American magazine Abyss (Summer 1984), John Bashaw commented, "Capitol is a science fiction space game in which players struggle against each other to control the most worlds and win. Simple and boring, right? Wrongo, Capitol has an uncommonly large number of innovations incorporated into the system." Basha concluded, "I find Capitol enjoyable and recommend it highly."

In the April 1985 edition of Dragon (Issue 96), Mike Gray liked the team aspect of the game, which differentiated it from other play-by-mail games of the time, and thought the team approach worked well. However he had a less-than-satisfactory experience in his first game, admitting that his inexperience led him to spend too much time developing his homeworld rather than exploring and discovering new worlds in order to harvest their resources. He concluded on an upbeat note, saying, "Capitol is a fun and very different experience. The rules are clear and easily understood, the overlays are a nice touch, and the teamwork aspect will prepare a novice for the individual diplomacy that must be developed in most other PBM games."

In the May-June 1985 edition of The Space Gamer (No. 74), Edmund Hack also had a less-than-optimal experience when, as an individual player, he was placed on a team with other players who were scattered across a wide geographic area. In the days before email, this made it difficult or expensive to coordinate turn-by-turn strategy. Hack's advice was to only sign up as a complete team, not as an individual: "I would recommend Capitol only for teams of players who ask to be set up together in the game... If you end up, like I did, on a 'pickup' team of players from different parts of the country who do not know each other, you are likely to be in for an uphill struggle. However, as a team game with your friends, Capitol can be challenging and exciting."

== See also ==
- List of play-by-mail games
