= Cluster Lords =

Play-by-mail role-playing game

- Publisher title
- Publishers: Palace Simulations
- Years active: 1992 to unknown
- Genres: science fiction, space opera, Role-playing
- Languages: English
- Playing time: fixed
- Materials required: Instructions, order sheets, turn results, paper, pencil
- Media type: Play-by-mail or email

Cluster Lords is a closed-end, play-by-mail science fiction, space opera. Palace Simulations published the game which was available for play in 1992.

== History and development ==
Cluster Lords was a closed-end PBM space opera published by Palace Simulations of Fairlawn, NJ. The first game began in August 1992. The game was mixed-moderated—primarily computer moderated, with some hand moderation for special actions. In the November–December 1993 issue of Flagship, the editors announced that the publisher was changing the name to Lords of Aphrodite with a game setting change to Venus.

== Gameplay ==
The game was set in the Rimworlds universe, but 25 million years earlier. The game map comprised 56,000 sectors for exploration. Players role-play mercenary spaceship captains. Players could choose various races and one of four alien species, or "factions": the Fleerte, Nardaka, Martaane, or Groniim, each with varying advantages related to ship size, resources, and other factors. Changing factions was possible every six months of play. Exploration, combat, and trade were all elements of gameplay.

== Reception ==
Bob Bost reviewed the game in the January 1993 issue of Flagship. He stated, "My overall impression is that this is an excellent game that will give plenty of enjoyment. Lone rangers with little time for diplomacy can operate better than in most closed end games, though it's always wise to have a few allies for information exchange. There are opportunities for the military, explorer, and trader that should give everyone a taste of what they are looking for." Nicky Palmer commented on the game in the same issue. He cautioned that the game required an investment in time for rewarding play and stating: "I've enjoyed it a good deal for its intriguing scenario, wide range of possible actions and delightful moderator."

== See also ==
- List of play-by-mail games

== Bibliography ==
- Bost, Bob (January 1993). "Cluster Lords: Come Armed!". Flagship. No. 41 (U.S. ed.). pp. 42–44.
- Bost, Bob (July 1993). "Cluster Lords' Advanced Book: The Race for Colonies Begins". Flagship. No. 44 (U.S. ed.). pp. 45–46.
- Editors (November–December 1993). "The Spokesmen Speak: Space Operas". Flagship. No. 46 (U.S. ed.). p. 9.
- Palmer, Nicky (January 1993). "Rumors from the Front: Cluster Lords". Flagship. No. 41 (U.S. ed.). p. 48.
- Proctor, Judith (May 1993). "Towards Computer Moderation". Flagship. No. 44 (U.S. ed.). pp. 23–24.
- Smith, Richard L. (November–December 1992). "Cluster Lords – A Space Opera". Paper Mayhem. No. 57 (U.S. ed.). p. 37.
