= Family Wars =

Play-by-mail game

- Publishers: Andon Games
- Genres: Crime, play-by-mail
- Languages: English
- Players: 18
- Playing time: Fixed
- Materials required: Instructions, order sheets, turn results, paper, pencil
- Media type: Play-by-mail

Family Wars is a closed-end, play-by-mail (PBM) game. It was published by Andon Games.

== Gameplay ==
Family Wars was a closed-end, computer moderated play-by-mail game. It was an organized crime game with players acting as the family leader. 18 players led crime families in a 14 × 20-block city comprising multiple precincts. The setting was the 1930s. Players used "effort points" to conduct various actions. Diplomacy was also a key part of gameplay. According to reviewer David Webber, "winning the game depend[ed] upon your skill at recruiting family members, influencing public officials, increasing your income, and eliminating your enemy facilities".

According to reviewer Patrick O. Dick, the three most important elements of gameplay were diplomacy, political influence, and warfare.

== Reception ==
In a 1988 issue of White Wolf, reviewer Stewart Wieck said that Family Wars was a "very enjoyable game", and recommended it to readers. Paper Mayhem editor in chief David Webber also reviewed the game in a 1988 issue, stating "I liked Family Wars." Webber noted that diplomacy was the best part of the game and emphasized its importance. Patrick O. Dick echoed this, stating that it was first "a game of diplomacy".

== See also ==
- It's a Crime (play-by-mail game)
- List of play-by-mail games

== Bibliography ==
- Dick, Patrick O. (November–December 1986). "PBM Capsule: Family Wars". Paper Mayhem. No. 21. p. 31.
- Webber, David (September–October 1988). "Family Wars". Paper Mayhem. No. 32. pp. 14–15.
- Wieck, Stewart (1998). "The PBM Reviews: Family Wars". White Wolf. No. 10. pp. 54–55.
