= Lands of Elvaria =

Play-by-mail fantasy wargame

- Other names: Frontier
- Publishers: Mark Pinder (UK)
- Years active: 1988 to 2002 or later
- Genres: fantasy, play-by-mail, roleplaying
- Languages: English
- Players: unlimited
- Materials required: Instructions, order sheets, turn results, paper, pencil
- Media type: Play-by-mail

Lands of Elvaria is a hand moderated, fantasy play-by-mail (PBM) game.

== History and development ==
Lands of Elvaria was a hand-moderated, fantasy, role-playing PBM game. It was available for play in 1998. The publisher was Mark Pinder of the United Kingdom. The game drew from Dungeons & Dragons. Reviewer Harvey Barker thought it similar to a "roleplaying version of Quest". In 1988, the publisher expanded the game with a version called Frontier, within the same world of Elvaria, adding another continent for gameplay.

== Gameplay ==
The game was set in the fantasy world of Elvaria. Players could role-play individual characters or parties. In 1996, players could choose from about fifty classes such as warrior, wizard, or thief. The gamemaster wrote humorous turn results. Reviewer Wayne stated that "with most of his NPC's being based around old 60's and 70's British TV comedy programs, the potential for enjoyment is vast".

== Reception ==
Harvey Barker reviewed the game in the January–February 1996 issue of Flagship. He provided it a mixed review with both positives and negatives, noting it might be more appealing to new, versus experienced, PBM gamers. Martin Dougherty reviewed the game in the same issue, stating that he "liked the game a lot". Wayne reviewed the game in a 1997 issue of Games Without Frontiers, stating that the game was not for everyone. He added that "It is a welcome bastion of light-heartedness in the ever-serious world of PBM."

== See also ==
- List of play-by-mail games

== Bibliography ==
- Barker, Harvey (January–February 1996). "Lands of Elvaria". Flagship. No. 59. pp. 12–13.
- Callaghan, Sarah (September–October 2001). "Lands of Elvaria". Flagship. No. 93. p. 22.
- Callaghan, Sarah (February–March 2002). "Lands of Elvaria: Sepheri's Diary Continues". Flagship. No. 95. p. 31.
- Dougherty, Martin (January–February 1996). "Lands of Elvira – Some Short Thoughts". Flagship. No. 59. p. 13.
- Editors (Summer 1996). "Very Late News". PBMZine. No. 5. p. 46.
- Pinder, Mark (February 1989). "The Mighty Pen". Flagship. No. 20. p. 55.
- Wayne (June 1997). "Talking Shop". Games Without Frontiers. No. 2. pp. 38–39.
