= Warlord (play-by-mail game) =

Play-by-mail post-apocalyptic wargame

- Publishers: KJC Games (UK)
- Years active: 1984 to 2006 (approximately)
- Genres: wargame, play-by-mail
- Languages: English
- Players: 100
- Setup time: Up to 6 months
- Playing time: 75 turns
- Materials required: Instructions, order sheets, turn results, paper, pencil
- Media type: Play-by-mail or email

Warlord is a closed-ended, computer moderated, play-by-mail (PBM) wargame.

== History and development ==
Warlord was a closed-ended play-by-mail (PBM) wargame of moderate complexity. It was published by KJC Games in the United Kingdom. (Note: This game is different than the fantasy PBM game Warlord published by Phoenix Publications in 1984.) It drew from another KJC game called Casus Belli.

== Gameplay ==
In Warlord, 100 players competed in a post-apocalyptic setting following nuclear war and nuclear winter. Gameplay occurred on a planet called Dexet where "a few million people survived by taking refuge in huge underground bunkers". Each player leads a city on the planet's surface. Survivors populated each city, led by "power-hungry military dictators". Players were supplied at the start with a world map and a map of their starting location, 8 × 9 sectors in size. Cities were placed randomly on the game map at 6–12 sectors apart.

Players could make up to 15 orders per turn. Actions included movement and combat. Technology was basic at the outset and advances during the game. For combat, players had access to "infantry, tanks, aircraft, and ships". Nuclear weapons were possible later in gameplay. Diplomacy was part of gameplay, through an in-game messaging system or outside of the game. Players achieved victory by gaining control of 20% of cities.

== Reception ==
The editors of GM Magazine reviewed the game in a 1990 issue, noting that it was "fast moving with plenty going on". They noted the importance of diplomacy and the simplicity of the game interface. They stated that it could be enjoyed by beginners and experienced gamers.

== See also ==
- List of play-by-mail games

== Bibliography ==
- Editors (May–June 1984). "Gameline News & Updates: Phoenix Publications". Paper Mayhem. No. 6. p. 18.
- McLain, Bob (January–February 1984). "Gamealog: Warlord". Gaming Universal. No. 2. p. 42.
- Wayne (May 1989). "PBM Update: Warlord". GM. Vol. 1, no. 9. p. 72.
- Editors (January 1990). "PBM Playtest: Warlord". GM. Vol. 2, no. 5. p. 18.
- Bagley, Adrian (May–June 1996). "Warlord: Holy War". Flagship. No. 61. pp. 4–6.
- Woods, John R (December 1989). "PBM Update". The Games Machine. No. 61. p. 62.
