= Adventures by Mail =

Play-by-mail company

- Company type: Play-by-mail
- Founded: 1981
- Fate: Not active
- Headquarters: Cohoes, New York
- Key people: Robert Cooke, Jack B. Everitt, Michael Popolizio
- Products: Beyond the Stellar Empire, It's a Crime, Monster Island

Adventures by Mail is a company that published play-by-mail (PBM) games. The company was founded in 1981. It published various PBM games including Beyond the Stellar Empire, It's a Crime, and Monster Island.

== History ==
The company—based in Cohoes, NY—began publishing PBM games in 1981. In 1982, the company hired another gamemaster, Michael Popolizio. In the January–February 1985 issue of Paper Mayhem magazine, the company announced a significant expansion of one of their main PBM games, Beyond the Stellar Empire (BSE) had occurred the prior December. They asserted in 1993 that they were the largest PBM company in the United States. At the time, their game offerings included BSE, It's a Crime, Monster Island, and Quest.

In 1983, readers of The Space Gamer voted Adventures by Mail the top PBM publisher of the year, due to the popularity of games such as Warboid World and Beyond the Stellar Empire.

== Published games ==
- Beyond the Stellar Empire
- Capitol
- Crasimoff's World
- Isle of Crowns
- It's a Crime
- Monster Island
- Smuggler's Run
- Quest: World of Kharne
- Warboid World

== See also ==
- List of play-by-mail games

== Bibliography ==
- "Adventures by Mail". The Journal of the PBM Gamer (7th ed.). Paper Mayhem. 1993. p. 9.
- "Adventures by Mail". Paper Mayhem. No. 10. January–February 1985. pp. 17–18.
- Cook, Robert (April 1982). "Beyond the Stellar Empire (Adventures By Mail)". The Space Gamer. No. 50. p. 38.
- "Galactic View" (PDF). Flagship. No. 99. October–November 2002. pp. 52, 50–51. Games listing is on page 52 with codes for game companies which are listed on pages 50–51.
- "PBM Update: Adventures by Mail". Fantasy Gamer. No. 2. Steve Jackson Games. October–November 1983. p. 44.
