= Crasimoff's World =

Play-by-mail game

Cover of rulebook for American version of Crasimoff's World

Crasimoff's World is a play-by-mail (PBM) game that was first developed by Kevin Cropper in 1980. It is regarded as the first fantasy role-playing PBM game.

== Publication history ==
In the 1970s, play by mail had become a popular method in the U.K. for games like chess and Diplomacy. In 1980, Kevin Cropper took his long-running Dungeons & Dragons campaign, "Crasimoff's World", and redesigned it as a postal game; he envisioned moderating his creation by replying to each player's actions with a hand-written response. He then advertised Crasimoff's World in White Dwarf and subsequently received so many replies that he eventually left his job in order to spend all his time running the campaign. Cropper founded KJC Games as the parent company of the game.

In her dissertation Playing with Power: The Authorial Consequence of Roleplaying Games, Michelle Nephew identifies Crasimoff's World as the first fantasy role-playing PBM game.

By 1984, Cropper had 450 regular players, beyond his ability to moderate on his own. Wanting to concentrate on managing a games store in Cleveleys, he hired two full-time gamemasters, Nigel Mitchell and Andy Smith. With continued growth another full-time gamemaster was employed in June 1985, Andy Hume. In addition to providing hand-written responses to players' turns, Mitchell, Smith and Hume also published a regular newsletter for players. For a time the game was popular enough that Cropper also hired a part-time staff member just to deal with new players' start-ups. From time to time, KJC Games also hosted "Crasimeets", conventions where players could meet face to face with gamemasters Mitchell, Smith and Hume for more traditional pencil-and-paper role-playing game sessions. It was at the first of these that the GMs got God nicknames (Mitchell - L'Denon, Smith - F'Nor, Hume - T'Gellen).

KJC Games licensed the U.S. rights to Jack Everitt of Adventures by Mail, who developed an American version of the game.

In 1987, KJC Games licensed Crasimoff's World to one of the gamemasters, Andy Smith, who created the company Crasiworld. A few years later, Crasiworld converted Crasimoff's World to a computer-moderated game, using the Quest PBM engine.

Bolstered by several other PBM games, Crasiworld kept Crasimoff's World in operation until 2004.

== Gameplay ==
In the original version of the game moderated by Kevin Cropper, players paid £2.50 for the rulebook, selected a cast of nine characters who were either priests, fighters or mages, and gave the group a name. Cropper would then place the new band of adventurers somewhere in his campaign world, and send the new player a letter that described their starting location, as well as campaign news, recent events in the new group's locality, and some rumours. The player would then respond with what they wanted their party to do, including which direction the party was travelling, trades or purchases, possible actions if encountered by hostiles, and any special instructions or requests. Cropper would then send further information and updates, and the player would respond with their next turn. Each turn cost £1.25.

If one player's party wandered into an area already inhabited by another player's party, Cropper would give each player the other's contact information so the players could confer directly to share information.

When Crasiworld changed moderation from human to computer, the number of starting party members was reduced from nine to six, but the new player could now choose from four professions as well as four races (humans, dwarves, elves and half-breeds) for each member of the party.

== Reception ==
In the January 1983 edition of White Dwarf (Issue #37), Trevor Graver was impressed, saying, "the effort the gamemaster puts into each turn never ceases to amaze me. Most players find themselves offered a different scenario each turn, or find that a new twist has happened to an existing adventure." He concluded with a recommendation to give it a try, commenting, "It's easy to play, and reflects the amount of effort you are prepared to put into your moves."

Brian Creese reviewed Crasimoff's World for Imagine magazine, and stated that "One nice feature of this game is that I have already made contact with another player after only a few moves."

In the September 1984 edition of Imagine (Issue 18), Brian Creese called Crasimoff's World "a highly worthy game", and mentioned the hand-written responses from moderators as an indicator of "the immense amount of effort put in by the GM." He also thought that "with its regular newsletter, Crasimoff's World is a friendly, efficient and relatively cheap game to play." Although Creese didn't find a PBM fantasy game as engaging as its face-to-face counterpart, he concluded, "If you wish to try a commercial pbm game with a distinctly D&D game-ish flavour, I would unhesitatingly recommend it."

Wayne Bootleg reviewed Crasimoff's World for Adventurer magazine and stated that "C.W. was the first P.B.M. I ever played and I have considerable sentimental ties with it. Nevertheless the standard it set many years ago has slipped and in its present form the game is sadly lacking in many departments."

== Awards ==
At the 1985 Origins Awards, Crasimoff's World was a finalist for "Best Play-By-Mail Game of 1984", losing to Starweb.

== Bibliography ==
- Editors. "Gods of Crasimoff: F'Nor, God of Darkness". 1st Class: The Play By Mail Games Magazine. No. 5. KJC Games. p. 22.
- Editors. "Gods of Crasimoff: T'Gellen, God of Fire". 1st Class: The Play By Mail Games Magazine. No. 6. KJC Games. p. 25.
- Kay, Roy (Winter 1983). "Worlds of Bled and Crasimoff". Flagship. No. 1. pp. 18–19.
- Priestland, John (Spring 1985). "Gods and Alliances in Crasimoff's World". Flagship. No. 6. pp. 9–10.
