= Monster Island (play-by-mail game) =

Fantasy role-playing game

- Designers: Jack Everitt
- Publishers: KJC Games
- Years active: 1989 to present
- Genres: Role-playing
- Languages: English
- Systems: Play-by-mail
- Players: Unlimited
- Skills: Critical thinking, diplomacy
- Website: www.kjcgames.com/mi/mi.htm

Monster Island is a play-by-mail (PBM) role-playing game. It was initially published by Adventures by Mail in Cohoes, New York. Jack Everitt, the game designer, came up with the idea for the game in 1985. The game, which was open-ended and computer moderated, was active by 1989, expanded rapidly in North America, and within a few years had spread to Great Britain and Germany. By 1997, it was one of the longest-running PBM games. The game is currently moderated by the UK-based KJC Games.

The game begins simply, then allows players detailed and elaborate options as it progressed. At the game's outset, players assumed the role of a monster which washed up on the shore of an island with no clothes and few survival tools. As players gained experience, they acquired more sophisticated tools and weapons, interacted with other players in various settings, and leveraged magic to continue exploration of the island in a quest for more experience and knowledge. Player interactions involve elaborate role playing seen in few other games of the period. Monster Island received generally positive reviews during its early years and won the Origins Award for Best New Play-By-Mail Game of 1990.

== Development ==
Monster Island was designed by Jack Everitt of Adventures by Mail, who came up with the idea in 1985. The game—which was open-ended and computer-moderated— was inspired from Robinson Crusoe and Gilligan's Island, and was a "tongue-in-cheek, open-ended excursion into the wilds of an unexplored island continent" with about 1700 players in North America. The publisher stated in 1990 that the game had the capacity for 15,000 players. In 1991, Everitt allowed players to send in ideas for creatures, items, and treasures. In the early 1990s, the game had become international, with "some 800 monsters … wandering around a separate game in England". In 1993, Herb Helzer stated in Paper Mayhem, a play-by-mail magazine, that the game rights had also been sold to a German company which was preparing it for play.

As of 1997, turns were processed every eight business days and could be submitted by paper mail, fax, or email. In 1992, the costs per turn were $4; by 1997, they had risen to $4.50 per turn, although initial setup remained free.

== Gameplay ==
Players control monsters of different races which begin the game by washing ashore on Monster Island "naked, hungry and clutching a driftwood club as a weapon". The game's main goals are to survive and to learn. Thus, players strike out inland, meeting other monsters, foraging for food and making tools and weapons to use, buy, and trade—rudimentary at first, but increasingly more sophisticated. As players gain experience and climb the hierarchy of needs, social activities, religion, and eventually even magic comes into play, allowing players to explore areas of the island hundreds of miles from where they start on an island continent larger than Australia which has more than 250,000 locations. As gameplay progresses, choices increase. Reviewer Steven DuBois noted in 1997 that the initial turn sheet order format was simple for novices, but by the end of the first year of play, the list of possible commands was significant, allowing complex interactions with other players (monsters) and the environment. Options were diverse, ranging from following a religion, exploring caves, creating "Zombie Juice", or joining a group.

Magic can play a significant role in the game. In 1992, it took the form of voodoo and spells. Acquiring voodoo skills was easier: it only required finding a "Far Inn" and spending some of the local money—"Oculars". Spells could only be acquired by following a god and additional steps which required time, effort, and luck, but, according to reviewer Debra Leon Guerrero, was "well worth it".

== Player interactions ==
Reviewer Steven DuBois stated in 1997 that the player interactions in Monster Island were the most "creative and fascinating" in his ten years of gaming. He noted that:

The vast scope of the game, its careful attention to detail, its use of humor and its imaginative descriptions of the monster races themselves contribute to an attitude of frenzied role-playing amongst participants. Players develop entire life histories for their monsters, as well as complex habits and attitudes.

Dubois also described the mythology that had emerged after seven years of Monster Island play:

The first religiously-motivated killing of player monsters, accomplished by the group known as the Disciples of the Light in 1990, is a landmark in history--as is the massacre of several monsters near the Odd Terapus Far Inn. Cults of personality have emerged around such characters as Gath Soulshredder … Carbunkle (the acknowledged leader of insult warfare) and Marlin Perkins (considered by many to be the island's most dangerous monster).

== Reception and legacy ==
Monster Island opened strongly. The game won the Origins Award for "Best New Play-by-Mail Game of 1990". Also in 1990, the game tied for fourth place as the "Best PBM Game of 1990" in Paper Mayhem as voted by readers. The game appeared on the PBM Game Ratings (as rated by readers) in Paper Mayhem's July/August 1990 issue at #25 of 68 games. Reviewer Debra Leon Guerrero stated in 1992 that she found Monster Island "worth the time and money", adding that Adventures by Mail provided excellent customer service. That same year, reviewer Phil Breault opined that the game was a "great starter game for a new player, or [a] good "quickie" for the experience[d] player who wants a relatively cheap, yet challenging game".

The game earned a fair reputation, generally settling in the lower-middle of the play-by-mail game field. For example, in reader ratings, it placed #46 of 84 games in the Sept/Oct 1992 issue of Paper Mayhem, and #46 of 77 games in its Jan/Feb 1995 issue. By 1997, it had fallen in the rankings to #42 of 54 games.

== See also ==
- List of play-by-mail games

== Bibliography ==
- "Adventures By Mail, Inc". The Journal of the PBM Gamer (4th ed.). Paper Mayhem. 1990. p. 9.
- Bosdal, Chris (September–October 1991). "What is Monster Island?". Paper Mayhem. No. 50. pp. 33–34.
- Breault, Phil (May–Jun 1992). "A Visit to Monster Island". Paper Mayhem. No. 54. p. 16.
- DuBois, Steven (Sep–Oct 1996). "Monster Island Monger Mash". Paper Mayhem. No. 80. pp. 38–39.
- DuBois, Steven (Jan–Feb 1997). "Monster Island: A Review". Paper Mayhem. No. 82. pp. 4–6.
- Guerrero, Debra Leon (September–October 1992). "The Long Haul on Monster Island: The Benefits of Continued Play". Paper Mayhem. No. 56. pp. 47–48.
- Helzer, Herb (Jan–Feb 1993). "Monster Island: Just One Destination for PBM Company". Paper Mayhem. No. 58. p. 12.
- Holmes, Andrew (Nov–Dec 1991). "Monster Island: The Persistence of Wishing". Paper Mayhem. No. 51. pp. 9–10.
- Holmes, Andrew (Sep–Oct 1992). "The Long Haul on Monster Island: The Benefits of Continued Play". Paper Mayhem. No. 56. p. 47.
- "Monster Island". KJC Games.
- "Origins Award Winners (1990)". Academy of Adventure Gaming Arts & Design. Archived from the original on 2007-12-14.
- Paper Mayhem (July–August 1990). "PBM Game Ratings: As of 5-26-90". Paper Mayhem. No. 43. p. 64.
- Paper Mayhem (Nov–Dec 1990). "Best PBM Game of 1990". Paper Mayhem. No. 45. p. 3.
- Paper Mayhem (September–October 1992). "PBM Game Ratings as of 07-20-92". Paper Mayhem. No. 56. pp. 52–53.
- Paper Mayhem (Jan–Feb 1995). "PBM Game Ratings: As of 11/18/94". Paper Mayhem. No. 70. pp. 44–45.
- Paper Mayhem (Jan–Feb 1997). "PBM Game Ratings: As of 1/15/97". Paper Mayhem. No. 82. p. 30.
- Smith, Richard L. (Jan–Feb 1997). "Monster Island: Land of Discovery". Paper Mayhem. No. 82. p. 7.
