= It's a Crime (play-by-mail game) =

Crime-based play-by-mail game

- Publishers: Adventures By Mail; KJC Games (current)
- Publication: 1985; 41 years ago
- Genres: Strategy game
- Players: 110
- Playing time: Varies
- Website: https://www.kjcgames.com/index.php

It's a Crime (also known as It's a Crime!) is a play-by-mail (PBM) game initially published by Adventures By Mail in September 1985. On publication, it was an introductory PBM game that took place in New York City in the 1990s where players attempted to raise a gang leader to the position of Godfather. During its initial decade, gameplay was technically simple at the outset, but added additional possible turn orders if players progressed to higher levels such as "mob boss". The coordination and diplomacy among players added additional complexity to the game. The game won the Origins Award in 1986 for the Best New Play-By-Mail Game of 1986 and a second Origins Award for Best Play-by-Mail Game of 1989.

In the 21st century, the game is run by the UK-based KJC Games which also offers a play-by-email option. The contemporary version is computer moderated and allows more than 100 players per game. It is largely similar to the original version, taking place in 21st century New York City, and requiring players to progress from small-time gang leader to Godfather to achieve victory.

== Development ==
It's a Crime was published in September 1985 by Adventures by Mail. It was designed, written, and programmed by Jack Everitt, Robert Cook, and Michael Popolizio.

When initially published, the game was an introductory-level PBM. At the outset, there were only twelve possible orders a player could issue. There were another "5 or 6 for gangs and 10 for mob bosses", which made the game technically simple. For each turn, some simple math was required, as players could issue orders that would allocate up to 100 percent of their gang and its resources. However, the diplomacy factor added significant complexity to the game. According to reviewer John F. Jainley in 1988, the game required great flexibility, and to do well, players needed to "be willing to change plans turn by turn. The game situation, players' strengths, and even the players' goals themselves, [were] constantly changing."

In 1988, the editors of The Games Machine asserted that It's a Crime was "the most popular PBM game in the world, with over 10,000 players". In the February 1989 issue of GM, the editors stated that it was the "most successful" game in Europe—possibly globally. KJC Games was also updating the game to a version called Gang vs. Gang, lessening the importance of mob bosses. By 1990, Adventures by Mail reported that over 50,000 players had played It's a Crime with the company claiming that it was "by far the most-played game in Play-By-Mail". in 1993, Adventures By Mail, Inc. reported "60,000 people" had played the game since publication.

== Gameplay ==
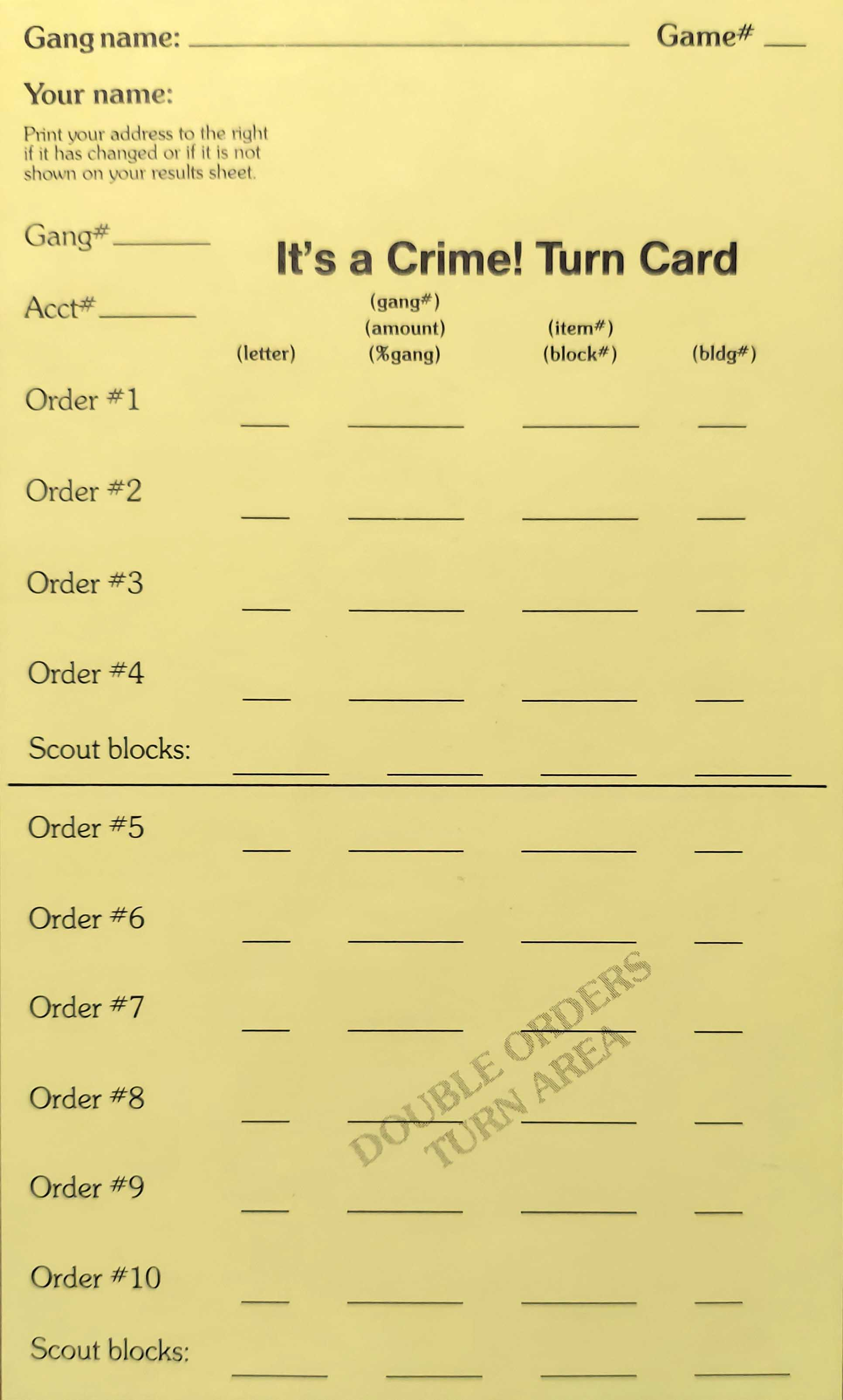
Example order sheet from the February 1986 edition published by Adventures by Mail, illustrating how a player would transmit orders to the gamemaster.

During the initial decade following publication, at the game's outset, players played a gang leader who led "a group of misguided youths"—one of 500 gangs in New York City. Players chose their own gang names, which included colorful varieties such as "Death Leopards", "Killer Penguins", "Molly Maguires", "Clash City Rockers", and "Zaphod Beeblebrox".

According to Hainley, success as a gang leader could lead to the next level—mob boss status. Hainley described his activities leading to mob boss status in a game of It's a Crime in Paper Mayhem, a magazine for play-by-mail gamers. For example, taking blocks of new turf was helpful in bringing in new " 'cruits." Having a large total gang size with associated arsenal was also consequential, composed of pros, punks, and 'cruits, all with different quality ratings. He also needed to monitor the morale of his gang members as low morale caused desertions. He could raise the morale of his gang by throwing parties for them. Raising money was done through various methods including selling drugs, as well as conducting firebombing, muggings, and robberies. And combinations of various orders enabled him to raise his notoriety level as a gang leader. In week 21, the most successful players were chosen as mob boss and sent separate paperwork.

At a certain point in games, gangs were chosen to form crime families, transitioning the game to the "boss level". At this level, gameplay changed and objectives were different, with gangs involved in tasks for their mob bosses or warring on behalf of them. Players in the role of mob bosses had to try to entice additional gangs into their ranks. One way to do this was to explain to them how their family would win because only the "Mob Boss" players received the additional boss rules in the mail.

The final goal was Godfather. To achieve that status, a mob boss needed to quickly garner "approximately 20 loyal gangs". Hainley's 1988 game example illustrated that activities in this stage of the game involved a significant amount of diplomacy to try to establish alliances, as well as "hits" on opposing crime families. Hainley's activities also showed that a certain amount of backstabbing occurred in this phase as well, during attempts at alliance-making. Once achieved, retaining the title of Godfather for three turns led to victory. This allowed a player to play the next game free which was "the equivalent of 60-70 turn credits". It also led to supporting gangs winning free credits.

The 21st century game is computer moderated and allows a play-by-email option. Gameplay is similar to the originally published version. Players lead one of 110 gangs in New York to build gang numbers, territory, wealth, and notoriety. At the outset, players have a one-block territory with a tiny gang of the same pro's, punks, and 'cruits" from the early years of the game. The player's stated task is "to become the meanest, biggest, toughest gang in the city". The purpose of the game is still to become Godfather. In the contemporary version, attaining this status leads to victory.

== Reception and legacy ==
Reviewer John F. Hainley stated in 1988 that It's a Crime was "a challenging and interesting game, but it may not be suited to everyone's taste's". He noted that although it appeared to be one of the least expensive PBM games available (at $1.50 per single turn in 1988), the phone coordination and diplomacy required meant that the "phone bills really went through the ceiling" during his experience in Game #12.

In Issue 10 of Gateways, Craig Stallone called it a "very entertaining game built on a imaginative concept that is followed through very well." Stallone concluded, "for those who like to have a little nasty fun, once in a while, for those who can take the pressure of being the toughest dude in town, write away for your rules right now! Even as you read this, your turf is being eyed by the Savage Chihuahuas ..."

Wayne Bootleg reviewed It's a Crime for Adventurer magazine and stated that "I am still playing It's a Crime as it's quick, easy to play and despite some very similar computer comments, entertaining, but I have given up all chance of winning or getting in the top 100 gangs. I have now settled back, content to pay my [cost] per turn and I leave the people who can afford it to become the winners."

Stewart Wieck reviewed It's a Crime in White Wolf #10 (1988), rating it a 7 out of 10 and stated that "Despite [some gripes], I do suggest you try It's a Crime. Afterall, the first two turns are free."

It's a Crime entered the play-by-mail field strongly, but settled to below-average player reviews in subsequent years. It won the Origins Award for Best Play-by-Mail Game of 1986. In 1987, it won the HG Wells Award and the CRASH Magazine Readers Award for Best PBM Game. In the November/December 1988 issue of Paper Mayhem, the game tied for #8 in the list of Best PBM Games of 1988. The game won a second Origins Award as well—for Best Play-by-Mail Game of 1989. In Paper Mayhem's July/August 1990 issue, in reader-generated ratings for playability, design, and product understanding, It's a Crime placed #61 out of 68 PBM games. In the September/October 1992 issue, it placed #80 of 84 games, and in the November/December 1994 issue it placed #71 of 72 games. The game did not appear on the Paper Mayhem ratings list in the January/February 1995 issue.

== Reviews ==
- Review in The Games Machine

== See also ==
- Family Wars. Play-by-mail game.
- List of play-by-mail games

== Bibliography ==
- Editors (May 1988). "Mr. Postman, Where's My Game? About KJC Games". The Games Machine. No. 6. p. 107.
- Hainly, John F. (July–August 1988). "From Street Punk to Godfather Part 1: The Making of A Mob Boss or "My Son, The Criminal"". Paper Mayhem. No. 31. pp. 6–10.
- Hainly, John F. (September–October 1988). "From Street Punk to Godfather Part 2: The Struggle for Godfather or "Making Offers You Can't Refuse"". Paper Mayhem. No. 32. pp. 7–10.
- Paper Mayhem editors (November–December 1988). "Best PBM Game of 1988". Paper Mayhem. No. 33. p. 2.
- KJC Games. "It's a Crime". KJC Games.
- Paper Mayhem editors (July–August 1990). "PBM Game Ratings: As of 5-26-90". Paper Mayhem. No. 43. p. 64.
- Paper Mayhem editors (September–October 1992). "PBM Game Ratings: As of 07-20-92". Paper Mayhem. No. 56. p. 52.
- Paper Mayhem editors (November–December 1994). "PBM Game Ratings: As of 9/12/94". Paper Mayhem. No. 69. pp. 44–45.
- Paper Mayhem editors (January–February 1995). "PBM Game Ratings: As of 11/18/94". Paper Mayhem. No. 70. pp. 44–45.
- Paul (January 1989). "It's a Crime: PBM Playtest". GM. Vol. 1, no. 5. p. 23.
- Quigley, Michael A. (July–August 1990). "My Kind of Town - It's a Crime!". American Gamer. No. 1. pp. 9–11.
- "The 1986 Origins Awards - Presented at Origins 1987". The Game Manufacturers Association. Archived from the original on December 16, 2012.
- "Origins Award Winners". Academy of Adventure Gaming Arts & Design. 1989. Archived from the original on November 5, 2007.
- Webster, Tom (May–June 1987). "It's a Crime: A Review Part I". Paper Mayhem. No. 24. p. 34.
- Webster, Tom (July–August 1987). "It's a Crime: A Review Part II". Paper Mayhem. No. 25. p. 37.
