= KJC Games =

British gaming company

- Type: Play-by-mail
- Founded: 1981
- Founder: Kevin Cropper
- Headquarters: Cheshire, United Kingdom
- Area served: Europe
- Products: PBM Games
- Website: http://www.kjcgames.com/index.php

KJC Games is a gaming company that publishes play-by-mail (PBM) games. Kevin Cropper started the company in 1981. It published PBM games such as Crasimoff's World, Earthwood, and It's a Crime.

== History ==
Kevin Cropper started KJC Games in 1981 in the United Kingdom. By 1988, it was the largest PBM company in Europe. The company's first game was the hand-moderated Crasimoff's World. The computer-moderated Earthwood and It's a Crime soon followed, the latter becoming the "most popular PBM game in the world" in 1988. The same year, KJC Games processed about 15,000 turns monthly on IBM 20MB clone computers and was exploring expansion opportunities.

In 2001, KJC Games published Space Troopers—a science fiction wargame—as a play-by-email (PBEM) game at no cost to players. KJC Games also began playtesting in 2001 for Phoenix: Beyond the Stellar Empire.

In 2005, KJC Games' Mica Goldstone included the company in the "big three" PBM companies with Harlequin Games and Madhouse.

== Published games ==
- Crasimoff's World
- Chairman
- Earthwood
- Extra Time
- It's a Crime
- Monster Island
- Beyond the Stellar Empire: Phoenix
- Quest
- Warlord

== See also ==
- List of play-by-mail games

== Bibliography ==
- Editors (May 1988). "Mr. Postman, Where's My Game? About KJC Games". The Games Machine. No. 6. p. 107.
- "KJC Games: Strategy Management Gaming". 2007.
- Editors (November–December 2001). "The Spokesmen Speak - News: Science Fiction Games". Flagship. No. 94. pp. 6–7.
- Mostellar, Charles (December 2013). "Reflecting on the Musings of PBM Personalities: The Changing Face of PBM meets the Mirror of Modern Day Reality". Suspense & Decision. No. 2. p. 51.
