= Beyond the Stellar Empire =

Fantasy role-playing game

- Original 1981 rulebook cover
- Publishers: Adventures by Mail, KJC Games
- Years active: 1982; 44 years ago
- Genres: Space fantasy
- Languages: English
- Systems: Computer moderated with human assistance
- Players: Unlimited
- Playing time: Open-ended
- Materials required: Instructions, order sheets, turn results, paper, pencil
- Media type: Play-by-mail, play-by-email, web-based

Beyond the Stellar Empire (or BSE) is a space opera play-by-email (PBM) game originally published by Adventures By Mail in 1983.

== Description ==
BSE was set in the future (2300 CE) in a remote area of the galaxy called the Capellan Periphery, which included 50 star systems that each had many planets, moons and space hazards. Each system was defined on a 30 x 30 grid map scaled at 40,000 square miles per square, with the location of each planet and moon shown, varying in size from 1x2 (a very small moon) to 36x52 (a very large planet). Space hazards such as asteroids and dust clouds were not shown — players marked these on the grid when they were encountered.

Each player controlled a single spaceship, which could range in size from a small yacht to a freighter or heavy cruiser. Each ship was divided into Command, Main and Engine sections, and the player could place items collected into the appropriate section.

Players could also join one of twelve interstellar companies, which varied from companies dealing in legitimate business such as Galactic Transport and Trade, Imperial Transport Service, and Solar Spices and Liquors, to companies such as Frontier Exploration and Trade (FET), which, according to the rules, traded "in illegal goods and drugs, making the FET a high-profit/high-risk oriented company." These corporations provided frameworks that enabled players to choose, pursue, and accomplish tasks, but also generated interesting competition dynamics between corporations as well as internal competition struggles that sometimes caused cleavages serious enough to cause banishments or voluntary departures. Players did not have to join a mega-corporation: other possible groups included "seven alien races, a religious sect, and a small piratical band know[n] as the Raiders of the Imperial Periphery (RIP)".

== Gameplay ==
After buying the rulebook, a player mailed in a completed turn form outlining all actions to be taken, along with payment for the turn. (In 1983, each turn cost $4.50. The player was also charged the same fee for each ground party and colony. A Gamemaster, aided by a computer, mailed back the results of the turn.

Each action taken by a player used a number of Time Units (TUs); a player could take up to 70 TUs worth of actions each turn. For example, jumping from one star system to another cost 20 TUs, while conducting transactions at a starport took 10 TUs.

Communication and diplomacy between players played an important part of the game; one player in 1987 received an average of 47 letters weekly from other players.

There were two variants of BSE:

- The Capellan Periphery was the initial variant and was open-ended in the sense that it had no victory conditions – players could continue to progress through work and expenditures, requesting and completing assignments, acquiring larger ships and colonies, etc. However Game Masters would step in and invoke a "ceiling" for players that became too powerful.
- The Draconian Variant was a truly open-ended game with no constraints.

== Publication history ==
BSE was an open-ended "space opera" PBM that was human moderated with computer assistance.. Adventures by Mail began playtesting in 1981, and the game opened for general use in 1982. By the end of 1982, Adventures By Mail had processed more than 20,000 turns. Reviewer Stephen Marte stated in 1987 that he had contact information for 150 other players but speculated that as many as 450 actually played the game.

In the January/February 1990 issue of Paper Mayhem, Mike Popolizio, Liz Leblanc, and Marti Popolizio described a redesign that included faster turnaround times for turns, additional options for diplomacy, increased ability to implement player suggestions, introduction of black-markets, and other changes.

The original game as run by Adventures by Mail in the United States was discontinued in the late 1990s. In the United Kingdom, a separate PBM game of Beyond the Stellar Empire ran until 2002 when the entire game was upgraded to a 21st-century version, Phoenix: Beyond the Stellar Empire (see KJC Games below). While still a PBM game, Phoenix enables players to input orders via web browser while receiving email turn results.

== Reception ==
In Issue 27 of Abyss, David Macnamara noted "The big selling point of this game is detail," and pointed out "Turn around time is phenomenal (8 days)". However, Macnamara had issue with the cost of turns, writing, "Considering what you get for a normal turn, [$4.50 per turn plus additional fees for ground parties and colonies] is pretty steep." Despite this, Macnamara concluded that the game was "pretty good."

In Issue 51 of Games, Matthew J. Costello wrote "One of the best [PBMs] is Beyond the Stellar Empire. In this intergalactic saga, players pursue space exploration, combat, or a cosmic version of Monopoly." Costello, who, at the time, played over a dozen PBMs, called BSE his favorite.

In a reader survey of PBMs taken by Space Gamer, BSE was the most popular game.

Wayne J. Alexander lamented that the Capellan Periphery variant was not truly open-ended in that the Game Masters (GMs) eventually would impose an artificial constraint on play that he called "The Wall". According to Alexander, "The Capellan Periphery has a lot of sizzle, but the steak is just dog meat." On the other hand, Alexander described The Draconian Variant as starting the players on the "ground floor" of a truly open-ended game. Alexander described this as "very little sizzle at this point, but the steak is filet mignon in potential".

Stephen Marte observed that Beyond the Stellar Empire was in some ways "the "ultimate PBM game".

BSE was the only PBM game selected by Games Magazine in its list of top 100 games of 1983. The editors noted, "Its scope is immense, and there's a high degree of player interaction ... The gamemasters who run your turn through the computer are very helpful to beginning players." BSE was selected for the "Games Top 100" the following year as well, with the editors noting, "A correspondence game with a wealth of detail and player interaction, Beyond the Stellar Empire is easy to play yet offers enough activity to be a full-time hobby."

In a reader survey taken by Paper Mayhem to determine "Best PBM Game of the Year", BSE placed #5 in 1987 (tied with Beyond the Quadra Zone) , and was #11 in 1988 (tied with Rimworlds.) In subsequent years however, the game was not rated highly.

== Awards ==
At the 1989 Origins Awards, BSE won for Best New Play-By-Mail Game of 1989.

== See also ==
- List of play-by-mail games

== Bibliography ==
- "Adventures By Mail, Inc". The Journal of the PBM Gamer (4th ed.). Paper Mayhem. 1990. p. 9.
- Alexander, Rob (January 2004). "Phoenix: A Major Advance" (PDF). Flagship. No. 105. pp. 10–11.. Magazine date: December—January 2003/2004.
- Alexander, Wayne J. (September–October 1992). "Beyond the Stellar Empire: Capellan Periphery versus Draconian Variant; The Poison and the Antidote?". Paper Mayhem. No. 56. p. 31.
- Editors (March–April 1984). "PBM Update: Adventures by Mail". The Space Gamer. No. 68. p. 51.
- Goldstone, Micah (August–September 2002). "Phoenix: Beyond the Stellar Empire" (PDF). Flagship. No. 97. p. 9. Describes updating of BSE into Phoenix: BSE.
- "The 1989 Origins Awards". The Game Manufacturers Association. Archived from the original on 2012-12-16.
- Lloyd, Vickie (September–October 1992). "BSE: The Good Times are Over". Paper Mayhem. No. 56. pp. 28–31.
- Marte, Stephen (March–April 1987). "Beyond the Stellar Empire". Paper Mayhem. No. 23. pp. 6–8.
- Marte, Stephen (November–December 1987). "Midgard". Paper Mayhem. No. 27. pp. 6–7.
- Marte, Stephen (November–December 1988). "Stellar Politics: Part II". Paper Mayhem. No. 33. pp. 18–20.
- McCourt, Mike (September–October 1997). "Beyond the Stellar Empire (BSE)". Paper Mayhem. No. 86. pp. 12–13.
- Muir, John (Spring 1985). "Beyond the Stellar Empire: An Overview". Flagship. No. 6. pp. 13–14.
- Muir, John (Spring 1985). "Freighter Firepower: Self-Defense in BSE". Flagship. No. 6. p. 15.
- Muir, John (Spring 1985). "The Starfleets of BSE". Flagship. No. 6. p. 16.
- Paper Mayhem (November–December 1987). "Best PBM Game of 1987". Paper Mayhem. No. 27. p. 2.
- Paper Mayhem (November–December 1988). "Best PBM Game of 1988". Paper Mayhem. No. 33. p. 2.
- Paper Mayhem (May–June 1989). "PBM Game Ratings: As of 3/30/89". Paper Mayhem. No. 36. p. 3.
- Paper Mayhem (July–August 1990). "PBM Game Ratings: As of 5-26-90". Paper Mayhem. No. 43. p. 64.
- Paper Mayhem (July–August 1993). "PBM Game Ratings: As of 06/06/93". Paper Mayhem. No. 61. pp. 44–45.
- Paper Mayhem (November–December 1994). "PBM Game Ratings: As of 9/12/94". Paper Mayhem. No. 69. pp. 44–45.
- Popolizio, Mike; LeBlanc, Liz; Popolizio, Marti (1990). "Revamping a Classic! The Redesign of BSE". Paper Mayhem. pp. 8–10.
- Razavi, Sid (March 2016). "Deep Dive into Phoenix: Beyond the Stellar Empire Part I - Getting Started" (PDF). Suspense and Decision. No. 16. PlayByMail.net. pp. 26–33.
- Razavi, Sid (September 2017). "Deep Dive into Phoenix: Beyond the Stellar Empire Part II: An Explorer's Guide" (PDF). Suspense and Decision. No. 17. PlayByMail.net. pp. 11–25.
- Redman, Kieron (April–May 2003). "Phoenix: First Impressions" (PDF). Flagship. No. 102. pp. 10–11. Describes first impressions after updating BSE into Phoenix: BSE.
