= List of Traveller books =

Traveller science fiction game publications

Traveller is an Origins Award winning science fiction role-playing game published by Game Designers' Workshop (GDW) in 1977. It is a time when interstellar travel has become possible and Humaniti has met other starfaring races. Traveller: 2300 portrayed humans as technologically advanced, but having a level of civilization not very far above the present day. Later publishers introduced additional material along the Official Traveller Universe timeline. In 2008, Mongoose Publishing reintroduced GDW's popular look and indexing feature separating publications into familiar Books, Supplements, and Adventures. Far Future Enterprises (FFE), has republished GDW's Traveller publications.

== Classic Traveller ==
There were four editions of the Classic Traveller rules sets:

- Traveller [Boxed set: Books 1-3], by GDW (1977)
- Traveller Deluxe Edition [Boxed set:: Books 0, 1–3, Adventure 0, map], by GDW (1981)
- The Traveller Book [Compiles books 1–3, plus parts of book 0], by GDW (1982)
- The Traveller Adventure, by GDW (1983), A companion volume for The Traveller Book
- Traveller Starter Edition by Marc W. Miller, GDW (1983)

=== Books ===
Basic Traveller comprised three black digest-sized books (1,2,3) that were not sold separately. The subsequent books presented additional rules on specific subjects, expanding on Traveller's basic concepts. They run 48 to 56 pages and require the basic rules sets. In addition to the core books, six more were published. FFE published all nine as a single volume in 2000. With the digest-sized format and color of the books, they became known as little black books.

- Book 1-Characters and Combat, by Marc W. Miller (1977)
- Book 2-Starships, by Marc W. Miller (1977)
- Book 3-Worlds and Adventures, by Marc W. Miller (1977)
- Book 4 Mercenary, by Frank Chadwick and Marc Miller (1978)
- Book 5 High Guard, by Marc Miller, Frank Chadwick, and John Harshman (1980)
- Book 0 An Introduction to Traveller, by Loren K. Wiseman (1981)
- Book 6 Scouts, by Marc Miller (1983)
- Book 7 Merchant Prince, by Marc W. Miller (1985)
- Book 8 Robots, by Sr. Joe D. Fugate and Timothy B. Brown (1986)
- The Classic Books 0-8, FFE (2000)

=== Supplements ===
Supplements provide different types of data, including starships, starsystems, characters, and animals in pre-generated form. Thirteen were published, but Supplement 5 Lightning Class Cruisers was only available as part of the Azhanti High Lightning board game. These were in little black book format. FFE published all thirteen as a single volume in 2000.

- Supplement 1-1001 Characters, by Marc Miller (1978)
- Supplement 2-Animal Encounters, by GDW (1979)
- Supplement 3-The Spinward Marches, by Marc Miller (1979)
- Supplement 4-Citizens of the Imperium, by Marc Miller (1979)
- Supplement 5 Lightning Class Cruisers, by GDW (1980)
- Supplement 6-76 Patrons, by Loren Wiseman (1980)
- Supplement 7-Traders and Gunboats, by Marc Miller (1980)
- Supplement 8-Library Data A-M, by Harshman, Miller, Wiseman, and Chadwick (1981)
- Supplement 9-Fighting Ships, by Chadwick, Miller, Brown, and Jaquays (1981)
- Supplement 10-The Solomani Rim, by John Harshman (1982)
- Supplement 11-Library Data N-Z, by John Harshman, Loren Wiseman and Marc Miller (1982)
- Supplement 12-Forms and Charts, by Marc Miller (1983)
- Supplement 13-Veterans, by Tim Brown (1983)
- Classic Traveller: Classic Supplements (2000)

=== Special Supplements ===
Short presentations on specific topics, originally appearing in the Journal of the Travellers' Aid Society (JTAS). Four were produced.

- Special Supplement 1: Merchant Prince, by J. Andrew Keith, Marc Miller and Loren Wiseman (1982). JTAS #12
- Special Supplement 2: Exotic Atmospheres, by J. Andrew Keith (1983). JTAS #17
- Special Supplement 3: Missiles in Traveller, by Marc Miller (1984). JTAS #21
- Special Supplement 4: The Lost Rules, by Don McKinney (2008).

Additionally, articles were compiled from the Journal of the Travellers' Aid Society in Best of the Journal of the Traveller's Aid Society, Volume 1 (1981), Best of the Journal of the Traveller's Aid Society, Volume 2 (1982), Best of the Journal of the Traveller's Aid Society, Volume 3 (1983), and Best of the Journal of the Traveller's Aid Society, Volume 4 (1984).

=== Adventures ===
Adventures provided interesting and challenging situations through which more information about the setting would unfold. Fourteen were produced. These were in little black book format. FFE published all fourteen as a single volume in 2000.

- Adventure 1-The Kinunir, by Marc Miller (1979)
- Adventure 2-Research Station Gamma, by Marc Miller (1980)
- Adventure 3-Twilight's Peak, by Marc Miller (1980)
- Adventure 4-Leviathan, by Bob McWilliams (1980)
- Traveller Adventure 0: Introductory Adventure: The Imperial Fringe, by GDW (1981)
- Adventure 5-Trillion Credit Squadron, by Marc Miller and John Harshman (1981)
- Adventure 6-Expedition to Zhodane, by Marc Miller (1981)
- Adventure 7-Broadsword, by Loren Wiseman (1982)
- Adventure 8-Prison Planet, by Eric Wilson and Dave Emigh (1982)
- Adventure 9-Nomads of the World Ocean, by J. Andrew Keith and William H. Keith (1983)
- Adventure 10-Safari Ship, by Marc Miller (1984)
- Adventure 11-Murder on Arcturus Station, by J. Andrew Keith (1983)
- Adventure 12-Secret of the Ancients, by Marc Miller (1984)
- Adventure 13 Signal GK, by Marc Miller (1985)
- Classic Traveller: Classic Adventures (2000) ISBN 978-1558782020
- Adventure 14 Travel Hazard, by Rob Eaglestone (2026)

=== Double Adventures ===
These combined two short adventures in a single 48-page book. Eight titles were produced, two in 2001, with one of those only a single adventure. Their tête-bêche format was popularised by the Ace Double sci-fi novels of the 1950s. These were in little black book format. FFE published all eight, plus Special Supplements 1–3, as a single volume in 2001.

- Double Adventure 1 Shadows / Annic Nova, by GDW (1980)
- Double Adventure 2 Mission on Mithril/Across the Bright Face, by Marc Miller (1980)
- Double Adventure 3 Death Station / Argon Gambit, by Marc Miller and Frank Chadwick (1981)
- Double Adventure 4 Marooned / Marooned Alone, by Loren Wiseman (1981)
- Double Adventure 5 Chamax Plague / Horde, by J. Andrew Keith and William H. Keith Jr. (1981)
- Double Adventure 6 Night of Conquest / Divine Intervention, by Lawrence Schick, William H. Keith Jr. and J. Andrew Keith (1982)
- Double Adventure 7 A Plague of Perruques / Stranded on Arden, (2001)
- Short Adventure 8 Memory Alpha, (2001)
- Double Adventure 1-6+ The Classic Short Adventures, Far Future Enterprises, (2001) ISBN 978-1558782037

=== Alien Modules ===
Each introduced a new alien race to players and referees, complete with character generation, history and background, language material, and an adventure. Eight were produced. FFE published all eight in two volumes volume in 2001.

- Alien Module 1-Aslan, by GDW (1984)
- Alien Module 2-K'kree, by J. Andrew Keith and Loren Wiseman (1984)
- Alien Module 3-Vargr, by J. Andrew Keith and Marc Miller (1984)
- Alien Module 4-Zhodani, by J. Andrew Keith and Marc Miller (1985)
- Traveller Alien Module 5 Droyne, by J. Andrew Keith and Marc Miller (1985)
- Alien Module 6-Solomani, by Marc Miller and William H. Keith Jr. (1986)
- Alien Module 7-Hivers, by J. Andrew Keith, Marc W. Miller and Loren K. Wiseman (1986)
- Alien Module 8-Darrians, by Marc W. Miller (1987)
- The Alien Modules 1-4 FFE (2001)
- The Alien Modules 5-8 FFE (2001)

=== Modules ===
Modules provided larger adventures and additional materials. Five were produced.

- M01 Tarsus: World Beyond the Frontier Take a SF Odyssey to Tarsus, [Box set: rules booklet, World Map of Tarsus, Subsector map of District 268, Detail Map of Tanglewald, Twelve character cards, 2 source books ], by GDW (1983) Marc Miller & loren K. Wismen
- M02 BeltStrike: Riches and Danger in the Bowman Belt [Box set], by J. Andrew Keith and John Harshman (1984)
- M03 The Spinward Marches Campaign: Adventures in a War-Ravaged Sector, by Marc Miller (1985)
- M04 Atlas of the Imperium, by GDW (1984)
- M05 Alien Realms (1986)

=== Boardgames ===
GDW was a boardgame publisher before it published Traveller, and as a result it published eight Traveller boardgames. FFE published all eight as a single volume in 2000.

- G0 Imperium [Boxed set: Rules booklet, 2 combat charts, terran/imperial counters, board/map], by Marc Miller, Frank Chadwick and John Harshman (1977)
- G2 Snapshot,Close Combat Aboard Starships in the Far Future. Boxed set: Rules Booklet, Map, Dice Modifier Sheet, counters, by Marc Miller, Paul R. Banner and Frank Chadwick (1979)
- G3 Azhanti High Lightning, Close Combat Aboard Starships in the Far Future [Boxed set: Rules Booklet, Supplement 5, 14 maps, Dice Modifier Sheet, counters], by Frank Chadwick and Marc Miller (1980)
- G6 Dark Nebula [Boxed set: rules, 8 maps, counters], by Marc Miller (1980)
- G1 Mayday [Boxed set: Rules booklet, 4 maps, counters] (1980)
- G4 Fifth Frontier War: Battles for the Spinward Marches [Boxed set: rules, maps, charts, 3 counter sheets] by Marc Miller, Frank Chadwick, John M. Astell and Paul R. Banner (1981)
- G5 Invasion: Earth The Final Battle of the Solomani Rim War [Boxed set: rules booklet, 480 die-cut counters, map, and charts], by Marc Miller, Frank Chadwick and John Astell (1981)
- G7 Striker : Rules for 15mm Traveller Miniatures [Boxed set: rules booklet 1, 2, 3, sequence tables, useful tables 1 & 2] by Marc Miller, Frank Chadwick and John Harshman (1981)
- The Classic Games 1-6+ FFE (2004)

=== Specials ===
GDW produced a variety of support materials for Traveller.

- Understanding Traveller [Short overview booklet], by GDW (1981)

=== Fanzines ===
- Alien Star (1981)

== Traveller: 2300 (2nd edition renamed to 2300 AD) ==
- Traveller: 2300 (version 1.0) [BOX SET: Player's manual, Referee's manual, Near Star List, The Tricolor's Shadow, forms], by Marc Miller, Tim Brown, Lester Smith, and Frank Chadwick (1987) GDW
- 2300 AD (Traveller: 2300, version 2.0) [BOX SET: Adventurer's Guide, Director's Guide, Near Star Map, Playaids], by Marc Miller, Tim Brown, Lester Smith, and Frank Chadwick (1988) GDW
- Star Cruiser [BOX SET: Naval Architect's Manual, Data Form Booklet, Rule and Scenario Booklet, 2 maps, Counter sheet (180 counters), 2 Combat charts], by Frank Chadwick

=== Sourcebooks ===
- Aurore Sourcebook [1010] (K)
- Colonial Atlas
- Earth/Cybertech Sourcebook [1015] (E)
- Equipment Guide
- Ground Vehicle [1036]
- Invasion (K)
- Kafer Sourcebook (K)
- Nyotekundu Sourcebook [1012]
- Ships of the French Arm [1011]

=== Adventures ===
- Bayern [1035]
- Beanstalk [1030]
- Deathwatch Program [1016] (E)
- Energy Curve [1031]
- Kafer Dawn [1032] (K)
- Mission Arcturus [1033] (K)
- Ranger [1038]
- Rotten to the Core [1017] (E)
  - (E)-Earth (cyberpunk subgenre)
  - (K)-Kafer War

== MegaTraveller ==
- Megatraveller [BOX SET: Player's Manual [0211], Referee's Manual [0212], Imperial Encyclopedia [0213], Map of Spinward Marches], by GDW (1987)
- Referee's Companion [0215] (1987)
- Rebellion Source Book [0214] (1988)
- COACC: Close Orbit and Airspace Control Command [0216] (1989)
- Fighting Ships of the Shattered imperium [0218] (1990)
- Knightfall [0219] (1990)
- Hard Times [0221] (1991)
- Assignment Vigilante [0223] (1992)
- Astrogators' Guide to the Diaspora Sector [0224] (1992)
- Arrival Vengeance [0225] (1992)
- Gazelle Class Close Escort [1015] (1991) by SGS Imperial Design Starship Deck Plans in 25mm Scale
- System Defense Boat and Jump Shuttle [1016] (1990) by SGS Imperial Design Starship Deck Plans in 25mm Scale
- Empress Marva [1017] (1990) by SGS Imperial Design Starship Deck Plans in 25mm Scale
- Subsidized Merchant [1019] (1990) by SGS Imperial Design Starship Deck Plans in 25mm Scale
- Lab Ship [1021] (1991) by SGS Imperial Design Starship Deck Plans in 25mm Scale

=== Digest Group Publications ===
- Grand Census (1987)
- Grand Survey (1987)
- 101 Robots (1987)
- 101 Vehicles (1988)
- The Early Adventures (1988)
- Starship Operator's Manual (1988)
- Referee's Gaming Kit (1989)
- World Builders' Handbook (1989)
- Alien - Vilani & Vargr (1990)
- The Flaming Eye Campaign Sourcebook (1990)
- Alien - Solomani & Aslan (1991)

== Traveller: The New Era ==
- Traveller: The New Era Core Rules, by GDW (1993)
- TNE Deluxe, [BOX SET: Rulebook; Fire Fusion & Steel, upgrade booklet, green player cards, map subsector data cards], by GDW (1993)
- Upgrade Booklet for Fire, Fusion, and Steel [0302/E1]
- Battle Rider [0308] (1993)
- Brilliant Lances [0303] (1993)
- Fire, Fusion, & Steel [0304] (1993)
- Survival Margin [0301] (1993)
- Path of Tears [0309] (1994)
- Reformation Coalition Equipment Guide [0310] (1994)
- Star Vikings [0315] (1994)
- Striker II [0313] (1994)
- Smash & Grab [0305] (1994)
- Traveller Players' Forms [0306] (1994 TBC)
- Traveller Referee's Screen [0307] (1994 TBC)
- World Tamer's Handbook [0311] (1994)
- Aliens of the Rim: Hivers and Ithklur [0318] (1995)
- The Guilded Lilly [0330] (1995)
- Regency Combat Vehicle Guide [0320] (1995)
- The Regency Sourcebook: Keepers of the Flame [0314] (1995)
- Vampire Fleets [0312] (1995)

== T4: Marc Miller's Traveller ==
- Marc Miller's Traveller: 4th ed., Imperium Games, Inc. (1996)
- Aliens Archive (1996)
- Central Supply Catalog (1996)
- Fire, Fusion, & Steel (1996)
- Traveller Game Screen (1996)
- JTAS25 (1996)
- Milieu 0-Memory Alpha (1996)
- Milieu 0-Campaign (1996)
- T4 Starships (1996)
- Adventure 1: Long Way Home (1997)
- Adventure 2: Gateway! (1997)
- Adventure 3: Annililik Run (1997)
- Anomalies (1997)
- Emperor's Arsenal (1997)
- Emperors Vehicles (1997)
- Imperial Squadrons (1997)
- JTAS26 (1997)
- Naval Architect's Manual (1997)
- Pocket Empires (1997)
- Psionics Institutes (1997)
- T4 First Survey (1997)
- Gateway to the Stars (1998)
- Missions of State (1998)

== GURPS Traveller ==
- GURPS Traveller, by Loren Wiseman (1998), published by Steve Jackson Games
- Alien Races 1, by David L. Pulver (1998) ISBN 978-1-55634-361-2
- Behind the Claw (1998)
- Alien Races 2 by Andy Slack, David Thomas, David L. Pulver (1999) ISBN 978-1-55634-392-6
- Far Trader (1999)
- First In (1999)
- GURPS Traveller, 2nd ed., by Loren Wiseman (1999)
- Star Mercs (1999)
- Starports (1999)
- Alien Races 3 (2000)
- Deck Plan 1-Beowulf Class Far Trader (2000)
- Ground Forces (2000)
- Planetary Survey 1-Kamsii (2000)
- Rim of Fire (2000)
- Alien Races 4 (2001)
- Planetary Survey 2-Denuli (2001)
- Deck Plan 2-Modular Cutter (2002)
- Deck Plan 3-Empress Marava Class Far Trader (2002)
- Deck Plan 4-Assault Cutter (2002)
- Deck Plan 5-Sulieman-Class Scout/Courier (2002)
- Deck Plan 6-Dragon Class System Defense Boat (2002)
- GM's Screen (2002)
- Heroes 1: Bounty Hunters (2002)
- Planetary Survey 3-Granicus (2002)
- Planetary Survey 4-Glisten (2002)
- Planetary Survey 5-Tobibak (2002)
- Planetary Survey 6-Darkmoon (2002)
- Heroes 2: Fighter Jocks (2003)
- Humanati (2003)
- Starships (2003)
- Modular Cutter (2004)
- Nobles (2004)
- Sword Worlds (2004)
- Interstellar Wars (2006)
- Droyne Coyn Set TBC

== Traveller20 ==
- The Traveller's Handbook, by QLI/RPGRealms Publishing (2002)s
- T20 Lite
- Traveller d20 Referee's Screen
- Gateway to Destiny (2004)
- Personal Weapons of Charted Space
- Yiarn Caardee Vehicle Catalog (2004)
- Traveller's Guidebook

=== Downloadable products ===
- 2320 AD (PDF), by QuikLink Interactive (2007)
- 2340 AD TBC
- Traveller Guidebook
- Personal Weapons of Charted Space (Traveller's Aide #1)
- Grand Endeavor (Traveller's Aide #2)
- On the Ground (Traveller's Aide #3)
- 76 Gunmen (Traveller's Aide #4)
- Objects of the Mind (Traveller's Aide #5)
- Against Gravity (Traveller's Aide #6)
- Fighting Ships (Traveller's Aide #7)
- Through the Waves (Traveller's Aide #8)
- Fighting Ships of the Solomani (Traveller's Aide #9)
- Stoner Express (EPIC Adventure #1)
- Into the Glimmer Drift (EPIC Adventure #2)
- Chimera (EPIC Adventure #3)
- Merchant Cruiser (EPIC Adventure #4)
- Scout Cruiser (EPIC Adventure #5)
- Mercenary Cruiser (EPIC Adventure #6)
- Merc Heaven (EPIC Adventure #7)
- The Forgotten War (Golden Age Adventure #1)
- The Gabriel Enigma (Golden Age Adventure #2)
- The Sydymic Outworlds Cluster (Special Supplement #1)
- The Mahkahraik (Free Download)
- Revelation Station (Scenes of Adventure #1)

== Traveller Hero ==
- Book 1: Adventurers in Charted Space: Character Creation, Psionics, Combat and Races, Rob Bruce, Kevin Walsh and Randy Hollingsworth (2007) Comstar Gamess
- Book 2: Adventure in Charted Space: The Imperium, Gadgets, Vehicles, Robots and Starships (2007)
- Golden Age Starships 1: Fast Courier
- Golden Age Starships 2: SW Patrol cruiser
- Golden Age Starships 3: Archaic Small Craft
- Golden Age Starships 4: Boats and Pinnaces
- Golden Age Starships 5: Cutters and Shuttles
- Golden Age Starships 6: Corsair
- Golden Age Starships 7: Modular Starship
- Golden Age Starships 8: Armed Free Trader

== Mongoose Traveller ==
=== Books ===
- Mongoose Traveller Core Rulebook, by Gareth Hanrahan (2008)s
- Character Record Pack, by Matthew Sprange and Richard Ford (2009)
- Golden Age Starships Compilation, by Simon Beal and Martin J. Dougherty (2009)
- Traveller Core Rulebook Pocket Edition, by Gareth Hanrahan (2009)
- Referee's Screen, by Mongoose Publishing (2009)
- Compendium 1, by Mongoose Publishing (2010)
- Compendium 2, by Mongoose Publishing (2012)
- Traveller Book 0: An Introduction to Traveller by Gareth Hanrahan (2008), ISBN 978-1-906103-85-9, MGP3808
- Book 1 Mercenary (2008)
- Book 1 Mercenary Second Edition
- Book 2 High Guard, by Gareth Hanrahan (2008)
- Book 3 Scout, by Lawrence Whitaker, (2009). ISBN 978-1906508005
- Book 4 Psion, by Gareth Hanrahan (2009)
- Book 5 Agent, by Gareth Hanrahan (2009)
- Book 6 Scoundrel, by Gareth Hanrahan (2009)
- Book 7 Merchant Prince, by Bryan Steele (2010)
- Book 8 Dilettante, by Pete Nash (2010)
- Book 9 Robot, by Uri Kurlianchik (2010)
- Book 10 Cosmopolite, by Alex Greene (2014)

=== Classic Traveller ===
- Book 9 Pirates, by Rob Eaglestone (2025), MGP10001

=== Little Black Books (LBB) ===
- LBB 1 - Mercenary (2010)
- LBB 2 - High Guard, by Mongoose Publishing (2010)
- LBB 3 - Scout, by Mongoose Publishing (2010)
- LBB 4 - Psion, by Mongoose Publishing (2010)
- LBB 5 - Agent, by Mongoose Publishing (2010)
- LBB 6 - Scoundrel, by Mongoose Publishing (2010)
- LBB 7 - Merchant Prince, by Mongoose Publishing (2010)
- LBB 8 - Dilettante, by Mongoose Publishing (2010)
- LBB 9 - Library Data, by Mongoose Publishing (2010)

=== Supplements ===
- Supplement 1 - 760 Patrons, by Mongoose Publishing (2008)
- Supplement 2 - Traders and Gunboats, by Bryan Steele (2008)
- Supplement 3 - Fighting Ships, by Bryan Steele and Stuart Machin (2009)
- Supplement 4 - Central Supply Catalog, by Martin J. Dougherty and Bryan Steele (2009)
- Supplement 5 - Civilian Vehicles, by Simon Beal and Martin J. Dougherty (2009)
- Supplement 6 - Military Vehicles, by Simon Beal and Martin J. Dougherty (2009)
- Supplement 7 - 1001 Characters, by August Hahn (2010)
- Supplement 8 - Cybernetics, by Lawrence Whitaker (2011)
- Supplement 9 - Campaign Guide, by August Hahn (2011)
- Supplement 10 - Merchants and Cruisers (2011)
- Supplement 11 - Animal Encounters, by August Hahn (2011)
- Supplement 12 - Dynasty, by Mongoose Publishing (2011)
- Supplement 5 & 6 - The Vehicle Handbook, by Colin Dunn, Matthew Sprange, Nick Robinson and Jonathan Goodyear (2012)
- Supplement 13 - Starport Encounters
- Supplement 14 - Space Stations
- Supplement 15 - Powers and Principalities
- Supplement 16 - Adventure Seeds

=== Adventures ===
- Adventure 1 - Beltstrike, by Lawrence Whittaker (2009)
- Adventure 2 - Prison Planet, Garth Hanrahan (2009)
- Adventure 3 - Trillion Credit Squadron
- Adventure 4 - Into The Unknown

=== Third Imperium ===
- Spinward Marches, by Martin J Dougherty (2008)
- Alien Module 1: Aslan, by Gareth Hanrahan (2009)
- Alien Module 2: Vargr, by Simon Beal (2009)
- Tripwire, by Simon Beal (2009)
- Alien Module 3: Darrians, by Pete Nash 2010 ISBN 978-1907218613
- Crowded Hours, by Mongoose Publishing (2010)
- Reft Sector, by Martin J. Dougherty (2010)
- Reign of Discordia, by Darrin Drader (2010)
- Sector Fleet by Mongoose Publishing (2010)
- Starports, by Mongoose Publishing (2011)
- Alien Module 4: Zhodani, by Don McKinney (2011)
- Alien Module 5: Solomani, by David Pulver (2012)
- Aramis: The Traveller Adventure, by Marc Miller (2012)
- Deneb Sector, by Rob Eaglestone (2012)
- Sword Worlds, by Bryan Steele (2012)
- Alien Module 6: Droyne
- Armageddon 2089
- Campaign 1: Secrets of the Ancients
- Minor Alien Module 1: Luriani
- Project Steel
- The Spinward Marches Map Pack
- The Trojan Reaches Map Pack
- The Gvurrdon Map Pack
- Starship Operator's Manual (2024)

==== Traveller 2300 ====
- Traveller: 2300AD, by Colin Dunn (2012)
- French Arm Adventures (2013)
- Tools for Frontier Living (2013)
- Ships of the French Arm
- The Grendelssaga
- Bayern (tbc)
- Atlas of the French Arm (tbc)

== Traveller5 ==
- Traveller5 Core Rulebook by Marc Miller, Far Future Enterprises (2013)

== Mongoose Traveller (Second Edition) ==
- Traveller: Traveller in the Universe of Babylon 5 (MGP3811)
- Traveller: Traveller in the Worlds of Hammer's Slammers (MGP3817)
- Traveller: Core Rulebook (MGP40000)
- Traveller: Core Rulebook - Update 2022 (MGP40058)
- Traveller: Companion (MGP40007)
- Traveller: Companion - Update 2024 (MGP40101)
- Traveller: Central Supply Catalogue (MGP40003)
- Traveller: Central Supply Catalogue - Update 2023 (MGP40095)
- Traveller: High Guard (MGP40002)
- Traveller: High Guard - Update 2022 (MGP40087)
- Traveller: Vehicle Handbook (MGP40004)
- Traveller: Referee's Screen (MGP40005)
- Traveller: Referee's Screen - Update 2024 (MGP40106)
- Traveller: Starter Set (MGP4008)
- Traveller: Specialist Forces (MGP40065)
- Traveller: High Guard – Aslan (MGP40991)
- Traveller: High Guard – Deployment Shuttle (MGP40995)
- Traveller: Field Catalogue (MGP40067)
- Traveller: Explorer's Edition (MGP40074)
- Traveller: Sector Construction Guide (MGP40076)
- Traveller: Robot Handbook (MGP40085)
- Traveller: World Builder's Handbook (MGP40100)
- Traveller: Adventure Class Ships (MGP40105)
- Traveller: Small Craft Catalogue (MGP40108)
- Traveller: The Imperial Navy (MGP40099)
- Traveller: Aliens of Charted Space - Volume 1 (MGP40047)
- Traveller: Aliens of Charted Space - Volume 2 (MGP40048)
- Traveller: Aliens of Charted Space - Volume 3 (MGP40094)
- Traveller: Aliens of Charted Space - Volume 4 (MGP40103)
- Traveller: Starship Operator's Manual (MGP40121)
- Traveller: Bounty Hunter (MGP40123)
- Traveller: Traders and Gunboats (MGP40128)
- Traveller: Merchant's Edition (MGP40130)
- Traveller: Clans of the Aslan (MGP40131)
- Traveller: Vehicle Handbook - Update 2026 (MGP40146)

=== Adventure ===
- Traveller: Marches Adventure 1: High and Dry (MGP40001)
- Traveller: Marches Adventure 2: Mission to Mithril (MGP40017)
- Traveller: The Marches Adventures 1-5 (MGP40097)
- Traveller: Reach Adventure 1: Marooned on Marduk (MGP40006)
- Traveller: Reach Adventure 2: Theories of Everything (MGP40010)
- Traveller: Reach Adventure 3: The Calixcuel Incident (MGP40011)
- Traveller: Reach Adventure 4: Last Flight of Amuar (MGP40012)
- Traveller: Reach Adventure 5 - The Borderland Run (MGP40018)
- Traveller: Reach Adventure 6 - Exodus (MGP40022)
- Traveller: Reach Adventure 7: The Last Train Out of Rakken-Goll (MGP40035)
- Traveller: Reach Adventure 8 - Makergod (MGP40111)
- Traveller: Great Rift Adventure 1: Islands in the Rift (MGP40015)
- Traveller: Great Rift Adventure 2: Deepnight Endeavour (MGP40014)
- Traveller: Great Rift Adventure 3: Flatlined (MGP40016)
- Traveller: Great Rift Adventure 4: The lost Garden
- Traveller: Great Rift Adventure 5: The Undying
- Traveller: Great Rift Adventures 1-5 (MGP40142)
- Traveller: Naval Adventure 1 - Shakedown Cruise (MGP40020)
- Traveller: Naval Adventure 2 - Showing the Sunburst (MGP40021)
- Traveller: Naval Adventure 3 - Fire on the Sindalian Main (MGP40036)
- Traveller: Naval Adventure 4 - Enemy of My Enemy (MGP40052)
- Traveller: Solomani Adventure 1 - Mysteries on Arcturus Section (MGP40053)
- Traveller: Solomani Adventure 2 - The Bell of Rocamadour (MGP40056)
- Traveller: Deneb Adventure 1 - The Lost Duke (MGP40057)
- Traveller: Core Adventure 1 - Invasive Species (MGP40061)
- Traveller: Core Adventure 2 - Last Call at Eneri's Cantina (MGP40062)
- Traveller: Core Adventure 3 - Errant Lightning Adventure (MGP40063)
- Traveller: Mercenary Adventure 1 - Verloren Hoop (MGP40068)
- Traveller: Mercenary Adventure 2 - Bug Hunt (MGP40069)
- Traveller: Mercenary Adventure 3 - Must Travel, Need Guns (MGP40070)

=== Boxed Sets ===
- Traveller: The Great Rift (MGP40013)
- Traveller: Deep-night Revelation (MGP40040)
- Traveller: Mercenary (MGP40064)
- Traveller: Element Class Cruisers Blueprints (MGP44444)

=== Campaign ===
- Traveller: The Pirates of Drinax (MGP40009)
- Traveller: Drinaxian Companion (MGP40034)
- Traveller: Shadows of Sindal (MGP40037)
- Traveller: Skandersvik (MGP40039)
- Traveller: Deepnight Revelation - Riftsedge Transit (MGP40041)
- Traveller: Deepnight Revelation - Near Side of Yonder (MGP40042)
- Traveller: Deepnight Revelation - The Crossing (MGP40043)
- Traveller: Deepnight Revelation - The Far Side of Nowhere (MGP40044)
- Traveller: Deepnight Revelation - Voidshore (MGP40045)
- Traveller: Deepnight Revelation - Expeditions (MGP40046)
- Traveller: Secrets of the Ancients (MGP40072)
- Traveller: Mysteries of the Ancients (MGP40105)
- Traveller: Wrath of the Ancients (MGP40115)
- Traveller: The Order of Prometheus (MGP40096)
- Traveller: Whispers on the Abyss ( MGP40114)
- Traveller: The Fifth Frontier War (MGP40118)
- Traveller: Cluster Truck (MGP40144)

=== Region Sourcebook ===
- Traveller: Behind the Claw (MGP 40025)
- Traveller: Sword Worlds (MGP40038)
- Traveller: The Glorious Empire (MGP40049)
- Traveller: Solomani Front (MGP40051)
- Traveller: Mercenaries of Chartered Space (MGP40066)
- Traveller: The Third Imperium (MGP40073)
- Traveller: The Spinward Extents (MGP40075)
- Traveller: Spinward Marches 1: The Bowman Arm (MGP40997)
- Traveller: Spinward Marches 2: The Lunion Shield Worlds (MGP40090)
- Traveller: The Trailing Frontier (MGP40098)
- Traveller: Rim Expeditions (MGP40103)
- Traveller: The Deep and the Dark (MGP40112)
- Traveller: The Borderland (MGP40133)
- Traveller: The Core Expeditions (MGP40147)

=== Magazine ===
- Journal of the Travellers' Aid Society Volume One (MGP40027)
- Journal of the Travellers' Aid Society Volume Two (MGP40028)
- Journal of the Travellers' Aid Society Volume Three (MGP40029)
- Journal of the Travellers' Aid Society Volume Four (MGP40030)
- Journal of the Travellers' Aid Society Volume Five (MGP40031)
- Journal of the Travellers' Aid Society Volume Six (MGP40032)
- Journal of the Travellers' Aid Society Volume Seven (MGP40078)
- Journal of the Travellers' Aid Society Volume Eight (MGP40029)
- Journal of the Travellers' Aid Society Volume Nine (MGP40080)
- Journal of the Travellers' Aid Society Volume Ten (MGP40081)
- Journal of the Travellers' Aid Society Volume Eleven (MGP40082)
- Journal of the Travellers' Aid Society Volume Twelve (MGP40083)
- Journal of the Travellers' Aid Society Volume Thirteen (MGP40134)
- Journal of the Travellers' Aid Society Volume Fourteen (MGP40135)
- Journal of the Travellers' Aid Society Volume Fifteen (MGP40136)
- Journal of the Travellers' Aid Society Volume Sixteen (MGP40137)
- Journal of the Travellers' Aid Society Volume Seventeen (MGP40138)
- Journal of the Travellers' Aid Society Volume Eighteen (MGP40139)

== Books by third party publishers ==
=== Ad Astra Products ===
- World Displays

=== Baron Publications ===
- Imperial Form 1

=== FASA ===
==== Adventures ====
- Action Aboard: Adventures on the King Richard
- Fate of the Sky Raiders
- The Legend of the Sky Raiders
- Ordeal by Eshaar
- Rescue on Galatea
- The Trail of the Sky Raiders
- Uragyad'n of the Seven Pillars

==== Supplements ====
- Adventure Class Ships, Vol. I
- Adventure Class Ships, Vol. II
- Aslan Mercenary Ships
- Far Traveller No. 1
- The FCI Consumer Guide by Steve Harmon [A5]
- High Passage
- I.S.C.V.: King Richard
- I.S.C.V.: Leander
- I.S.P.M.V.: Fenris / S.F.V. Valkyrie
- I.S.P.M.V.: Tethys
- Merchant Class Ships
- Star Port Module Number One: The Hotel Complex
- The Stazhiekh Report/The Harrensa Project
- ZISMV: Vlezhdatl

=== Gamelords ===
==== Adventures ====
- Ascent To Anekthor
- The Drenslaar Quest
- Duneraiders

==== Supplements ====
- The Desert Environment
- Lee's Guide to Interstellar Adventure
- The Mountain Environment
- A Pilot's Guide to the Drexilthar Subsector
- Startown Liberty
- The Undersea Environment
- Wanted: Adventurers

=== Games Workshop ===
- IISS Ship Files (1981)
- Starship Lay-Out Sheets (1981)
- Traveller Personal Data Files (1981)

=== Grenadier ===
- Disappearance on Aramat

=== Group One ===
==== Adventures ====
- Geptorem
- Hydronaut
- Mission to Zephor
- Nithus
- Nystalux
- Port Xanatath

==== Supplements ====
- Encounters in the Corelian Quadrant
- Encounters in the Phoenix Quadrant
- Encounters in the Ventura Quadrant
- Lomodo IVa
- Pen-Latol's World
- Marinagua!
- Sapies
- Theta Borealis Sector
- Warbor-Parn

=== Judges Guild ===
==== Adventures ====
- Amycus Probe
- Corsairs of the Turku Waste
- Darkling Ship
- Darthanon Queen
- Dra'k'ne Station
- Marooned on Ghostring
- Rogue Moon of Spinstorme
- Simba Safari
- Tancred

==== Supplements ====
- The Astrogators Chartbook
- Crucis Margin
- Doom of the Singing Star
- Fifty Starbases
- Glimmerdrift Reaches
- Ley Sector (1980)
- Maranantha-Alkahest Sector (1981)
- Navigator's Starcharts
- Starships & Spacecraft(1979)
- The Traveller Logbook (1979)
- Traveller Referee Screens (1978)
- Waspwinter

=== Marischal Adventures ===
- Fleetwatch
- Flight of the Stag
- Salvage Mission
- Trading Team

=== Paranoia Press ===
- Beyond
- Merchants & Merchandise
- Personal Data Sheet
- Planetary Data Sheet
- Scouts & Assassins
- Ship's Papers
- SORAG (1981)
- Starship Log
- System Data Sheet
- Traveller Record Sheets
- Vanguard Reaches

=== R. Warfield Game Design ===
- Evening Star

=== Sage Lore Productions ===
- Science Fiction Players Survival Kit

=== Seeker Gaming Systems ===
- Empress Marava II 400-Ton Merchant
- Escape
- Express Boat, Tender, and Scout Ship
- Five Small Craft of the Imperium
- Gazelle Class Close Escort
- Laboratory Ship
- Subsidized Merchant 400 Ton
- System Defense Boat and Jump Shuttle

== See also ==
- Traveller (role-playing game)
- J. Andrew Keith
- Joe Fugate
- Gary L. Thomas
- Marc William Miller
- Frank Chadwick
- John Harshman
- Loren Wiseman
- Gareth Hanrahan
