= British Isles Traveller Support =

Role-playing game publisher

BITS UK Limited
- Industry: Role-playing games
- Founded: 1995; 31 years ago
- Headquarters: Harlow, Essex, UK.
- Key people: Andy Lilly
- Products: 101 Books series; Power Projection; At Close Quarters
- Website: www.bitsuk.net

Known in the gaming industry by their acronymic trademark BITS UK, this fan-owned game design company provided and continues to provide licensed product for the Traveller Role Playing Game.

They are licensed by Marc W. Miller to use the Traveller setting and trademarks. They are also licensed by Jon Tuffley to use and adapt his Full Thrust game engine.

They are also noted for their activities in support of all editions of the Traveller RPG in British and European gaming conventions. They are the organizers of the TravCon Traveller gaming convention.

== Product lines ==
BITS has several product lines:

- 101 Books—a series of books usable with multiple editions of Traveller RPG. They are inspired by the Supplement 1: 1001 Characters and Supplement 6: 76 Patrons books by GDW and the 101 Vehicles and 101 Robots books by Digest Group Productions.
- Power Projection—an adaptation of the Full Thrust game engine to the Traveller Setting.
- At Close Quarters—an add-on board game and miniatures game for the Marc Miller's Traveller edition of Traveller.
- Software—Bits acts as a releasing house for several authors Traveller support software, including Universe, InifiV, GURPS Traveller Shipyard and GURPS Traveller Bestiary.
- Informational Publications—an illustrated Bibliography of the Traveller RPG, and an index of magazine articles for the Traveller game in a variety of media.

The Long Way Home was the inaugural supplement in 1996 for the revised Traveller system, published by BITS organization, despite delays from Imperium Games.
