= Deneb Sector =

Tabletop role-playing game supplement

Deneb Sector is a supplement for the science fiction role-playing game Traveller that was created as a charity fundraiser in 1984. Although the authors had permission of the Traveller game designer to publish the unlicensed product, official Traveller material was released later the same year that superseded the material in this book.

== Contents ==
Deneb Sector provides details of the planets and subsectors of the Deneb Sector. Unlike similar Traveller books published by Games Designers Workshop (GDW), which only contain planetary data, this book also contains ideas for adventure and the outline for an extended adventure on which to base a campaign.

== Publication history ==
GDW first produced the science fiction role-playing game Traveller in 1977. Six years later, in 1983, Graham Staplehurst and David Hulks came up with the idea of creating and selling an unofficial Traveller book to raise money for the Save the Children Fund. Over the next year, Staplehurst and Hulks wrote Deneb Sector, a 60-page digest-sized book produced in the graphic style of GDW's Traveller books. In a letter to the editors of Imagine that was published in Issue #26, Staplehurst stated that the adventure was written intended for the zine Quasits and Quasars, and that when he decided to self-publish it, Traveller game designer Marc Miller granted permission to add the name "Traveller" to the cover.

Later in 1984, GDW published an official Deneb sector map in Atlas of the Imperium that invalidated the material in Deneb Sector.

== Reception ==
In Issue 29 of Imagine (August 1985), Jim Bambra thought that this self-published book was actually "a great improvement on GDW's own Spinward Marches and Solomani Rim. Instead of just supplying pages and pages of subsector maps and statistics, it provides adventure ideas for many worlds and an extended campaign adventure." Bambra did find that the scenario ideas would require a lot of preparation work in order to be useful, and he also found the "printing is not up to professional standards." Nonetheless, he strongly recommended this book, saying, "Even if you never run any adventures in Deneb Sector, this is well worth the money for the information provided. There are enough good ideas in here to enhance any Traveller campaign - and the money is going to a good cause."
