= The Traveller Book =

Science-fiction role-playing game

- Cover by William H. Keith, Jr.
- Designers: Marc W. Miller
- Publishers: Game Designers' Workshop
- Publication: 1982; 43 years ago
- Genres: Science fiction
- Systems: Classic Traveller

The Traveller Book is a 1982 role-playing game supplement for Traveller, designed by Marc W. Miller, and published by Game Designers' Workshop.

== Contents ==
The Traveller Book is a hardcover book which includes most of the text from the Traveller second-edition basic rulebooks, as well as the more significant parts of Traveller Book 0, a large portion of Traveller Double Adventure 1, some of the entries from 76 Patrons, and information and library data for the universe.

== Reception ==
Games included The Traveller Book in their "Top 100 Games of 1982", praising its "exceptionally thorough rules and sample adventures" for getting started with science-fiction role-playing games.

William A. Barton reviewed The Traveller Book in The Space Gamer No. 59. Barton commented that "I certainly wish that The Traveller Book had been available when I first started playing Traveller, and especially when I started reffing. If you already own the second-edition rules, you may find the extra [...] the hardback will cost you a big much for now. But If you're still using the first-edition rules, I'd recommend that you go ahead and invest in it."

In the February 1983 edition of White Dwarf (Issue #38), Phil Masters reviewed The Traveller Book, the large book revision that had just been published, and liked the new introductory material. He found that "The production of the book is generally good; spelling errors have been largely eliminated, while tables are concentrated on specific pages, leaving clean blocks of text broken only by some acceptable illustrations." While he had some minor issues, he concluded by giving it a high rating of 9 out of 10, calling it "a work of quality by any standards."

In the November 1983 edition of Imagine, Jim Bambra gave a strong recommendation for The Traveller Book, the large book revision that had just been published, stating, "If you have never played Traveller and wish to start, now is a good time. Never before has it been as easy to get started."

In the November 1983 edition of Different Worlds (Issue #31), Tony Watson reviewed The Traveller Book and complimented the "profusely illustrated" book, which "has done a good job of linking the pictures to the text with which they appear." Watson also liked the placement of relevant charts and tables, calling the organization "a distincet improvement over the first edition rules." He also liked the expanded equipment section, and "the new emphasis on encounters... the core events in any role-playing session." He concluded by calling this edition "a significant improvement of an already excellent game system."

== See also ==
- The Traveller Adventure - Companion adventure
- Classic Traveller books
