= Traveller Adventure 5: Trillion Credit Squadron =

Science-fiction role-playing game supplement

Adventure 5
Trillion Credit Squadron
- Designers: Marc Miller; John Harshman
- Publishers: Game Designers' Workshop
- Publication: 1981; 44 years ago
- Genres: Science fiction
- Systems: Classic Traveller

Traveller Adventure 5: Trillion Credit Squadron is a 1981 role-playing game adventure for Traveller, written by Marc Miller, John Harshman and published by Game Designers' Workshop. Players each design their own fighting starship squadrons within a budget of one trillion credits (Cr1,000,000,000,000) and fight them against each other.

== Plot summary ==
Trillion Credit Squadron is an adventure consisting of combat between squadrons of starships.

== Reception ==
William A. Barton reviewed Trillion Credit Squadron in The Space Gamer No. 46. Barton commented that "All in all, if you're looking for guidelines on fleet actions – whether you're into role-playing or not – Trillion Credit Squadron is definitely worth buying."

== Notoriety ==
Traveller TCS is notable as one of the first games to be mastered by a computer. Starting in 1981, Douglas Lenat adapted his heuristic discovery system named Eurisko to create fleets for the US national championship, and won on two occasions. On the first occasion this involved a large number of stationary, lightly-armored ships with many small weapons. This resulted in extensive changes to the game's rules. On the second occasion in 1982, Eurisko won again when the program discovered that the rules permitted the program to destroy its own ships, permitting it to continue to use much the same strategy. Tournament officials announced that if Eurisko won another championship the competition would be abolished; Lenat retired Eurisko from the game. Richard Feynman discusses these events in his dynamic workshop, Idiosyncratic Thinking.

== Reviews ==
- Dragon #58 (Feb. 1982)

== See also ==
- Traveller Book 5: High Guard - Ship design system used by this adventure
- Classic Traveller adventures
