= The Traveller Adventure =

Tabletop role-playing game

- Cover by William H. Keith.
- Designers: Frank Chadwick; John Harshman; J. Andrew Keith; Marc W. Miller; Loren Wiseman
- Publishers: Game Designers' Workshop
- Publication: 1983; 43 years ago
- Genres: Science fiction
- Systems: Classic Traveller

The Traveller Adventure is a campaign of linked adventures published by Game Designers' Workshop in 1983 for the science fiction tabletop role-playing game Traveller, and a companion volume for The Traveller Book.

== Plot summary ==
The Traveller Adventure is a campaign of linked scenarios in the Aramis subsector involving the crew of the March Harrier subsidized merchant vessel.

== Publication history ==
GDW created Traveller in 1977, and it quickly became popular. GDW subsequently released a large number of expansions, modules, and adventures including the campaign book The Traveller Adventure, written by Frank Chadwick, John Harshman, J. Andrew Keith, Marc W. Miller, and Loren Wiseman, with a cover by William H. Keith. It was designed to be a companion volume to the previously published The Traveller Book.

== Reception ==
Craig Sheeley reviewed The Traveller Adventure in Space Gamer No. 70. Sheeley commented that "I was pleasantly surprised by The Traveller Adventure [...] it is reasonably price. It is, on the whole, one of the best products ever made by GDW."

Stephen Nutt reviewed The Traveller Adventure for Imagine magazine, and stated that "I rate [The Traveller Adventure] in the top five best role-playing products that have ever been placed on the market. In the context of Traveller it is the best thing GDW have ever produced, simply a must for anybody running a Traveller campaign."

Andy Slack reviewed The Traveller Adventure for White Dwarf #57, giving it an overall rating of 9 out of 10, and stated that "this is a superb campaign capable of entertaining a group of up to 8 players of any experience for up to a year."

Tony Watson reviewed The Traveller Adventure for Different Worlds magazine and stated that "The Traveller Adventure is really a nice piece of work. The campaign described has all the elements of a good adventure story and would serve for several months' worth of game playing for even the most dedicated group. It is full of scenario ideas and information for the gamemaster who wishes to use it as more of a sourcebook. Given the price, it is only a little more than a pair of GDW's regular adventure books, it is a bargain considering that it is well designed and interesting."

In his 1990 book The Complete Guide to Role-Playing Games, game critic Rick Swan highly recommended this as one of the best Traveller adventures, albeit for "ambitious referees", calling it "a 150-plus-page campaign involving a devious interstellar smuggling operation and a memorable villain."

== See also ==
- The Traveller Book - Companion rulebook
- Classic Traveller books
