= Traveller Book 6: Scouts =

Science-fiction role-playing game supplement

Book 6: Scouts
- Designers: Marc Miller
- Publishers: Game Designers' Workshop
- Publication: 1983; 42 years ago
- Genres: Science-fiction
- Systems: Classic Traveller

Traveller Book 6: Scouts is a tabletop role-playing game supplement, written by Marc Miller for Traveller, and published by Game Designers' Workshop in 1983.

== Contents ==
Scouts is a supplement which presents additional systems for character generation related to the Scout Service, and also includes an expanded system for world generation. The Scout Service is a fictional intersteller exploration organization.

== Publication history ==
An updated edition titled Book 3 Scout, written by Lawrence Whitaker, was published by Mongoose Publishing in 2009.

== Reception ==
Tony Watson reviewed Scouts in Ares Magazine #17 and commented that "Scouts adds much to Scout characters and especially to the generation of star systems and worlds. These latter rules and great detail to star systems, and a correspondingly greater cost in time and effort to create subsectors. Its value then, depends on how anxious the referee is to include the new information in his campaign."

Andy Slack reviewed Scouts for White Dwarf #53, giving the supplement 7/10 overall and stated that it was "Not as clear as earlier Traveller materials. If you want to generate or GM detailed Traveller star-systems, and have a lot of time to spare, this is the item for you. If you simply want expanded scout characters, then egotism aside Star Patrol is similar and cheaper."

Stephen Nutt reviewed Scouts, Book 6 for Imagine magazine, and stated that "It is hard to say that GDW have done more than half succeed with this one."

Terry Mcinnes reviewed Scouts for Different Worlds magazine and stated that "In spite of [its] complexity, Book 6 is basic material for all Traveller players and is indispensable to gamemasters for planning colorful, scientifically accurate campaigns. Scouts truly adds a new dimension to Traveller adventure."

== See also ==
- Classic Traveller Books
