= Traveller Adventure 2: Research Station Gamma =

Tabletop science-fiction role-playing game supplement

Adventure 2
Research Station Gamma
- Designers: Marc W. Miller
- Publishers: Game Designers' Workshop
- Publication: 1980; 46 years ago
- Genres: Science fiction
- Systems: Classic Traveller

Traveller Adventure 2: Research Station Gamma is an adventure published by Game Designers' Workshop in 1980 for the science fiction role-playing game Traveller. Written by Marc W. Miller.

== Plot summary ==
Research Station Gamma is an adventure in which the player characters are trapped on the water world Vanejen. They are approached by an indigenous alien, who asks them to rescue his family from imprisonment in a top-secret Imperial Research Station.

Extra material includes rules on Tech 5 submersibles (roughly analogous to World War 2 submarines), information on the planet Vanejen and its major lifeforms, information and maps about Research Station Gamma, and rumours the adventurers hear during the adventure.

== Reception ==
In the August 1980 edition of The Space Gamer (Issue No. 30) William Barton was impressed by the adventure, saying, "Research Station Gamma has to be considered a worthy addition to the expanding Traveller family. All referees - and probably a lot of players, too - should want to add this one to their collections, not only for the rousing adventure, but for the abundance of new information as well."

Anders Swenson reviewed Research Station Gamma for Different Worlds magazine and stated that "The activities in Research Station Gamma will definitely have lasting consequence, and a sequel adventure is promised to tie up various themes suggested in the present volume. Finally, the author's system of creating and mapping a world should be of interest to all referees concerned with world-building, whether they run Traveller worlds or sword & sorcery campaigns."

In the March 1981 edition of Dragon (Issue 47), Tony Watson thought this was "a very interesting supplement for Traveller. The concept of the station is fascinating and well handled." Watson highly recommended Research Station Gamma, saying, "The mystery that faces the adventurers is, in my opinion, the best of all the [Traveller] adventure supplements published to date. The booklet should serve as a useful source of ideas for any Traveller ref."

In his 1990 book The Complete Guide to Role-Playing Games, game critic Rick Swan highly recommended this as one of the best Traveller adventures.

== See also ==
- Classic Traveller adventures
