= Traveller Starter Edition =

Science-fiction role-playing game

- Cover by David R. Deitrick.
- Designers: Marc W. Miller
- Publishers: Game Designers' Workshop
- Publication: 1983; 42 years ago
- Genres: Science-fiction
- Systems: Classic Traveller

Traveller Starter Edition is a boxed Tabletop role-playing game, written by Marc W. Miller, and published by Game Designers' Workshop in 1983 for Traveller. Traveller Starter Edition revised both the style and the packaging for the Traveller system.

== Contents ==
The boxed set contains;

- Rules Booklet (64 pages)
- Charts and Tables (24 pages)
- Adventure booklet, double-sided 16-page booklet two adventures, Mission on Mithril, and Shadows
- Player's Handout sheet
- Double-sided color map for Mithril/Shadows
- Player's Handout sheet

== Reception ==
In the December 1983 edition of White Dwarf (Issue #48), Andy Slack reviewed the Traveller Starter Edition, the fourth revision of the basic rules, and called it "still the best science fiction role-playing game on the market; it has an almost perfect balance between realism and playability." Slack's only complaint about this edition was the references to self improvement and drugs, but the rules for those two subjects had not been included in this edition. This was serious enough that Slack advised new players to buy the standard basic rules set rather than this edition, although he did give it an above-average rating of 8 out of 9.

Jim Bambra reviewed Traveller Starter Edition for Imagine magazine, and stated that "If you have never played Traveller and wish to start, now is a good time. Never before has it been as easy to get started."

Frederick Paul Kiesche III reviewed Traveller Starter Edition in Space Gamer No. 67. Kiesche commented that "I would recommend the Starter Edition for those who are interested in Traveller or those who are looking for a good edition of the rules to give to someone who is starting out in the game. The mix of material, rules and adventures makes it perfect for those who wish to play Traveller, want to run some adventures without much work, and desire enough information on the Traveller universe without having to purchase several of the supplements. For those who already have Traveller in one of its incarnations, it is almost worth buying again. The adventure material and the separate charts booklet have proven very useful to me; I was not sorry to have bought Traveller again (for the fourth time!)."

== See also ==
Classic Traveller rule sets
