= Traveller Double Adventure 3: Death Station/The Argon Gambit =

Science-fiction role-playing game supplement

- Publishers: Game Designers' Workshop
- Publication: 1981
- Genres: Science-fiction
- Systems: Classic Traveller

Traveller Double Adventure 3: Death Station/The Argon Gambit contains a pair of tabletop role-playing game adventures for Traveller, published in tête-bêche format by Game Designers' Workshop (GDW) in 1981.

== Contents ==
Two separate Traveller adventures set in the Harlequin subsector of the Solomani Rim are packaged together:

- In The Argon Gambit, the adventurers are stranded on the planet Janosz, unable to pay for needed spaceship repairs. They agree to perform a simple burglary that turns out to be not simple at all. Extra material in the adventure includes information about the Solomani political and military system.
- In Death Station, a research station orbiting around the planet Gadden has fallen silent, and the adventurers are sent to discover why. Extra material in the adventure includes nine pages of information about a standard 400-ton lab ship as well as detailed blueprints.

In both adventures, the referee can either use pregenerated characters, or allow the players to create their own characters.

== Reception ==
In the August 1981 edition of The Space Gamer (Issue No. 42), William A. Barton liked the two adventures, saying, "Argon Gambit/Death Station is well worth the devoted Traveller ref's attention. Both scenarios demonstrate GDW's usual standards of quality and add even greater depth to the richness of the Traveller universe - in addition to being good adventures. Recommended."

Tony Watson reviewed The Argon Gambit/Death Station for Different Worlds magazine and stated that "I found this double adventure very interesting. The adventures are challenging, intriguing and original. The background material included should prove useful beyond the scope of the situations presented in the book. Another nice job by the crew at GDW."

In the December 1981 edition of Dragon, Bill Fawcett liked the fact that both adventures required an emphasis on sharp thinking and investigation rather than combat. He recommended the package, saying, "Both adventures are well balanced between action and the need to think your way out of a situation. Both have mysteries to solve and include more than adequate clues. The settings are colorful and well detailed and are entirely consistent with other adventures available from GDW. Both should be enjoyable challenges for Traveller players."

In his 1990 book The Complete Guide to Role-Playing Games, game critic Rick Swan highly recommended this as one of the best Traveller publications.

== See also ==
- Classic Traveller Double Adventures
