= Anomalies (Traveller) =

Science-fiction role-playing game supplement

- Cover art by Chris Foss
- Designers: Marc Miller
- Publishers: Imperium Games
- Publication: 1997; 29 years ago
- Genres: Science fiction
- Systems: 2D6

Anomalies is 1997 anthology of nine adventures published under license by Imperium Games for Marc Miller's Traveller, the fourth edition of Game Designers Workshop's science fiction role-playing game Traveller.

== Description ==
Anomlaies is a 112-page softcover book, with design by Marc Miller, editing by Tony Lee and cover art by Chris Foss.

== Plot summary ==
Anomalies includes nine loosely linked adventures that use the Traveller universe and rules system, including:

- "Lock and Loot": the players try to prevent a renegade diplomat from enslaving a primitive civilization.
- "The Sleepers" is set in a cryogenics facility, and features followers of a death cult and deadly robots.
- "Dead Space": the players confront a genetic experiment on a deserted research station.

== Reception ==
In the January 1998 edition of Dragon (Issue #243), Rick Swan called the collection "a triumph, one of the best sci-fi anthologies I’ve ever come across. Brilliantly staged, featuring compelling characters and jaw-dropping plot twists, every episode is a winner, and I'd be hard-pressed to pick my favorite." Swan did criticize the maps, which he found "bland"; he called the artwork "so-so"; and he found the "pages of dense text are hard on the eyes." But he concluded by giving the book a top rating of 6 out of 6, saying, "Nitpicks aside, Anomalies is a first-rate effort, absorbing, intelligent roleplaying of the highest caliber."

== See also ==
- Marc Miller's Traveller publications
