= Traveller Double Adventure 2: Mission on Mithril/Across the Bright Face =

Science-fiction role-playing game supplement

Double Adventure 2: Mission on Mithril/Across the Bright Face
- Designers: Marc W. Miller
- Publishers: Game Designers' Workshop
- Publication: 1980; 46 years ago
- Genres: Science-fiction
- Systems: Classic Traveller

Traveller Double Adventure 2: Mission on Mithril/Across the Bright Face is two tabletop role-playing game adventures, written by Marc W. Miller forTraveller, and published in tête-bêche format by Game Designers' Workshop in 1980.

== Contents ==
Two separate Traveller adventures are packaged together:

- Across the Bright Face takes place on the barren airless planet Dinom, where the north pole faces its sun, leaving the northern hemisphere in perpetual daylight ("the bright face"), and the southern hemisphere perpetually dark. The player characters have been hired to escort a mine owner to his holdings on Dinom, but when the mine owner is killed during a workers' revolution, the only way for the characters to get back to their ship and escape from the planet is to cross the bright face on their own. Extra material includes a detailed map of the planet's surface, rules on the use of ATVs, and the effects of the temperature extremes of the bright face (very hot) and the dark face (very cold).
- In Mission on Mithril, the player characters have been contracted to survey the wintry world of Mithril, especially three unknown anomalies. Extra material provided includes a detailed map of the planet's surface, a map of the starport, two animal encounter tables, and rules to determine the weather (or, for referees who don't want to use the weather determination system, a weather table for 141 days is provided).

In both adventures, the referee can either use pregenerated characters, or allow the players to create their own characters.

== Reception ==
In the October 1980 edition of The Space Gamer (Issue No. 32), William A. Barton recommended the two adventures, saying, "Across the Bright Face/Mission on Mithril will prove to be a helpful addition to the collection of any Traveller referee – and player."

Anders Swenson reviewed Across the Bright Face/Mission on Mithril for Different Worlds magazine and stated that "The Double Adventure in particular is self-contained and suffices for evenings when neither referee nor players wish to extend themselves to invent new situations, nor to worry about the consequences of their actions in the subsequent segments of a campaign."

In the March 1981 edition of Dragon (Issue 47), Tony Watson found both adventures should be "useful to any [Traveller] campaign" and especially liked the "information about animals, events, and equipment that should be useful to any continuing campaign." Watson felt these would work either as stand-alone adventures, or as part of an on-going campaign: "Both of the adventures in this book are well-thought out and interesting, and should give the referee and players an interesting session. If the referee does not desire to use the situations provided verbatim, he can certainly modify them to fit into his ongoing campaign."

In the June-July 1981 edition of White Dwarf (Issue #25), Trevor Graver thought Across the Bright Face to be slightly stronger than Mission on Mithril, only because the latter "gives players a lot more time to think and therefore may be a little slower." Graver gave the package of adventures a rating of 10 out of 10, saying, "I'm amazed that such great work could be crammed into 42 pages. I advise everyone to at least look at it."

== See also ==
- Classic Traveller Double Adventures
