= Traveller Alien Module 8: Darrians =

Science-fiction role-playing game supplement

Alien Module 8: Darrians
The Secret of the Star Trigger
- 1987 cover by David Dietrick
- Designers: Marc Miller; Robert Parker; Nancy Parker; Matt Renner
- Publishers: Game Designers' Workshop
- Publication: 1987; 39 years ago
- Genres: Science-fiction
- Systems: Classic Traveller

Traveller Alien Module 8: Darrians is a science-fiction tabletop roleplaying game supplement, written by Marc Miller, Robert Parker, Nancy Parker and Matt Renner, and a cover by David Dietrick. It was published by Game Designers' Workshop (GDW) in 1987 as a 40-page book for the science fiction role-playing game Traveller. It was the eighth supplement dealing with various alien races found in the Traveller universe, and part of the classic Traveller Alien Modules series. A revised edition Alien Module 3: Darrians, by Pete Nash was published in 2010 by Mongoose Publishing.

== Contents ==
Alien Module 8: Darrians deals with the Darrian Confederation, a minor human/Solomani race of the Spinward Marches who once had a technology greater than that of the Imperium. But they now live in much reduced circumstances except for an old and mighty piece of technology called the Star Trigger.

The book details the Darrians in terms of history, politics, lost technology, culture, and physiology. It also presents the adventure scenario, "The Secret of the Star Trigger."

== Reviews ==
In the August 1988 edition of Dragon (Issue 136), Ken Rolston gave the book high praise, saying, "This is highly recommended for Traveller game fans everywhere."

== See also ==
- List of Classic Traveller Alien Modules
