= Traveller Game Screen =

Accessory for science fiction role-playing game Traveller

- Cover art by Chris Foss
- Designers: Marc Miller
- Illustrators: Chris Foss
- Publishers: Imperium Games
- Publication: 1997
- Genres: Science fiction

Traveller Game Screen, also known as Marc Miller's Traveller Game Screen, is an accessory published by Imperium Games in 1997 for the T4 edition of the science-fiction role-playing game Traveller.

== Description ==
Traveller Game Screen, designed for Marc Miller's revived T4 Traveller, four-panel cardstock screen that, on ethe gamemaster's side, has twenty-seven charts for encounters, trade, and starship combat; on the players' side are skills, equipment, and planetary codes. Also included are a cover sheet doubling as player handouts, and an eight-page adventure titled "Memory Alpha" by Marc Miller.

Players' side of game screen

The scenario is set in the Milieu 0 era, and features a double-blind plot involving memory wipes. The player characters meet a client who wants to entrust them with a mission on the condition that they undergo brainwashing at the end. This encounter is the characters' last memory; they awaken aboard their ship, their minds confused. The mission is accomplished, no doubt, but they soon realize that numerous clues suggest a crew member is missing. They must embark on an investigation into their own recent past, searching for a friend they no longer remember, by retracing their steps through interstellar travel across numerous worlds.

== Publication history ==
The science fiction role-playing game Traveller was first released by Game Designers' Workshop (GDW) in 1977, designed by Marc Miller with help from Frank Chadwick, John Harshman, and Loren Wiseman. In 1987, GDW introduced a new timeline story in Megatraveller, which failed to catch on, and tried to recover with Traveller: The New Era. Marc Miller left GDW in 1991, and five years later, purchased the rights to Traveller. Miller created Imperium Games as the publisher and designed a fourth edition (T4). One of the accessories Miller created for T4 was the Traveller Game Screen. The short adventure contained in this package, "Memory Alpha", was later published as a standalone adventure titled Short Adventure 8: Memory Alpha.

== Reception ==
In Issue 20 of the British game magazine Arcane , Jim Swallow called this product "a traditional add-on" and noted that although there was a great deal of information included, tables for personal combat were notably missing. Swallow did not think there was any way to work the included scenario into a campaign, saying, "As a tournament or one-shot adventure, it's fine, but otherwise it's unworkable. The general impression is that the scenario is a bit of an afterthought tacked on to the GM screen pack, and to be honest, any referee worth his salt should be able to come up with something at least as good and probably better - on his own." Swallow concluded by giving the package a very poor rating of only 3 out of 10, calling "For completists only."

Writing for Freelance Traveller, Paul Anuni considered the included adventure "to be a 'hidden gem'; its differences in style from other contemporary adventures make it interesting, and an experienced referee could quite possibly turn it into the core of a campaign."
