= Traveller Supplement 12: Forms and Charts =

Science-fiction role-playing game supplement

Supplement 12: Forms and Charts
- Designers: Marc W. Miller
- Publishers: Game Designers' Workshop
- Publication: 1983; 42 years ago
- Genres: Science fiction
- Systems: Classic Traveller

Traveller Supplement 12: Forms and Charts is a 1983 role-playing game supplement for Traveller published by Game Designers' Workshop. Thirteen Traveller supplements were published. A single collected volume was published by Far Future Enterprises in 2000.

== Contents ==
Forms and Charts is a supplement which compiles forms and charts published in a variety of methods including convention handouts, Journal of the Travellers' Aid Society mailing wrappers, and parts of adventures.

== Reception ==
Frederick Paul Kiesche III reviewed Forms and Charts in The Space Gamer No. 66. Kiesche commented that "I found Forms and Charts to be a well thought-out and prepared Traveller supplement. I especially like the out-front permission to photocopy to our heart's content. This supplement, when carefully used, will add a lot to a referee's Traveller campaign."

Andy Slack reviewed Supplement 12: Forms and Charts for White Dwarf #49, giving it an overall rating of 2 out of 10, and stated that "One of the strong points of Traveller is that the game mechanics are simple enough that complex record sheets are unnecessary, and I for one will stick to my 3" x 5" cards and graph paper. Supplement 12 is pure chrome."

Tony Watson reviewed Forms and Charts for Different Worlds magazine and stated that "While Forms And Charts may have limited use for some Traveller players, the availability of these forms is welcome for those seeking to better organize their campaign."

== See also ==
- Classic Traveller Supplements
