= Invasion: Earth =

Invasion: Earth may refer to:

- Invasion: Earth (TV series), a BBC science fiction series broadcast in 1998
- A science-fiction novel by Harry Harrison
- Invasion: Earth (board game), a science-fiction wargame published by Game Designers' Workshop, set in the Traveller universe
- Invasion Earth (sci fi novel by Don Vodka)
