= Traveller Supplement 13: Veterans =

Science-fiction role-playing game supplement

Supplement 13: Veterans
- Designers: Tim Brown
- Publishers: Game Designers' Workshop
- Publication: 1983; 42 years ago
- Genres: Science-fiction
- Systems: Classic Traveller

Traveller Supplement 13: Veterans is a 1983 tabletop role-playing game supplement, written by Tim Brown for Traveller published by Game Designers' Workshop. Thirteen Traveller supplements were published. A single collected volume was published by Far Future Enterprises in 2000.

== Contents ==
Veterans is a supplement including 234 characters generated using the Mercenary book.

== Reception ==
Andy Slack reviewed Supplement 13: Veterans for White Dwarf #49, giving it an overall rating of 3 out of 10, and stated that "I feel this supplement [...] is pointless; I would rather see one full of predesigned Striker! equipment."

Frederick Paul Kiesche III reviewed Veterans in The Space Gamer No. 68. Kiesche commented that "This supplement will not appeal to every Traveller referee. It does not have the general usefulness of the Library Data supplements, for example. It is (obviously) most useful to those referees who like to run adventures using Mercenary and (to a lesser extent) Striker, or who allow their player characters to use the Mercenary character-generation system. However, I am more than happy to have purchased the supplement. There is nothing duller than sitting around and rolling out a group of characters for an upcoming encounter in a bar or street or wherever. I found GDW's 1001 Characters to be very useful in that respect, and expect to use Veterans in similar situations."

William A. Barton reviewed Veterans for Different Worlds magazine and stated that "If [...] those of you out there who are serious gamers opt to spend money elsewhere, perhaps GDW will get the message and start turning out more creative designs for Traveller again [...] rather than going for an easy dollar, as it could very easily appear to some, with seemingly quickly designed and produced supplements such as this one and the previous Forms And Charts [...] In comparing Veterans to some of GDW's previous designs and recent works by licensees, I can only fervently hope so."

== See also ==
- Classic Traveller Supplements
