= Traveller Adventure 13: Signal GK =

Science-fiction role-playing game supplement

Adventure 13
Signal GK
- Designers: Marc W. Miller
- Publishers: Game Designers' Workshop
- Publication: 1985; 40 years ago
- Genres: Science fiction
- Systems: Classic Traveller

Traveller Adventure 13: Signal GK is a 1985 role-playing game adventure for Traveller, written by Marc W. Miller, and published by Game Designers' Workshop.

== Plot summary ==
Signal GK is an adventure which takes place in the Solomani Rim in which the player characters must help an eccentric researcher who is trying to defect to the Imperium.

== Reception ==
Craig Sheeley reviewed Signal GK in Space Gamer No. 75, writing:

Recommendations? If you don't run adventures in the Solomani Rim and you have the plans from that FASA set, then steer clear of this adventure. If you have a campaign on the Rim, or you'd like the plans for the Liner, then Signal GK is worth the high price. Barely.

== See also ==
- Classic Traveller adventures
