= The Book of Mars: A Combat System =

Role-playing game supplement

The Book of Mars: A Combat System is a 1981 game supplement published by Image Game Company.

== Gameplay ==
The Book of Mars: A Combat System is a combat system that can be used as a set of rules that can be used to supplement combat in role-playing games or miniatures games, or it can be used on its own as a stand-alone combat system.

== Reception ==
William A. Barton reviewed The Book of Mars in The Space Gamer No. 54. Barton commented that "Overall, while not extensive enough to be used as a complete RPG, The Book of Mars should serve quite well as a set of miniature rules or as a supplement for other miniature or RPG systems."

== Reviews ==
- The Complete Guide to Role-Playing Games
