= Traveller Adventure 7: Broadsword =

Science-fiction role-playing game supplement

Traveller Adventure 7
Broadsword
- Designers: Loren K. Wiseman; Marc W. Miller
- Publishers: Game Designers' Workshop
- Publication: 1982; 43 years ago
- Genres: Science fiction
- Systems: Classic Traveller

Traveller Adventure 7: Broadsword is a 1982 role-playing game adventure for Traveller published by Game Designers' Workshop.

== Plot summary ==
Broadsword is an adventure which focuses on the 800-ton Broadsword mercenary cruiser class of ships.

== Publication history ==
Broadsword was written by Loren K. Wiseman and Marc W. Miller. The Broadsword starship section of the book was written by Marc Miller and originally published in Journal of the Travellers' Aid Society, Issue 8 in 1981.

== Reception ==
William A. Barton reviewed Broadsword in The Space Gamer No. 52. Barton commented that "Broadsword should prove an enjoyable Traveller adventure, especially to players who are militarily-inclined."

Tony Watson reviewed Traveller Adventure 7: Broadsword for Different Worlds magazine and stated that "This adventure should certainly appeal to those players who wish to be interstellar mercenaries. The action on Garda-Vilis is interesting in and of itself and provides a good example of how such mercenary tickets can be set up. The large amount of background material included can allow the referee to use this as a springboard for further adventures involving mercenaries aboard the Broadsword."

== Reviews ==
- Polyhedron #75

== See also ==
- Classic Traveller adventures
