= Traveller Adventure 1: The Kinunir =

Science fiction tabletop role-playing game supplement

Adventure 1
The Kinunir
- Designers: Marc W. Miller
- Publishers: Game Designers' Workshop
- Publication: 1979; 47 years ago
- Genres: Science fiction
- Systems: Classic Traveller

Traveller Adventure 1: The Kinunir is a 1979 science fiction tabletop role-playing adventure by Marc W. Miller, published by Game Designers' Workshop. It was the first adventure published for Traveller, winning the H.G. Wells award for Best Roleplaying Adventure of 1979.

== Plot summary ==
Set in the Imperial timeline in 1105, The Kinunir involves a small Imperial warship, which has mysteriously gone missing.

== Reception ==
Forrest Johnson reviewed The Kinunir in The Space Gamer No. 28. Johnson commented that "Could be fun. A prize for referees - but only a very imaginative and painstaking referee will be able to make full use of it. A challenge for any group of players."

Bob McWilliams reviewed The Kinunir for White Dwarf #19, giving it an overall rating of 9 out of 10, and stated that "I refrain from giving this the maximum rating only because GDW may well do even better in future -- recommended without hesitation."

The Kinunir won the Charles S. Roberts Award for Best Roleplaying Adventure of 1979.

== Reviews ==
- Analog Science Fiction and Fact

== See also ==
- Classic Traveller adventures
