= Traveller Adventure 10: Safari Ship =

Science-fiction role-playing game supplement

Traveller Adventure 10
Safari Ship
- Designers: Marc W. Miller
- Publishers: Game Designers' Workshop
- Publication: 1984; 41 years ago
- Genres: Science fiction
- Systems: Classic Traveller

Traveller Adventure 10: Safari Ship is a 1984 role-playing game adventure for Traveller, written by Marc W. Miller, published by Game Designers' Workshop. It is part of the classic Traveller Adventure series.

== Plot summary ==
Safari Ship is an adventure featuring a type K safari ship which was designed to be used on excursion and hunting trips.

== Reception ==
Stephen Nutt reviewed Adventure 10: Safari Ship for Imagine magazine, and stated that "The main strength of this scenario is its twist. What begins as a quite straightforward hunting adventure ends as a novel and unique Traveller experience. Players and referees will find this a pleasing surprise and a worthwhile end, As such Safari Ship really does cut new ground for the Traveller enthusiast."

Tony Watson reviewed Safari Ship in Space Gamer No. 70. Watson commented that "The good points of Safari Ship far outweigh any of its liabilities. The ship information is excellent, as is the section on hunting, making this a must for any scenario where this sort of ship or a hunter appears. The shriekers are an interesting new race. All in all, another solid effort from GDW."

== See also ==
- Classic Traveller adventures
