= Traveller Double Adventure 6: Divine Intervention/Night of Conquest =

Science-fiction role-playing game supplement

Double Adventure 6: Divine Intervention/Night of Conquest
- Double Adventure 6: Divine Intervention published by Game Designers' Workshop in 1982.
- Designers: J. Andrew Keith; William H. Keith; Lawrence Schick
- Publishers: Game Designers' Workshop
- Publication: 1982
- Genres: Science-fiction
- Systems: Classic Traveller

Traveller Double Adventure 6: Divine Intervention/Night of Conquest is two tabletop role-playing game adventures, written by J. Andrew Keith, William H. Keith, and Lawrence Schick for Traveller, and published in tête-bêche format by Game Designers' Workshop in 1982.

== Plot summary ==
Divine Intervention/Night of Conquest is a double adventure in which the player characters must trick the ruler of a religious dictatorship located in the Spinward Marches, and a group of traders are caught up in an attack on a trading planet in the Reavers' Deep Sector.

== Reception ==
William A. Barton reviewed Divine Intervention/Night of Conquest in The Space Gamer No. 59. Barton commented that "both adventures should give referees and players at least one good session of Traveller play each, though Night of Conquest is unquestionably the stronger of the two."

Andy Slack reviewed Night of Conquest/Divine Intervention for White Dwarf #39, giving it an overall rating of 9 out of 10, and stated that "Double Adventure 6 is one (or rather two) of the classic Traveller scenarios."

== See also ==
Classic Traveller Double Adventures
