= The Long Way Home (Traveller) =

The Long Way Home is a 1996 role-playing game adventure published by British Isles Traveller Support for Traveller.

== Contents ==
The Long Way Home is an adventure in which the setting is during Milieu 0, the dawn of the Third Imperium, and presents a flexible adventure-campaign hybrid in which player characters crew the scout ship Lintula Sunrise on a covert reconnaissance mission far beyond Sylean borders. The book includes nine interconnected scenarios, technical schematics of the ship, and stellar data for 50 systems. The supplement delivers multiple campaign entry points for Scout personnel or freelance explorers.

== Publication history ==
The Long Way Home is the inaugural supplement for the revised Traveller system, published by the British Isles Traveller Support (BITS) organization, despite delays from Imperium Games.

== Reception ==
Andy Butcher reviewed The Long Way Home for Arcane magazine, rating it an 8 out of 10 overall, and stated that "This is a promising first release for the new Traveller, and one that bodes well for any future books from BITS. Good stuff."

== Reviews ==
- Valkyrie #13 (1997)
- AAB Proceedings (Issue 36)
