= Traveller Book 7: Merchant Prince =

Science-fiction role-playing game supplement

Book 7: Merchant Prince
- Designers: Marc Miller
- Publishers: Game Designers' Workshop
- Publication: 1985; 41 years ago
- Genres: Science fiction
- Systems: Classic Traveller

Traveller Book 7: Merchant Prince is a supplement published by Game Designers' Workshop (GDW) in 1985 for the science fiction role-playing game Traveller

== Description ==
Merchant Prince is a rulebook that details the merchant character class in four sections. The book begins with some basic information regarding the Merchant service, as well as background on various transport companies ranging from large mega-corporations to one-man operations. A character generation system explains how to create a merchant. The rules for a new system of trade are also included.

== Publication history ==
GDW released Traveller in 1977, and published several supplements to the original rules. An article about merchants was originally published in 1982 in the first supplement, Special Supplement 1, Merchant Prince in the Journal of the Travellers' Aid Society #12, written by J. Andrew Keith. Three years later, Marc Miller expanded the merchant rules, which were then published as Traveller Book 7: Merchant Prince.

== Reception ==
In The Space Gamer No. 76, Tony Watson commented "If your campaign is geared toward merchant characters, this volume is worth looking at. But if you are not particularly interested in brief descriptions of the major trading companies in the GDW universe, already have the new character generation system from the special supplement to JTAS, and are satisfied with the current rules for interstellar trade, Merchant Prince may not be of much use to you. If you are interested in any of these topics, then Book 7 of Traveller is just what you're looking for."

In Issue 21 of the Australian game magazine Breakout!, Paul Camillos noted, "This module has been a long time coming and has made a very welcome entrance into the world of Traveller, nicely rounding off the major types of player characters available in both basic and advanced system generation. The trade rules make this activity more realistic, without sacrificing playability, which is a great improvement over the system presented in the original Traveller rules." Camillos concluded, "I recommend this book because it makes playing merchants interesting and allows for well rounded characters. The book is a welcome addition to my collection of Traveller material and should be welcomed by all Traveller players.

In Different Worlds, Terry McInnes commented, "Merchant Prince is an excellent addition to the Traveller line. The book does an excellent job of showing by colorful examples just how the complex Merchant Prince systems work, a major plus." McInnes concluded, "This book is for the many Traveller players who find much of their enjoyment as merchant characters pursuing the Almighty Credit through voyaging and speculation aboard their Free Traders."

== See also ==
Classic Traveller Books
