= Pete Nash =

Pete Nash may refer to:

- Pete Nash (comics), creator of the British comic strip Striker
- Pete Nash (game designer), role-playing game designer
