= Traveller Adventure 12: Secret of the Ancients =

Science-fiction role-playing game supplement

Adventure 12
Secret of the Ancients
- Designers: Marc W. Miller
- Publishers: Game Designers' Workshop
- Publication: 1984; 41 years ago
- Genres: Science fiction
- Systems: Classic Traveller

Traveller Adventure 12: Secret of the Ancients is a 1984 role-playing game adventure for Traveller, written by Marc W. Miller, published by Game Designers' Workshop.

== Plot summary ==
Secret of the Ancients is an adventure in which the player characters search in the Regina subsector to find evidence a race that died out long ago known as the Ancients.

== Reception ==
Craig Sheeley reviewed Secret of the Ancients in Space Gamer No. 70. Sheeley commented that "Secrets of the Ancients is a good buy if you want either more information on the Ancients or an adventure that plays like a combination of the exploration sequence from the movie Alien and the Quest for the Holy Grail."

Steve Nutt reviewed Adventure 12 for Imagine magazine, and stated that "In conclusion, the module gives good background material, but is unsuitable for a campaign whose base is political intrigue, industrial espionage, etc."

Marcus L. Rowland reviewed Traveller Adventure 12: Secret of the Ancients for White Dwarf #64, giving it an overall rating of 7 out of 10, and stated that "If you're a Traveller completist, or want to find out the 'real' history of the Ancients, this adventure is a must. If you don't use the Ancients it may still be useful, but can't really be run without a lot of preparation."

== See also ==
- Classic Traveller adventures
