= Emperor's Arsenal =

Tabletop science fiction role-playing game supplement

- Publishers: Imperium Games
- Publication: 1997; 29 years ago
- Genres: Science fiction
- Systems: Marc Miller's Traveller

Emperor's Arsenal is a 1997 role-playing game supplement published by Imperium Games for Marc Miller's Traveller.

== Contents ==
Emperor's Arsenal is a supplement in which a comprehensive catalogue of weaponry across technological eras is offered—from primitive tools to futuristic armaments envisioned by the Imperium. Organized chronologically by Tech Level, the book avoids becoming a dry inventory by interspersing chapters with contextual insights into weapon development and usage. The introduction focuses on Imperial procurement, and the book quickly shifts into offering optional rules for weapon malfunctions, environmental effects, and special combat mechanics. It details everything from grenades and smart guns to advanced powered armor known as Battle Dress, which evolves into remote-controlled "Battle Pods."

== Reception ==
Jim Swallow reviewed Emperor's Arsenal for Arcane magazine, rating it a 6 out of 10 overall, and stated that "Equipment lists are never very interesting, but this is at least well-put together, and in some cases actually quite thought-provoking."

== Reviews ==
- Shadis (Issue 37 - Jun 1997)
- AAB Proceedings (Issue 36)

== See also ==
- Marc Miller's Traveller publications
