= Traveller Double Adventure 5: The Chamax Plague/Horde =

Science-fiction role-playing game supplement

- Designers: J. Andrew Keith; William H. Keith Jr.
- Publishers: Game Designers' Workshop
- Publication: 1981
- Genres: Science-fiction
- Systems: Classic Traveller

Traveller Double Adventure 5: The Chamax Plague/Horde is a pair of tabletop role-playing game adventures for Traveller, published in tête-bêche format by Game Designers' Workshop in 1981.

== Description ==
The Chamax Plague / Horde is a game supplement written by brothers Andrew and William Keith containing two role-playing adventures that are thematically connected by a common threat.

In the first adventure, The Chamax Plague, the players' characters are crew members of the free trader Mudshark, which intercepts a derelict space lifeboat owned by a mining company. The Mudshark is asked to travel to the nearby world of Chamax and search for the missing ship and crew. On the planet, the crew of the Mudshark discovers the missing ship and crew, and the cause of the problem: an aggressively warlike alien race called the chamax.

The second adventure, Horde, is set on the low-tech planet Rashev, about a parsec away from Chamax, where the crew is stranded with a cargo of laser weapons while waiting for replacement parts for their broken fusion drive. An alien spaceship lands and disgorges a horde of chamax intent on conquering the planet. The adventure is then broken down into eight military engagements between the chamax and the characters, who are allied with the planetary militia.

The referee can choose to run the two adventure separately, with the players using different characters in each; or the referee can choose to link the two adventures together so that the crew of the Mudshark in the first adventure carries on to Rashev in the second adventure.

== Reception ==
In the May 1982 edition of The Space Gamer (No. 51), William A. Barton gave a thumbs up, saying, "The Chamax Plague/Horde is probably the most exciting of GDW's double adventures yet released. Definitely recommended."

In the September 1982 edition of Dragon (Issue 65), Tony Watson called these adventures "well thought out, intelligent and challenging." Watson "was impressed with the wealth of detail and information included", and concluded, "For Traveller players looking for an exciting and harrowing adventure, The Chamax Plague/Horde seems made to order.

== See also ==
- Classic Traveller Double Adventures
