= Traveller Adventure 8: Prison Planet =

Science-fiction role-playing game supplement

Adventure 8
Prison Planet
- Designers: Erik Wilson; Dave Emigh
- Publishers: Game Designers' Workshop
- Publication: 1982
- Genres: Science-fiction
- Systems: Classic Traveller

Traveller Adventure 8: Prison Planet is an adventure published by Game Designers' Workshop (GDW) in 1982 for the role-playing game Traveller

== Plot summary ==
Prison Planet is an adventure that focuses on the player characters' attempts to get out of prison. It includes 63 pages of maps, descriptions, events, and non-player characters (prisoners, guards, and staff) for running adventures in a prison.

== Publication history ==
GDW published Traveller in 1977 and it immediately became popular. GDW subsequently published many expansions, modules and adventures for it, including Prison Planet, written by Erik Wilson and Dave Emigh, and published by GDW in 1982.

== Reception ==
William A. Barton reviewed Prison Planet in The Space Gamer No. 59. Barton commented that "Overall, Prison Planet is a different and complete enough adventure that all referees should be able to find it useful, even if only used in part."

Andy Slack reviewed Prison Planet for White Dwarf #39, giving it an overall rating of 5 out of 10, and stated that "The referee using this adventure will have to be a good storyteller to make most players enjoy the petty squalor of prison life, and will need to flesh out events and characters more than usual."

Tony Watson reviewed Prison Planet for Different Worlds magazine and stated that "I was very impressed with Prison Planet. Even though the topic is somewhat esoteric [...] it is very well done and contains a surprising amount of detail. It is all there: corrupt guards, bad food, prison gangs and tough guys, and assignments in the danger zone for committing infractions. There is even a system for determining player's prison reputation, based on courage, brawling ability, squealing, and such. All the maps, rumors, and events combined to create the atmosphere of a correctional institution. Certainly recommended for the gamemaster who wants to be prepared for anything. Now let my players get themselves in a situation where the Imperials throw them in prison; I will be ready."

In his 1990 book The Complete Guide to Role-Playing Games, game critic Rick Swan highly recommended this as one of the best Traveller adventures.

== See also ==
- Classic Traveller adventures
