= Traveller Adventure 11: Murder on Arcturus Station =

Science-fiction role-playing game supplement

Adventure 11
Murder on Arcturus Station
- Designers: J. Andrew Keith
- Publishers: Game Designers' Workshop
- Publication: 1983; 42 years ago
- Genres: Science fiction
- Systems: Classic Traveller

Traveller Adventure 11: Murder on Arcturus Station is an adventure published by Game Designers' Workshop (GDW) in 1983 for the science fiction role-playing game Traveller.

== Plot summary ==
Murder on Arcturus Station is an adventure featuring a murder mystery on Arcturus Station Three where any among nine suspects or the player characters may be the murderer.

== Reception ==
E.A. Edwards reviewed Murder on Arcturus Station in Space Gamer No. 68. Edwards commented that "For the science fiction role-players who seek a stirring experience with no danger of losing a valuable playing character, Murder is a must. The collector will purchase this because it's the 11th full adventure in GDW's Traveller series. A team of mercenary adventurers will find this adventure a pleasant respite on their next R&R. Non-Traveller SFRPGers will find Murder very compatible with other systems."

Andy Slack reviewed Traveller Adventure 11: Murder on Arcturus Station for White Dwarf #54, giving it an overall rating of 7 out of 10, and stated that "I suspect most groups will want a fight somewhere in the adventure, which should be a piece of pure detective work really. I found this adventure entertaining, and recommend it to anyone with the time to do it justice."

In his 1990 book The Complete Guide to Role-Playing Games, game critic Rick Swan highly recommended this as one of the best Traveller adventures, calling it "a tense murder mystery."

In a retrospective review of Murder on Arcturus Station in Black Gate, Patrick Kanouse said "Murder on Arcturus Station is an exciting, flexible, and classic adventure that can be run and enjoyed all these decades later, whether using the classic Traveller rules or more modern editions. While requiring a bit more prep work by the referee, the results are worth it."

== See also ==
- Classic Traveller adventures
