= Traveller Double Adventure 4: Marooned/Marooned Alone =

Science-fiction role-playing game supplement

Double Adventure 4: Marooned/Marooned Alone
- Designers: Loren K. Wiseman
- Publishers: Game Designers' Workshop
- Publication: 1981
- Genres: Science-fiction
- Systems: Classic Traveller

Traveller Double Adventure 4: Marooned/Marooned Alone is two tabletop role-playing game adventures, written by Loren K. Wiseman for Traveller, and published in tête-bêche format by Game Designers' Workshop in 1981.

== Plot summary ==
Marooned/Marooned Alone is an adventure in which the player characterss must travel by foot through the wilderness on the planet Pagliacci in the Solomani Rim, dealing with its harsh weather and treacherous landscapes while being pursued.

== Reception ==
William A. Barton reviewed Marooned/Marooned Alone in The Space Gamer No. 46. Barton commented that "if your players haven't tired of planetary journeys after Across the Bright Face/Mission on Mithril and Twilight's Peak, they'll find a welcome challenge in Marooned/Marooned Alone."

Bob McWilliams reviewed Marooned/Marooned Alone for White Dwarf #28, giving it an overall rating of 10 out of 10 for the novice (and 9 for the expert), and stated that "this movement system is a rules addition that has long been required, and should have been in the basic rules set. The adventure is however a good one for novice Traveller players and referees, and is one of the few capable of being played solitaire without advanced schizophrenia being necessary."

== See also ==
Classic Traveller Double Adventures
