= MegaTraveller Referee's Companion =

Tabletop science fiction role-playing game supplement

MegaTraveller
Referee's Companion
- Cover by James Holloway
- Designers: Marc W. Miller; Frank Chadwick; Joe D. Fugate, Sr.; Gary L. Thomas
- Publishers: Game Designers' Workshop
- Publication: 1988; 37 years ago
- Genres: Science fiction
- Systems: 2D6 task based system
- ISBN: 0-943580-71-4

Megatraveller Referee's Companion is a supplement published by Game Designers' Workshop (GDW) in 1988 for the science fiction role-playing game MegaTraveller.

== Contents ==
Megatraveller Referee's Companion contains information about the MegaTraveller universe for the use of the gamemaster, who can then reveal as much or as little to the player characters as desired. The content includes details of four alien races (Aslan, Droyne, Vargr, Zhodani), various mega-corporations, new technology, and robotics. New rules are provided for scientific research done by the player characters, large scale combat and communications.

== Publication history ==
GDW first published the space opera role-playing game Traveller in 1977, and many adventures and supplements followed. Ten years later, in an attempt to revitalize the franchise, GDW revised the rules and published it as MegaTraveller. One of the first supplements to be published was the MegaTraveller Referee's Companion, a 98-page softcover book by Marc W. Miller with contributions by Frank Chadwick, Joe D. Fugate Sr., and Gary L. Thomas, interior art by Rob Caswell, Liz Danforth, Jeff Dee, A.C. Farley, Bryan Gibson, and Tom Peters, cover art by Jim Holloway, and published by GDW in 1988.

== Reception ==
In the inaugural issue of Games International, Jake Thornton noted that much of the material had been previously published in various sources, saying "Very little of this supplement has not been dealt with before in one or other old Traveller related products. If you are upgrading from Traveller to MegaTraveller then look carefully at the old supplements, copies of the Journal of the Travellers Aid Society, etc that you have before you buy." He concluded by giving this book an average rating of 3 out of 5 stars.

In Issue 141 of Dragon (January 1989), Jim Bambra liked the book's "diverse range of topics", and concluded that it was "another fine addition to the MegaTraveller game."

== Other reviews ==
- The Traveller's Digest Issue 16 (p. 37)
- Tidewater Traveller Times Vol. 2, Issue 6 (Nov. 1988, p. 4)

== See also ==
- List of MegaTraveller publications
