= Traveller Supplement 2: Animal Encounters =

Science-fiction role-playing game supplement

- Publishers: Game Designers' Workshop
- Publication: 1979; 46 years ago
- Genres: Science fiction
- Systems: Classic Traveller

Traveller Supplement 2: Animal Encounters is a 1979 role-playing game supplement for Traveller published by Game Designers' Workshop.

== Contents ==
Animal Encounters is a supplement that describes the fauna found on worlds of various sizes and different types of atmosphere.

== Reception ==
Bob McWilliams reviewed Animal Encounters for White Dwarf #15, giving it an overall rating of 9 out of 10, and stated that "the format is simple to use and lucidly explained and indexed in the brief introductory section, and the overall standard is well up to that expected from GDW."

Forrest Johnson reviewed Animal Encounters in The Space Gamer No. 28. Johnson commented that "This is the 'monster book' for Traveller."

== See also ==
Classic Traveller Supplements
