= Traveller Referee Screen =

Science-fiction role-playing game supplement

Traveller Referee Screen is a 1979 role-playing game supplement for Traveller published by Judges Guild, a company which publishes resources for various roleplaying games.

== Contents ==
Traveller Referee Screen is a gamemaster's screen which contains the important tables from Traveller Books 1-4 involving combat, encounters, use of psionic abilities and maneuvers for starships.

Referee Screen is a GM's screen with charts and tables from Traveller plus weapons data from Book 4, Mercenary.

== Publication history ==
Shannon Appelcline explains that the first licenses Judges Guild acquired with a company other than TSR was for the Traveller role-playing game from GDW, and so "Following their original methodology of publishing gaming aids, Judges Guild rapidly put out a referee screen (1978), a character creation aid (1979), and a book of deck plans (1979)".

Referee Screen was published by Judges Guild in 1979 as four cardstock pieces.

== Reception ==
Bob McWilliams reviewed Traveller Referee Screen for White Dwarf #15, giving it an overall rating of 7 out of 10, and stated that "this is a useful though not essential purchase."

William A. Barton reviewed Traveller Referee Screen in The Space Gamer No. 36. Barton commented that "the Traveller Referee Screen will make for smoother play in even the wildest campaign."
