= Traveller Double Adventure 1: Shadows/Annic Nova =

Science-fiction role-playing game supplement

- Designers: Marc W. Miller
- Publishers: Game Designers' Workshop
- Publication: 1980; 45 years ago
- Genres: Science-fiction
- Systems: Classic Traveller

Traveller Double Adventure 1: Shadows/Annic Nova are a pair of tabletop role-playing game adventures for Traveller, by Marc W. Miller, published in tête-bêche format by Game Designers' Workshop in 1980.

== Contents ==
Shadows/Annic Nova is a double adventure presenting two individual scenarios, with each beginning with introductory material including pre-generated characters and equipment. Shadows investigates an alien structure, and Annic Nova investigates a derelict spaceship.

== Reception ==
Tony Watson reviewed Shadows/Annic Nova in The Space Gamer No. 29. Watson commented that "Overall, Shadows/Annic Nova is an interesting supplement for Traveller. The situations it describes should provide the players with a number of intriguing adventures, and even if the settings described aren't used exactly as given, they should provide an enterprising referee with enough ideas to set up a similar game scenario on his own. While Shadows/Annic Nova can easily be omitted from a player's Traveller collection, the dedicated referee will not want to be without it."

== See also ==
Classic Traveller Double Adventures
