= Traveller Supplement 7: Traders and Gunboats =

Science-fiction role-playing game supplement

Traveller Supplement 7, Traders and Gunboats
- Publishers: Game Designers' Workshop
- Publication: 1980; 45 years ago
- Genres: Science fiction
- Systems: Classic Traveller

Traveller Supplement 7: Traders and Gunboats is a role-playing game supplement for Traveller published by Game Designers' Workshop in 1980.

== Contents ==
Traders and Gunboats is a supplement that provides deck plans and describes eight major types of ships and four small craft that are used in the Imperium. It also gives explanations for deck-plan symbology, the strength of bulkheads and walls, and how various portals work. It includes a series of starship encounter tables that provide over sixty possible results.

== Reception ==
In the April 1981 edition of The Space Gamer (Issue No. 38), William A. Barton recommended the supplement, saying, "Traders & Gunboats''s assets far outweigh its few liabilities, making it a work of value to all Travellerites."

In the July 1981 edition of Dragon (Issue 51), Tony Watson concurred, stating, "Once again, GDW has produced an interesting and useful supplement for Traveller that should add considerably to any campaign."

In the October-November 1981 edition of White Dwarf (Issue No. 27), Robert McMahon called the supplement "a useful addition to the Traveller library."

== See also ==
Classic Traveller Supplements
