= Starship Operator's Manual, Volume 1 =

Science-fiction role-playing game supplement

An Illustrated Catalog
- Designers: Joe Fugate; Gary L. Thomas; William W. Connors; Rob Caswell
- Publishers: Digest Group Publications
- Publication: 1988; 38 years ago
- Genres: Science fiction
- Systems: 2D6 based task system

Starship Operator's Manual, Volume 1 is a supplement published by Digest Group Publications (DGP) in 1988 for the science fiction role-playing game MegaTraveller. Starship Operator's Manual published in 2024 by Mongoose Publishing, covers similar content.

== Contents ==
Starship Operator's Manual, Volume 1 is a supplement in which rules are presented for operating a starship. The book details a starship extensively, and includes flowcharts for the gamemaster to adjudicate space travel. Fold-out deck plans for a free-trader starship are also included.

== Publication history ==
Game Designers Workshop (GDW) first published the science fiction role-playing game Traveller in 1977. In 1987, GDW asked DGP for help in designing a major revision to the game called MegaTraveller. After GDW released MegatTraveller, DGP published several adventures and supplements for it under license. One of these was Starship Operator's Manual, Vol. 1, written by Joe Fugate, Gary L. Thomas, William W. Connors, and Rob Caswell. It was published as a 64-page book with foldout deck plans.

Starship Operator's Manual published in 2024 by Mongoose Publishing, covers similar content.

== Reception ==
In Issue 27 of White Wolf (June/July 1991), Keith H. Eisenbeis called this book "a product that truly achieves and surpasses its potential. This supplement explains and illustrates ... starships so well that you might begin to believe that the writers have actually gone on location to the future and taken notes." Eisenbeis concluded by giving this book a rating of 4 out of 5, saying, "Whether a MegaTraveller enthusiast, a veteran Traveller player, or anyone with a imagination interested in starships, the Starship Operator's Manual is an unqualified must have."

In his 1991 book Heroic Worlds, game historian Lawrence Schick noted this book contained, "just about everything you'd want to know about operating a MegaTraveller starship, maneuver and jump drives, flight controls, power, sensors, computers, weapons, etc."

In Issue 1 of Signal-GK, J.Duncan Law-Green used the information in this book to make a rough calculation of the amount of energy supposedly required by a starship's Jump net in order to enter Jumpspace. Law-Green decided to design the drive to be fitted to the external hull of ships, since, "After a thorough reading of Starship Operator's Manual, I have found nothing which says that the means of generating the energy to charge the zuchai crystals has to be inside the Jump net."

=== Other reviews ===
- Terra Traveller Times (Number 19 - Dec 1988)

== See also ==
- List of Digest Group publications for Traveller
- List of Mongoose Traveller publications for Traveller
