= The Atlas of the Imperium =

Science-fiction role-playing game supplement

- Cover by Steve Ventners
- Designers: Marc W. Miller
- Publishers: Game Designers' Workshop
- Publication: 1984; 42 years ago
- Genres: Science-fiction
- Systems: Classic Traveller

The Atlas of the Imperium is a 1984 tabletop role-playing game supplement for Traveller, written by Marc W. Miller, with a cover by Steve Ventners, and published by Game Designers' Workshop. It is a volume of the classic Traveller Modules series.

== Contents ==
The Atlas of the Imperium is a supplement which features a comprehensive star-chart of the Third Imperium as well as the other nearby sections of space.

== Reception ==
Craig Sheeley reviewed The Atlas of the Imperium in Space Gamer No. 73. Sheeley commented "Atlas of the Imperium is a major disappointment. Unless the game stats for the systems presented in this supplement are published, you may as well populate the Imperium yourself and save the money."

Frederick Paul Kiesche III reviewed The Atlas of the Imperium for Different Worlds magazine and stated that "In conclusion, I suggest that you take a careful look at this supplement before you purchase it. If you're looking for Everything You Wanted to Know About the Imperium, this isn't it. But when used as an aid in understanding how the Imperium is put together, or when used in conjunction with other Traveller-oriented products [...] it should be well worth your time and money. If you and your group are tired of knocking around the Spinward Marches or the Solomani Rim, this will give your campaign a lot of new blood!"

== See also ==
- Classic Traveller Modules
