= Nithus =

Science-fiction role-playing game supplement

- Publishers: Group One
- Publication: 1981; 44 years ago
- Genres: Science fiction
- Systems: Classic Traveller

Nithus is a 1981 role-playing game adventure for Traveller published by Group One.

== Plot summary ==
Nithus is a planetary adventure location supplement set on the world of the peace-loving but technologically advanced captutains.

== Publication history ==
Nithus was published in 1981 by Group One as a 16-page book with a large color map.

== Reception ==
William A. Barton reviewed Nithus in The Space Gamer No. 47. Barton commented that "Though not as useful an adventure setting as their earlier Hyrdonauts, Nithus is at least more inspired than the recent Lomodo IVa. If you've liked other G1 products, you'll probably like this one - and if you didn't, you won't."
