= Arrival Vengeance: The Final Odyssey =

Arrival Vengeance: The Final Odyssey is a 1992 role-playing adventure for Traveller published by Game Designers' Workshop.

== Plot summary ==
Arrival Vengeance: The Final Odyssey is an adventure in which the cruiser Arrival Vengeance tours the destroyed Imperium.

== Publication history ==
Shannon Appelcline stated that as Dave Nilsen worked to finish up the MegaTraveller line, "Deciding that a much bigger change was required, GDW gave the old Traveller universe a final send-off with a book called Arrival Vengeance: The Final Odyssey (1992), which depicted a final grand tour of the shattered Imperium. Then Nilsen became work on the new, third edition of Traveller, Traveller: The New Era (1993)."

== Reception ==
Brennan O'Brien reviewed Arrival Vengeance: The Final Odyssey in White Wolf #39 (1994), rating it a 4 out of 5 and stated that "At [the price], you really can't lose with this story supplement. The price tag even compensates for the work necessary to make some scenarios useful."

== See also ==
- List of MegaTraveller publications
