= Invasion: Earth (board game) =

1981 Science fiction tabletop wargame

- Box cover by William H. Keith
- Designers: Frank Chadwick; Marc W. Miller; John M. Astell
- Illustrators: Paul R. Banner
- Publishers: Game Designers' Workshop
- Publication: 1981; 44 years ago
- Genres: Board wargame
- Series: Traveller boardgames

Invasion: Earth The Final Battle of the Solomani Rim War is a 1981 board wargame published by Game Designers' Workshop (GDW). Invasion: Earth is the sixth Traveller boardgame published by GDW, and the first one released in a bookshelf box. It was republished in 2004 as part of Far Future Enterprises Traveller: The Classic Games, Games 1-6+.

== Reception ==
William A. Barton reviewed Invasion: Earth in The Space Gamer No. 48. Barton commented that "Overall, for its merits as a two-player SF board game and for its direct applications to Traveller role-playing, I can recommend Invasion: Earth to all Traveller enthusiasts as well as all those who have enjoyed GDW's other fine SF games."

Andy Slack reviewed Invasion: Earth for White Dwarf #30, giving it an overall rating of 6 out of 10, and stated that "This game feels realistic. Unfortunately, I can't say I enjoyed it."

Tony Watson reviewed Invasion: Earth in Ares #14 and commented that "Invasion: Earth is an interesting, well-balanced game. The situation is tense, requiring some attention to strategy and tactics on both players' parts, and though the ground combat tends to drag a bit at times, the game mechanics are appropriate and well-considered."

== See also ==
Traveller boardgames
