= Traveller Adventure 4: Leviathan =

Science-fiction role-playing game supplement

Traveller Adventure 4
Leviathan
- Designers: Bob McWilliams
- Publishers: Game Designers' Workshop
- Publication: 1979; 46 years ago
- Genres: Science fiction
- Systems: Classic Traveller

Traveller Adventure 4: Leviathan is a 1980 role-playing game adventure for Traveller, written by Bob McWilliams, and published by Game Designers' Workshop.

== Plot summary ==
Leviathan is an adventure that takes place in the Outrim Void, with unknown worlds outside of Imperium space, where the player characters may face pirate corsairs, Zhodani patrols, cartels of rival merchants, and the Imperial Guard Survey Branch of the Imperial Scout Service.

== Reception ==
Trevor Graver reviewed Leviathan for White Dwarf #23, giving it an overall rating of 9 out of 10, and stated that "One of the things I look forward to in each adventure is the library data section which seems to open a new leaf in the mysterious universe of Traveller. And a couple of more pages of library data in Leviathan would have earned it full marks from me. As it is, it's the best adventure yet."

William A. Barton reviewed Leviathan in The Space Gamer No. 38. Barton commented that "Whatever a ref's individual taste, he will surely find Leviathan a worthy addition to the expanding universe of Traveller - and a pretty good adventure to boot."

== See also ==
- Classic Traveller adventures
