= Traveller Adventure 6: Expedition to Zhodane =

Science-fiction role-playing game supplement

Traveller Adventure 6
Expedition to Zhodane
- Publishers: Game Designers' Workshop
- Publication: 1981; 45 years ago
- Genres: Science fiction
- Systems: Classic Traveller

Traveller Adventure 6: Expedition to Zhodane is a 1981 role-playing game adventure for Traveller published by Game Designers' Workshop.

== Plot summary ==
Expedition to Zhodane is an adventure involving an expedition into Zhodani space located within the Chronor subsector of the Spinward Marches.

== Reception ==
William A. Barton reviewed Expedition to Zhodane in The Space Gamer No. 47. Barton commented that "while not as exciting as a situation as, say, Twilight's Peak was, Expedition to Zhodane should prove sufficient for several sessions of intriguing Traveller play."

Tony Watson reviewed Expedition to Zhodane for Different Worlds magazine and stated that "In summation, I would recommend this booklet to the Traveller gamemaster who is looking for a long, fairly complex, adventure to administer over a couple of playing sessions. As usual with GDW products, this is well thought out and interesting."

== Reviews ==
- Adventure Gaming #7

== See also ==
- Classic Traveller adventures
