= Traveller Supplement 4: Citizens of the Imperium =

Science-fiction role-playing game supplement

Traveller Supplement 4, Citizens of the Imperium
- Publishers: Game Designers' Workshop
- Publication: 1979; 46 years ago
- Genres: Science fiction
- Systems: Classic Traveller

Traveller Supplement 4: Citizens of the Imperium is a 1979 role-playing game supplement for Traveller published by Game Designers' Workshop.

== Contents ==
Citizens of the Imperium is a supplement that includes creation tables adding 12 different kinds of character to the game.

== Reception ==
Forrest Johnson reviewed Citizens of the Imperium in The Space Gamer No. 28. Johnson commented that "You will need all of Books 1-5 to fully appreciate this supplement."

Bob McWilliams reviewed Citizens of the Imperium for White Dwarf #20, giving it an overall rating of 8 out of 10, and stated that "I was afraid that Citizens of the Imperium might turn out to be Son of 1001 Characters (Supplement 1) and was therefore pleasantly surprised to find that this booklet is rather more than a straightforward listing of further ready-made characters."

== See also ==
Classic Traveller Supplements
