= Traveller Supplement 10: The Solomani Rim =

Science-fiction role-playing game supplement

The Solomani Rim
- Publishers: Game Designers' Workshop
- Publication: 1982; 43 years ago
- Genres: Science fiction
- Systems: Classic Traveller

Traveller Supplement 10: The Solomani Rim is a 1982 role-playing game supplement for Traveller published by Game Designers' Workshop.

== Contents ==
The Solomani Rim is a supplement focusing on the star sector in a region of space that contains Terra.

== Reception ==
William A. Barton reviewed The Solomani Rim in The Space Gamer No. 56. Barton commented that "Overall, The Solomani Rim should definitely appeal to any Traveller player or ref who has longed to adventure in the area of Terra or who simply wants to know as much about the universe as possible."

Ian R. Beste reviewed The Solomani Rim for Different Worlds magazine and stated that "The Solomani Rim is useful for anyone who plays more or less in the Marc Miller Imperium as presented by GDW. For those who don't, Rim may be useful for inspiration and planetary names. GDW admitted, in Book 0, An Introduction to Traveller, that supplements are there to save time for players and referees. If you need 400 planets, this supplement is a good deal. Otherwise, The Solomani Rim is for dedicated Traveller referees only."

Andy Slack reviewed Traveller Supplement 10: The Solomani Rim for White Dwarf #41, giving it an overall rating of 9 out of 10 for the novice and 2 for the expert, and stated that "I must say, I don't feel it has broken any new ground; and as GDW have said themselves, there are already enough subsector maps around."

== See also ==
- List of Classic Traveller Supplements
- Traveller Alien Module 6: Solomani
