= Scouts & Assassins =

Science-fiction role-playing game supplement

- Designers: Donald P. Rapp
- Publishers: Paranoia Press
- Publication: 1980; 45 years ago
- Genres: Science fiction
- Systems: Classic Traveller

Scouts & Assassins is a 1980 role-playing game supplement for Traveller published by Paranoia Press.

== Contents ==
Scouts & Assassins is a book detailing scout and assassin characters for Traveller.

== Publication history ==
Scouts and Assassins was written by Donald P. Rapp and was published in 1980 by Paranoia Press as a digest-sized 12-page book; a second edition was published in the same year with a red cover, as was a 16-page third edition with a white cover, a map, and a 4-page pamphlet.

== Reception ==
William A. Barton reviewed Scouts & Assassins in The Space Gamer No. 32. Barton commented that "Until GDW publishes their own, if you want an 'official' scout system, Scouts & Assassins is it."

William A. Barton reviewed the 2nd edition of Scouts & Assassins in The Space Gamer No. 41. Barton commented that "Scouts & Assassins, 2nd Edition is a very professional work, worthy to stand alongside GDW's own Traveller materials. Even if you own a copy of the first edition, I recommend the new one; you'll find enough new material to make it well worth the price."
