= Doom of the Singing Star =

Doom of the Singing Star is a 1981 role-playing game adventure published by Judges Guild for Traveller.

== Contents ==
Doom of the Singing Star presents multiple adventure scenarios focused on the massive Brilliant Gem class of armed luxury liners as well as their accompanying module ships.

== Reception ==
William A. Barton reviewed Doom of the Singing Star in The Space Gamer No. 46. Barton commented that "While there are several good points about Doom of the Singing Star, the lack of planning behind the deck plans coupled with the high price of the package make a recommendation difficult. If you don't mind flimsy plans, you may find much of use in this adventure. Otherwise – caveat emptor."

== Reviews ==
- Dark Star (Issue 5 - Oct 1981)
