= Traveller Book 0: An Introduction to Traveller =

Science-fiction role-playing game supplement

Book 0: An Introduction to Traveller
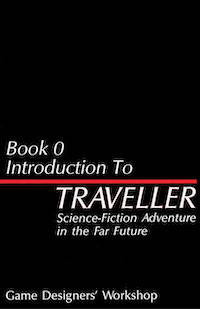
- Designers: Loren K. Wiseman
- Publishers: Game Designers' Workshop
- Publication: 1982; 44 years ago
- Genres: Science-fiction
- Systems: Classic Traveller

Traveller Book 0: An Introduction to Traveller is a tabletop role-playing game supplement, written by Loren K. Wiseman for Traveller, and published by Game Designers' Workshop (GDW) in 1981. The 32-page book acts as an introduction to Traveller, and is designed to be read by those who are new to the hobby of role-playing generally, and particularly to Traveller.

An updated edition written by Gareth Hanrahan, was published by Mongoose Publishing in 2008, and released as part of Free RPG Day.

== Contents ==
It includes basic information on character creation, skills, combat, and equipment. A blank character sheet is also included as a sample.

== Reception ==
In the October 1981 edition of The Space Gamer Issue No. 44), William A. Barton thought the book was a good idea for new players, saying, "If you're new to Traveller, you'll find this book a useful aid. If not, it probably won't be worth your time and money to buy – unless you're a completist."

== See also ==
- Classic Traveller Books
- Mongoose Traveller Books
