= Sapies =

Science-fiction role-playing game supplement

- Designers: Dorothy Bledsaw
- Publishers: Group One
- Publication: 1981; 44 years ago
- Genres: Science fiction
- Systems: Classic Traveller

Sapies is a 1981 role-playing game supplement designed by Dorothy Bledsaw, and published by Group One for Traveller.

== Contents ==
Sapies is an adventure setting on a planet in the Theta Borealis sector, a high-tech world populated by two species at war with each other, the nomadic cygmo and the advanced mitzene.

== Publication history ==
Sapies was published in 1981 by Group One as a 16-page book with a map.

== Reception ==
William A. Barton reviewed Sapies in The Space Gamer No. 48. Barton commented that "Unless you're just completed knocked out by G1's adventure settings and have to have every one published, you can easily find much better than Sapies even among G1's own products."
