= Merchant Class Ships =

Science-fiction role-playing game supplement

- Designers: Ross Babcock; J. Andrew Keith; Jordan Weisman
- Publishers: FASA
- Publication: 1982; 43 years ago
- Genres: Science fiction
- Systems: Classic Traveller

Merchant Class Ships is a 1982 role-playing game supplement for Traveller published by FASA.

== Contents ==
Merchant Class Ships is a set of ship plans depicting the interior details of six classes of 1,000-ton merchant ships.

== Publication history ==
Merchant Class Ships was written by Ross Babcock, J. Andrew Keith, and Jordan Weisman and was published in 1981 by FASA as a boxed set containing a 16-page pamphlet, three large map sheets, and counters; it was published again in 1986 by Seeker as a pamphlet, three large map sheets, and counters.

== Reception ==
William A. Barton reviewed Merchant Class Ships in The Space Gamer No. 58. Barton commented that "For the merchant-minded Traveller, Merchant Class Ships is a worthwhile investment, and, with the minor exception of the box weight, I can give it my highest recommendation."

Bob McWilliams reviewed Merchant Class Ships for White Dwarf #36, giving it an overall rating of 8 out of 10 for the novice, and 7 for the expert, and stated that "the plans themselves and the supporting material show continuing improvement over past efforts from the company."
