= Traveller Supplement 1: 1001 Characters =

Science-fiction role-playing game supplement

- Publishers: Game Designers' Workshop
- Publication: 1978; 47 years ago
- Genres: Science fiction
- Systems: Classic Traveller

Traveller Supplement 1: 1001 Characters is a 1978 role-playing game supplement for Traveller published by Game Designers' Workshop.

== Contents ==
1001 Characters is a supplement which provides a listing of pregenerated characters created from six major categories.

== Reception ==
Don Turnbull reviewed 1001 Characters for White Dwarf #14, giving it an overall rating of 6 out of 10, and stated that "A frustration of Traveller lies in the character-generation system which, if you are unlucky, takes you quite a lot of die-rolling to reveal that the very promising character you are dealing with unfortunately got killed in his final term of service, whereupon you start the whole process again . This booklet allows players to avoid that process, and for this reason alone will be regarded as a valuable asset for those to whom character-generation is merely a tedious pre-requisite to getting down to the game proper."

Forrest Johnson reviewed 1001 Characters in The Space Gamer No. 28. Johnson commented that "This booklet is [...] for players who do not want to take the time to create their own [characters]. It also gives the characteristics of nine famous characters from SF stories, without naming them."

== See also ==
Classic Traveller Supplements
