= SORAG =

Science-fiction role-playing game supplement

Handbook of organization and equipment
- Designers: Chuck Kallenbach II
- Publishers: Paranoia Press
- Publication: 1981; 44 years ago
- Genres: Science fiction
- Systems: Classic Traveller

SORAG is a 1981 role-playing game supplement for Traveller published by Paranoia Press.

== Contents ==
SORAG is a supplement that details the Scientific, Operations, Research and Administration Group (SORAG), an agency which performs both intelligence and counter-intelligence for the Zhodani Consulate. SORAG is a book detailing the organization and function of the espionage agency of the Zhodani, with game rules for characters from the organization including their background, and new skills and equipment.

== Publication history ==
SORAG was written by Chuck Kallenbach II and published in 1981 by Paranoia Press as a 28-page book.

== Reception ==
William A. Barton reviewed SORAG in The Space Gamer No. 43. Barton commented that "Unless the idea of Zhodani intelligence agents waiting around every corner for your hapless characters turns you off, you should find SORAG an intriguing addition to the Traveller mythos."

Tony Watson reviewed SORAG for Different Worlds magazine and stated that "For the campaign that wishes to include spies and their ilk, or the GM who wises to add some new skills and equipment to his game, SORAG is a good choice."

Nelson Cunnington reviewed the supplement for White Dwarf, giving the supplement an overall rating of 9. Cunnington commented that "I feel Sorag is the best thing to come out of Paranoia Press so far, and hard to top [...] I can only recommend Sorag."
