= Encounters in the Phoenix Quadrant =

1980 Science-fiction role-playing game supplement

- Publishers: Group One
- Publication: 1980; 45 years ago
- Genres: Science fiction
- Systems: Classic Traveller

Encounters in the Phoenix Quadrant is a 1980 role-playing game supplement for Traveller published by Group One.

== Contents ==
Encounters in the Phoenix Quadrant is a supplement that details three new types of ship types and their crews: a deep space miner, a Springer freighter, as well as an exploration ship.

== Publication history ==
Encounters in the Phoenix Quadrant was published in 1980 by Group One as a 16-page book. Encounters in the Phoenix Quadrant is a play aid approved for use with Traveller.

== Reception ==
William A. Barton reviewed Encounters in the Phoenix Quadrant in The Space Gamer No. 31. Barton commented that "Overall, the wealth of detailed information on ships and their crews makes Encounters in the Phoenix Quadrant a worthwhile purchase for almost any Traveller player or referee. If, however, you prefer to create your own encounter situations from scratch and have no use for even so much as a frame on which to hang your ideas, you'd be best advised to leave this aid on the shelves."
