= Encounters in the Ventura Quadrant =

Science-fiction role-playing game supplement

- Publishers: Group One
- Publication: 1980; 45 years ago
- Genres: Science fiction
- Systems: Classic Traveller

Encounters in the Ventura Quadrant is a 1980 role-playing game supplement for Traveller published by Group One.

== Contents ==
Encounters in the Ventura Quadrant is a supplement which details additional starships and their crews to be used for Traveller.

== Publication history ==
Encounters in the Ventura Quadrant was published in 1980 by Group One as a 16-page book.

== Reception ==
William A. Barton reviewed Encounters in the Ventura Quadrant in The Space Gamer No. 34. Barton commented that "Group One shows definite promise as an up-and-coming competitor in the field of Traveller play aids. Encounters in the Ventura Quadrant can do nothing but add to your enjoyment in running starship encounters."
