= Vanguard Reaches =

Science-fiction role-playing game supplement

- Designers: Chuck Kallenbach II
- Publishers: Paranoia Press
- Publication: 1981; 44 years ago
- Genres: Science fiction
- Systems: Classic Traveller

Vanguard Reaches is a 1981 role-playing game supplement for Traveller published by Paranoia Press.

== Contents ==
Vanguard Reaches is a book that details 16 new subsectors as well as client states for several empires, and some independent star states.

== Publication history ==
Vanguard Reaches was written by Chuck Kallenbach II and was published in 1981 by Paranoia Press as a 28-page book with a map.

== Reception ==
William A. Barton reviewed Vanguard Reaches in The Space Gamer No. 39. Barton commented that "I highly recommend The Vanguard Reaches to all Travellers looking for new and varied ports of call. Paranoia Press has produced another very professional item in this supplement and has demonstrated itself as a company to keep an eye on in the future for further Traveller-related releases."

== Reviews ==
- Dragon #58 (Feb., 1982)
