= Traveller Book 4: Mercenary =

Science-fiction role-playing game supplement

- Publishers: Game Designers' Workshop
- Publication: 1978; 48 years ago
- Genres: Science-fiction
- Systems: Classic Traveller

Traveller Book 4: Mercenary is a supplement published by Game Designers' Workshop in 1978 for the science fiction role-playing game Traveller .

== Contents ==
Mercenary is the fourth Traveller book, intended as a supplement to the three volumes of the original game. This volume covers how to create a mercenary character for a Traveller campaign, and how the player can try to have the mercenary recruited. The book also updates the Traveller weapons and combat system.

== Reception ==
In the March-April 1979 edition of The Space Gamer (Issue No. 22) Tony Watson recommended Mercenary, saying, "Over all, Mercenary is a good effort, worthy of the game it supplements. Players and referees who have an inclination towards the more martial aspect of the game should be sure and include the book into their campaigns."

In the June 1979 edition of Dragon (Issue 26), Mark Day found the physical quality and layout to be excellent, but questioned why mercenaries could only come from Army or Marines rather than Navy and Scouts. He also questioned why huge plasma rifles were offered in the weapons update, but not simple laser pistols.

In the August-September 1979 edition of White Dwarf (Issue 14), Don Turnbull gave Mercenary 9 out of 10, saying, "If you are into Traveller, this will be a welcome extension to the rules and will add to the already wide scope of them."

In the May-June 1980 edition of The Space Gamer (Issue No. 28) Forrest Johnson recommended Mercenary, saying, "If you would like to spend an evening rolling up some rather interesting characters, you will like this book."

In his 1990 book The Complete Guide to Role-Playing Games, game critic Rick Swan called this one of the best Traveller expansions, and recommended it.

James Maliszewski for Black Gate in 2014 said "Mercenary changed the way we played Traveller forever. Previously, Merchants, Scouts, and Navy personnel were favored, because these careers were all space-based and thus what we considered to be the stuff of sci-fi. But Mercenary-generated characters were so much better than those generated using the original system. They had more (and better) skills, as well as lots of fun perks like advanced training and commendations."

== Reviews ==
- Fantastic Science Fiction v27 n10
- Polyhedron #75

== See also ==
- Classic Traveller Books
