= Nystalux =

Science-fiction role-playing game supplement

- Publishers: Group One
- Publication: 1981; 44 years ago
- Genres: Science fiction
- Systems: Classic Traveller

Nystalux is a 1981 role-playing game adventure for Traveller published by Group One.

== Plot summary ==
Nystalux is the fourth alien world supplement from Group One, describing the planet and its unfriendly insectoid inhabitants the Sedas, as well as its native fauna and the cities of Nystalux.

== Publication history ==
Nithus was published in 1981 by Group One as a 12-page book with a color world map.

== Reception ==
William A. Barton reviewed Nystalux in The Space Gamer No. 41. Barton commented that "Nystalux will probably prove useful to some Traveller referees. Those who are a little short on the cash, or who'd rather create their own cultures from scratch rather than have to alter someone else's, may wish to pass on this one."
