= 101 Vehicles =

Science-fiction role-playing game supplement

An Illustrated Catalog
- Cover by Tim Peters
- Designers: Rob Caswell; William W. Connors; Joe Fugate; Leidner; Nancy Parker; Robert Parker; Tom Peters
- Publishers: Digest Group Publications
- Publication: 1988; 37 years ago
- Genres: Science fiction
- Systems: 2D6 based task system

101 Vehicles is a 1988 role-playing game supplement for MegaTraveller published by Digest Group Publications.

== Contents ==
101 Vehicles is a supplement for MegaTraveller with game statistics and illustrations for 101 military, para-military, and civilian vehicles.

== Publication history ==
101 Vehicles was written by Rob Caswell, William W. Connors, Joe Fugate, Leidner, Nancy Parker, Robert Parker, and Tom Peters, with a cover by Tim Peters, and was published by Digest Group Publications in 1988 as a 48-page book.

== Reception ==
In the January 1989 edition of Dragon (Issue #141), Jim Bambra called the supplement "a handy source of instant vehicles and a good example of the versatility of the design sequence. It is a useful addition to the MegaTraveller game."

== See also ==
List of Digest Group Publications for Traveller
