= The FCI Consumer Guide =

1982 Science-fiction role-playing game supplement

The Freedonian Consumer Institute Product Research Division Consumer Guide, Volume 1
- Designers: Steve Harmon
- Publishers: FASA
- Publication: 1982; 43 years ago
- Genres: Science fiction
- Systems: Classic Traveller

The FCI Consumer Guide is a 1982 role-playing game supplement for Traveller published by FASA.

== Contents ==
The FCI Consumer Guide (short for The Freedonian Consumer Institute Product Research Division Consumer Guide, Volume 1) is a supplement that describes equipment including tools and accessories for weapons, as well as equipment such as life support gear, clothing, communications gear, and vision aids.

== Publication history ==
The FCI Consumer Guide was written by Steve Harmon, and was published in 1982 by FASA as a digest-sized 48-page book.

== Reception ==
William A. Barton reviewed The FCI Consumer Guide in The Space Gamer No. 52. Barton commented that "All in all, The FCI Consumer Guide could prove to be one of the more useful supplements yet published for Traveller."

Bob McWilliams reviewed The FCI Consumer Guide for White Dwarf #36, giving it an overall rating of 9 out of 10 for the novice, and 7 for the expert, and stated that "This booklet collects together a great deal of useful information suitable for any type of Traveller campaign."

Tony Watson reviewed The FCI Consumer Guide for Different Worlds magazine and stated that "Any Traveller group with a little imagination could come up with this equipment and performance parameters as the situations arose. The Guide, though, will save the referee valuable time by providing him with a readily available source of equipment for everyday use."
