= Geptorem =

Science-fiction role-playing game supplement

- Publishers: Group One
- Publication: 1981; 44 years ago
- Genres: Science fiction
- Systems: Classic Traveller

Geptorem is a 1981 role-playing game adventure for Traveller published by Group One.

== Plot summary ==
Geptorem is the fourth Traveller adventure by Group One, and takes place on an alien world.

== Publication history ==
Geptorem was published in 1981 by Group One as a 20-page book with a large color map.

== Reception ==
William A. Barton reviewed Geptorem in The Space Gamer No. 41. Barton commented that "For creative Traveller referees who haven't the time to design their own worlds and cultures from scratch, Geptorem might prove to be of use - even if it is somewhat overpriced. Compared to newer approved-for-Traveller items such as High Passage and the Paranoia Press supplements, however, the Group One adventure delivers less than it should for the price."
