= Hydronaut (adventure) =

Science-fiction role-playing game supplement

- Publishers: Group One
- Publication: 1981; 44 years ago
- Genres: Science fiction
- Systems: Classic Traveller

Hydronaut is a 1981 role-playing game adventure for Traveller published by Group One.

== Plot summary ==
Hydronaut is an adventure scenario taking place under the sea on the planet Dagan.

== Publication history ==
Hydronaut was published in 1981 by Group One as a 48-page book with a large color map.

== Reception ==
William A. Barton reviewed Hydronaut in The Space Gamer No. 46. Barton commented that "if you don't mind fiddling around with some areas and making up your own data to cover what is missing, you might find the idea behind Hydronauts worthy of your attention – especially if you're one of those refs who doesn't always have the time necessary to create your own adventures from scratch. If you haven't liked G1's past efforts, though, you probably won't like this one, either."
