= Theta Borealis Sector =

Science-fiction role-playing game supplement

Theta Borealis Sectors
- Publishers: Group One
- Publication: 1981; 44 years ago
- Genres: Science fiction
- Systems: Classic Traveller

Theta Borealis Sector is a 1981 role-playing game supplement published by Group One for Traveller.

== Contents ==
Theta Borealis Sector is a supplement which explores the worlds and subsectors found in the universe published by Group One for Traveller.

== Publication history ==
Theta Borealis Sector was published in 1981 by Group One as a 16-page book with a large color map.

== Reception ==
William A. Barton reviewed Theta Borealis Sector in The Space Gamer No. 48. Barton commented that "While there's no great reason for most players to leave the sector in which they're currently adventuring for Theta Borealis Sector [...] the product is well-suited for those who'd prefer some distance between themselves and the Imperium. And it does show that Group One is working to improve its products."
