= Mission to Zephor =

Science-fiction role-playing game supplement

- Publishers: Group One
- Publication: 1980; 45 years ago
- Genres: Science fiction
- Systems: Classic Traveller

Mission to Zephor is a 1980 role-playing game adventure for Traveller published by Group One.

== Plot summary ==
Mission to Zephor is the second Group One adventure for Traveller, and involves an interstellar mining mogul whose son has been kidnapped by the armadillo-like Tshini aliens and the mission is to rescue him from a burned-out world.

== Publication history ==
Mission to Zephor was published in 1980 by Group One as a 16-page book with a map.

== Reception ==
William A. Barton reviewed Mission to Zephor in The Space Gamer No. 35. Barton commented that "Mission to Zephor shows definite improvement on the part of Group One in their Traveller adventure development and should provide most players with an exciting and challenging role-playing session."
