= Rescue on Galatea =

Science-fiction role-playing game supplement

- Designers: Mark Lawrence
- Publishers: FASA
- Publication: 1982; 43 years ago
- Genres: Science fiction
- Systems: Classic Traveller

Rescue on Galatea is a 1982 role-playing game adventure for Traveller published by FASA.

== Plot summary ==
Rescue on Galatea is an adventure scenario for mercenary player characters involving an alien world located in the Inverness subsector of the Far Frontiers.

== Publication history ==
Rescue on Galatea was written by Mark Lawrence, and was published in 1982 by FASA as a digest-sized 44-page book with a two-color map. It was illustrated by Mitch O'Connell.

== Reception ==
Tony Watson reviewed Rescue on Galatea for Different Worlds magazine and stated that "My only suggestion is that FASA convince the designer to do another adventure based on some of the ideas, loose ends and characters introduced in Rescue on Galatea. The Church of the Future Man, its security force commander Omnipax, and the soldier Eidolon Chantree are too interesting to allow to fade into nothingness."

William A. Barton reviewed Rescue on Galatea in The Space Gamer No. 58. Barton commented that "Rescue on Galatea has much to recommend it and could be a satisfying adventure if the referee doesn't mind tinkering with it more than is usually necessary with FASA fare. And even so, it is still superior to most items coming out of FASA's competitors in the licensed Traveller field."

Bob McWilliams reviewed Rescue on Galatea for White Dwarf #39, giving it an overall rating of 6 out of 10, and stated that "Rescue on Galatea is an interesting one-off adventure; after the usual 'rescue a patron' briefing common to many Traveller epics, complications set in and the whole thing becomes more enjoyable, set on a rather different world."
