= Traveller Supplement 3: The Spinward Marches =

Science-fiction role-playing game supplement

- Publishers: Game Designers' Workshop
- Publication: 1979; 46 years ago
- Genres: Science fiction
- Systems: Classic Traveller

Traveller Supplement 3: The Spinward Marches is a 1979 role-playing game supplement for Traveller published by Game Designers' Workshop.

== Contents ==
The Spinward Marches includes a description of a region of space and information on its many planets, and maps of the region.

== Reception ==
Forrest Johnson reviewed The Spinward Marches in The Space Gamer No. 28. Johnson commented that "A game master with Book 3 could create a similar region, but this is a time-saver."

Bob McWilliams reviewed The Spinward Marches for White Dwarf #20, giving it an overall rating of 9 out of 10, and stated that "Perhaps the most interesting features are the political and historical snippets in the introduction and heading each set of subsector statistics; they help define the nature of the Imperium and its neighbours in the Marches region of space, and I wish there had been room for more of this background. This is an essential booklet for anyone using Traveller material 'straight'."

== See also ==
Classic Traveller Supplements
