= Star Port Module Number One: The Hotel Complex =

Star Port Module Number One: The Hotel Complex is a 1981 role-playing game supplement published by FASA for Traveller.

== Contents ==
Star Port Module Number One: The Hotel Complex is a supplement in which plans are included as diagrams of different hotel facilities. It features five double-sided floorplan sheets and a 16-page descriptive booklet, all packaged in a shrink-wrapped sleeve. The hotel layout includes ten floors, covering areas like maintenance, transportation, tourist-class rooms, luxury suites, and hidden security areas. Designed for 15mm miniatures, the maps allow player characters to explore the hotel in various settings such as urban, resort, jungle, or spaceport.

This campaign setting supplement provides a detailed overview of a starport hotel, including 15mm-scale floor plans, operational guidelines, and scenario suggestions for gameplay.

== Publication history ==
Star Port Module Number One: The Hotel Complex was written by Jordan Weisman, Ross Babcock, and J. Andrew Keith, with art by William H. Keith Jr. and was published by FASA in 1981 as a boxed set with a digest-sized 16-page pamphlet and give maps.

== Reception ==
Anders Swenson reviewed Star Port Module Number One: The Hotel Complex for Different Worlds magazine and stated that "This hotel is useful for gamers who want a facility which will provide a setting for interior fights and confrontations. There is no way in which Hotel Complex can be described as more than sketchily realistic."

== Reviews ==
- The Imperium Staple (Issue 7 - Sep 1986)
