= Traveller Deluxe Edition =

Science-fiction role-playing game

Traveller Deluxe Edition is a 1981 role-playing game supplement published by Game Designers' Workshop, a boxed set edition for Traveller.

== Contents ==
Traveller Deluxe Edition is a boxed set intended to make Traveller gameplay easier, especially for new or beginning players.

== Reception ==
William A. Barton reviewed Traveller Deluxe Edition in The Space Gamer No. 44. Barton commented that "Deluxe Traveller is an excellent addition to the Traveller line – especially for the new player and referee. And even the old-timer Travellers who want the second edition rules wouldn't go far wrong by going the extra price for the deluxe edition."

Andy Slack reviewed Deluxe Edition Traveller for White Dwarf #27, giving it an overall rating of 10 out of 10 for newcomers (but only a 4 for old hands), and stated that "the basics of characters, combat, ships, trade and worlds remain unchanged. While this edition provides more detail than the basic set, it doesn't supersede it."

Paul Andrew Denisowski reviewed Deluxe Traveller for Pegasus magazine and stated that "Despite its few shortcomings, Deluxe Traveller tm is a superior game, and I recommend it to new and old players alike."

== Reviews ==
- Different Worlds #14 (Sep 1981)
- 1981 Games 100 in Games
