= Traveller Record Sheets =

Science-fiction role-playing game supplement

- Traveller Record Sheets published by Paranoia Press in 1980.
- Publishers: Paranoia Press
- Publication: 1980
- Genres: Science-fiction
- Systems: Classic Traveller

Traveller Record Sheets is a 1980 role-playing game supplement for Traveller published by Paranoia Press.

== Contents ==
Traveller Record Sheets is a line of several approved Traveller products that consisted of pads of record sheets, including Personal Data Sheets, Starship Logs, Ship's Papers/Ship's Design Worksheets, and System Data Sheets.

== Reception ==
William A. Barton reviewed Traveller Record Sheets in The Space Gamer No. 36. Barton commented that "All of these record sheets are well-conceived and quite impressive in appearance and content. They should provide an excellent aid for both Traveller players and referees - especially the Personal Data Sheet."
