= Encounters in the Corelian Quadrant =

Science-fiction role-playing game supplement

- Publishers: Group One
- Publication: 1980; 45 years ago
- Genres: Science fiction
- Systems: Classic Traveller

Encounters in the Corelian Quadrant is a 1980 role-playing game supplement for Traveller published by Group One.

== Contents ==
Encounters in the Corelian Quadrant is a book of starship encounters featuring four new types of starships.

== Publication history ==
Encounters in the Corelian Quadrant was published in 1980 by Group One as a 16-page book.

== Reception ==
William A. Barton reviewed Encounters in the Corelian Quadrant in The Space Gamer No. 35. Barton commented that "Encounters in the Corelian Quadrant can't fail to spice up starship encounters in even the most exciting of your Traveller campaigns."
