= Marinagua! =

Science-fiction role-playing game supplement

Marinagua! is a 1981 role-playing game supplement published by Group One for Traveller.

== Contents ==
Marinagua! is an adventure setting for the Theta Borealis sector.

== Publication history ==
Marinagua! was published in 1981 by Group One as a 32-page book.

== Reception ==
William A. Barton reviewed Marinagua in The Space Gamer No. 49. Barton commented that "Marinagua has little to recommend it over past G1 adventures (and nothing over recent Traveler adventures by other companies). For completists only."
