= Traveller Book 5: High Guard =

Science-fiction role-playing game supplement

Traveller Book 5, High Guard
- Publishers: Game Designers' Workshop
- Publication: 1980; 45 years ago
- Genres: Science fiction
- Systems: Classic Traveller

Traveller Book 5: High Guard is a supplement published by Game Designers' Workshop in 1980 for the science fiction role-playing game Traveller.

== First edition ==
In 1980, Games Designer Workshop published High Guard, the fifth Traveller book. In its 52 pages, it outlines character and skill generation for Space Navy personnel, and details on how to construct large starships of up to a million tons.

=== Reception ===
In the May-June edition of The Space Gamer (Issue No. 28), Forrest Johnson was not a fan, saying, "Unfortunately, the new rules do violence to the system from Book 2 and the laws of physics."

In the August 1980 edition of Dragon (Issue 40), Roberto Camino welcomed the addition of large starships to the Traveller game, but noted a design decision that he called questionable: that the number of minor weapons do not increase at the same rate as the ship's surface area, so larger ships, which should have more firepower, actually have less "punch" than smaller ships. Despite this, Camino believed that the construction system "worked well."

In the August-September 1980 edition of White Dwarf (Issue 20), Bob McWilliams liked both the increase in ship size available, as well as the combat rules for naval fleets.

=== Other first-edition reviews ===
- Fantastic Science Fiction v27 n10

== Second edition ==
In 1981, in response to complaints about errors in the physics underlying the ship-building system, GDW released an updated second edition of High Guard.

=== Reception ===
In the August-September 1981 edition of White Dwarf (Issue 26), Robert McMahon reviewed the revised second edition and gave a thumbs up to the revised ship-building system, but complained, "The only criticism I have of this book is that it had to be brought out at all. In future, I hope GDW will get it right the first time."

In the February 1982 edition of The Space Gamer (Issue No. 48), William A. Barton also reviewed the second edition of High Guard, and liked most of the changes, but noted that some of the original material in the first edition about ship's vehicles had been unnecessarily excised. "While High Guard 2nd Edition still has several faults that GDW should address in the future, it is far superior to the 1st edition in almost every way. I'd advise all you fleet commanders to pick up a copy if you haven't already. But do hang on to your 1st editions for ship's vehicles, etc. You'll be glad you did."

In his 1990 book The Complete Guide to Role-Playing Games, game critic Rick Swan called this one of the best Traveller expansions, and recommended it.
