= Port Xanatath =

Science-fiction role-playing game supplement

- Publishers: Group One
- Publication: 1980; 45 years ago
- Genres: Science fiction
- Systems: Classic Traveller

Port Xanatath is a 1980 role-playing game adventure for Traveller published by Group One.

== Plot summary ==
Port Xanatath is the third adventure in the series of Traveller adventures by Group One, taking place aboard a port that was formerly used as a pirate base by aliens.

== Publication history ==
Port Xanatath was published in 1981 by Group One as a 20-page book with a map.

== Reception ==
William A. Barton reviewed Port Xanatath in The Space Gamer No. 36. Barton commented that "I believe Port Xanatath should prove useful to most Traveller refs - even if only as a source of ideas rather than as an actual adventure. Even those who were less than thrilled with the two earlier adventures might consider giving this one a try."
