= Traveller Supplement 6: 76 Patrons =

Science-fiction role-playing game supplement

Traveller Supplement 6, 76 Patrons
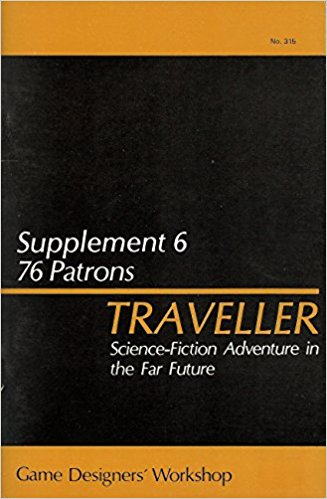
- Publishers: Game Designers' Workshop
- Publication: 1980; 45 years ago
- Genres: Science fiction
- Systems: Classic Traveller

Traveller Supplement 6: 76 Patrons is a 1980 role-playing game supplement for Traveller published by Game Designers' Workshop.

== Contents ==
76 Patrons is a supplement which provides 76 non-player character patrons, each of which can present a mission of various difficulty for the player characters.

== Reception ==
William A. Barton reviewed 76 Patrons in The Space Gamer No. 36. Barton commented that "even if the referee finds it necessary to a lot of tinkering with the scenarios as presented, 76 Patrons should prove a useful addition to the Traveller referee's tools-of-the-trade in creating interesting role-playing encounters."

Anders Swenson reviewed 76 Patrons for Different Worlds magazine and stated that "This is a great little book! It provides a handy guide both for the CM who is still learning how to construct Traveller scenarios, but also for the quick Friday night game where no one wants to thinks a lot. This book as sixty role-playing plots and sixteen mercenary tickets, which should be enough inspiration for anybody. Furthermore, the role-playing scenarios are written in such basic terms that they may easily be applied not only to other science fiction games, but also to adventure games set in other genres."

== Reviews ==
- Polyhedron #75

== See also ==
Classic Traveller Supplements
