= Lomodo IVa =

Science-fiction role-playing game supplement

Lomodo IVa is a 1981 role-playing game supplement for Traveller published by Group One.

== Contents ==
Lomodo IVa is an adventure setting supplement which details the planet Lomoda IVa, where the extinction of two intelligent races left the semi-intelligent jellyfish-like species known as the Osp as the dominant lifeform on the planet.

== Publication history ==
Lomodo IVa was published in 1981 by Group One as a 16-page book with a large color map.

== Reception ==
William A. Barton reviewed Lomodo IVa in The Space Gamer No. 48. Barton commented that "All in all, Lomodo IVa, while having its points of interest, seems the least inspired of any of Group One's adventures thus far. If you haven't thought much of their past products, you'll really hate this one. Unless you're a collector of all Traveller items or are hard up for a place to adventure, pass this one by."
