= Lawrence Whitaker =

Role-playing game designer

- Occupation: Game designer

Lawrence Whitaker is a game designer who has worked primarily on role-playing games.

== Career ==
Lawrence Whitaker had worked on Chaosium fanzines. Whitaker gained experience with the Basic Role-Playing system of RuneQuest while working on the Eternal Champion games from Chaosium in the 1990s. Mongoose Publishing hired Whitaker in 2007, where he wrote their fourth RuneQuest setting, Elric of Melniboné (2007). Whitaker authored many books for Mongoose in their RuneQuest line, particularly throughout their universal, Second Age and Elric lines.

Whitaker and Pete Nash began to revamp the RuneQuest game for Mongoose in 2010, which resulted in RuneQuest II. Whitaker left Mongoose later in 2010 after four years with the company. After Mongoose's license to RuneQuest expired, Mongoose kept the game in print under the title Legend. Meanwhile, Whitaker and Nash formed a company, The Design Mechanism, to pick up the RuneQuest license and publish a sixth edition of the game in 2012. That edition remained in print until 2016, when it was retitled Mythras.

Whitaker has also worked for Alephtar Games.
