= Pete Nash (game designer) =

Role-playing game designer

- Occupation: Game designer

Pete Nash is a game designer who has worked primarily on role-playing games.

== Career ==
Pete Nash had worked on Chaosium fanzines. Mongoose Publishing started to publish game lines in 2008 to support the fourth edition of Dungeons & Dragons by Wizards of the Coast, one of which was Wraith Recon by Nash.

Nash and Lawrence Whitaker worked on updating the RuneQuest role-playing game for Mongoose, which they developed as RuneQuest II in 2010. Nash got new support for his Wraith Recon fantasy warfare setting through supplements for RuneQuest II. After Mongoose's license to RuneQuest expired, Mongoose kept the game in print under the title Legend. Meanwhile, Whitaker and Nash formed a company, The Design Mechanism, to pick up the RuneQuest license and publish a sixth edition of the game in 2012. That edition remained in print until 2016, when it was retitled Mythras.

Nash has also worked for Alephtar Games.
