= John Harshman =

Game designer

- Born: United States
- Occupation: Game designer

John Harshman is a game designer who has worked primarily on role-playing games.

== Career ==
In 1975, Game Designers' Workshop published Triplanetary by Harshman and Marc Miller. Harshman, Frank Chadwick, and Loren Wiseman helped Miller design Traveller and the game was published in 1977. Harshman had been working at GDW directing the development of the Imperium, and when GDW licensed Traveller to other companies, he became the contact within the company for these other publishers.

== Personal life ==
Harshman earned a doctorate in zoology and moved to California.
