= Imperium Games =

Game company

- Founded: 1996
- Founder: Marc Miller
- Defunct: 1998
- Products: Marc Miller's Traveller

Imperium Games was an American game company that produced role-playing games and game supplements.

== History ==
Marc W. Miller partnered with Sweetpea Entertainment to license his science-fiction property Traveller in exchange for funding to get Imperium Games running in February 1996, as a new publisher solely dedicated to Traveller material, beginning with a new, fourth edition of the game titled Marc Miller's Traveller, commonly abbreviated T4. Sweetpea advanced Imperium Games seed money to launch in exchange for equity and media rights.

Lester W. Smith and Timothy Brown, former employees of original Traveller publisher Game Designers' Workshop (GDW), came to work for Imperium Games. Don Perrin also designed role playing products for Traveller. Larry Elmore created most of the black-and-white artwork for Marc Miller's Traveller. Chris Foss created much of the color concept art for the new edition of Traveller, produced 12 pages of artwork for the edition's first supplement, Starships, and illustrated a number of covers for the line.

When Sweetpea Entertainment bought out the stock of the many creators who had worked on T4 and took over some of the day-to-day operations of the company, Timothy Brown took the helm of Imperium Games under Sweetpea's guidance, and was now the only official staff for Imperium, with others acting as freelancers.
