= Dos-à-dos binding =

Type of book binding

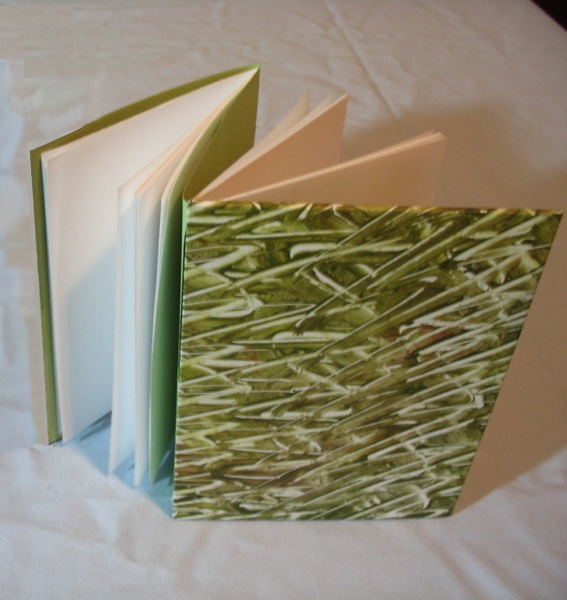
A modern dos-à-dos binding.

In bookbinding, a dos-à-dos binding (/doʊsiːdoʊ/ or /doʊseɪdoʊ/, from the French for "back-to-back") is a binding structure in which two separate books are bound together such that the fore edge of one is adjacent to the spine of the other, with a shared lower board between them serving as the back cover of both. When shelved, the spine of the book to the right faces outward, while the spine of the book to the left faces the back of the shelf; the text of both works runs head-to-tail.

The dos-à-dos format dates back at least to the 16th century, though they were most common in England in the first half of the 17th century. Two books frequently bound in this form were the New Testament and Psalter, which were both needed during church services. Regardless of content, the outer boards of dos-à-dos bindings were usually embroidered, or covered with leather and then finished with gold.

One example is Irvin S. Cobb's Oh! Well! You Know How Women Are! bound dos-à-dos with Mary Roberts Rinehart's Isn't That Just Like a Man!, as published by George Doran in 1920.

== Tête-bêche ==
The term "dos-à-dos" is also used to refer to a single volume in which two texts are bound together, with one text rotated 180° relative to the other, such that when one text runs head-to-tail, the other runs tail-to-head. However, this type of binding is properly termed tête-bêche (/tɛtˈbɛʃ/) (from the French meaning "head-to-toe", literally referring to a type of bed). Books bound in this way have no back cover, but instead have two front covers and a single spine with two titles. When a reader reaches the end of the text of one of the works, the next page is the (upside-down) last page of the other work. These volumes are also referred to as "upside-down books" or "reversible books".

The tête-bêche format has been used for devotional books since the nineteenth century, and possibly earlier.

It has also been used, for example, to bind two-way language dictionaries, and even for novels. An example is The Loving Couple: His (and Her) Story, a 1956 novel by Patrick Dennis, as well as the children's novel Flipped.

The format became widely known in the 1950s, when Ace Books began to publish its Ace Doubles. This was a line of tête-bêche genre paperbacks that ran from 1952 through the early 1970s. The Ace Doubles binding was considered innovative, if gimmicky, at the time; the 18 October 1952 issue of Publishers Weekly describes it as a "trick format".

More recently, the format was used for the 1990 Methuen paperback edition of Monty Python's Flying Circus: Just the Words, a two-volume collection of the scripts of the television series.

The tête-bêche format has found use for bilingual publications, for example in Canada and Ireland. Canada has two official languages which have equal status, French and English, while in Ireland the official languages are Irish and English. The tête-bêche format offers a way of printing a document in both official languages without either being given priority.
