= The Complete Guide to Role-Playing Games =

Book about role-playing games

- Author: Rick Swan
- Cover artist: Phil Foglio
- Published: 1990
- Publisher: St. Martin's Press

The Complete Guide to Role-Playing Games is a book written by Rick Swan and published by St. Martin's Press in 1990 that explains role-playing games and provides reviews of those that were on the market at the time.

== Contents ==
The Complete Guide to Role-Playing Games starts by providing an introduction to the world of role-playing games, including information for the new gamemaster, and information for the new player.

The bulk of the book is given over to reviews of over 150 role-playing games that were available in 1990, in a section titled "The Good, the Bad, and the Awful."

In addition Swan provides a number of "Top 10" lists in an index titled "Recommendations", including his favorite games, the best games for beginners, the best adventures and campaigns, and the best supplements.

Over the next decade, several authors referred readers to this book for more information on how to enter the world of role-playing games.

In his 2014 book Designers & Dragons, game historian Shannon Appelcline acknowledged that he had used Swan's book as a primary source of information for role-playing games of the 1970s and 1980s.

Similarly, in his paper An Analysis of Early 1980s English Language Commercial TRPG Definitions, Jose P. Zagal acknowledged this book as an important source of information about "the most significant games" published between 1980 and 1984.

== Reception ==
In the August 1991 edition of Dragon (Issue #172), Allen Varney called the reviews "fascinating." He concluded, "There’s lots of historical perspective, amusing rules bloopers, and maybe even room for argument, but overall I enthusiastically recommend Swan’s book. So, when’s the next edition?"

In Issue 10 of Wizard, Doris Schwartz called Swan's one-sentence description of role-playing games — "A role-playing game is like an improvised novel in which all the participants serve as authors" — "truly the best description of what goes on in play." Schwartz also noted that Swan had provided "an excellent glossary at the end of the book that will be helpful to the new player."

In her 1998 book Presenting Young Adult Fantasy Fiction, Cathi Dunn MacRae used Swan's book to better explain the structure of a role-playing game to a new player.

Guide du Rôliste Galactique noted "The Complete Guide to Role-Playing Games was intended to be an overview of the role-playing field at the time of its release, before the Internet became widespread. Based on the principle that if finding yourself in the field of role-playing games had been easy at one time, the proliferation of games could make things difficult for newcomers, the author has put together critical presentations of existing games, and of which he was aware at that time."
