= Marc Miller (game designer) =

American game designer

Marc W. Miller
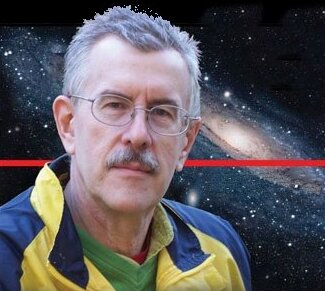
- Miller in 2009
- Born: United States
- Occupations: Game designer; author

Marc William Miller is a wargame and role-playing game designer and author.

== Early career ==
After serving in the U.S. Army, Miller continued his studies at Illinois State University in 1972 under the G.I. Bill. There he joined the ISU Game Club, created by Rich Banner and Frank Chadwick. Banner obtained a grant that funded the printing of blank hex sheets (suitable for making war-game maps). Adding new members Loren K. Wiseman and John Harshman, the ISU Game Club drafted a variety of designs. Some of these designs were derivatives of existing games, and had generic names like Guerre and Swamp. while others were amalgamations, such as Triplanetary.

In 1973, after being convinced by Miller, Chadwick and Banner, Illinois State University created SimRAD (Simulation Research, Analysis, and Design), a college program where students and teachers designed games. Revenue from these games supported the funding of innovations in education. At the same time, Miller, Chadwick, Banner, and Wiseman decided to publish a massive World War II simulation game and created Game Designers' Workshop as their publishing company.

== Game Designers' Workshop ==
Game Designers' Workshop (GDW) was formed on June 22, 1973, and was initially located in Miller and Chadwick's apartment. In that year, GDW published Drang Nach Osten, the first of its Europa Series on World War II.

In 1974 the company published five new titles, including Coral Sea, based on the World War II naval battle.

In 1975, GDW published Triplanetary by Miller and Harshman. Miller designed The Russo-Japanese War and Chaco, which is based on the 1930s war between Bolivia and Paraguay.

In 1977, GDW released Pearl Harbor, a game by John Prados that turned out to have serious issues. Miller was brought in to redevelop the rules, resulting in a much improved second edition released in 1979 that received good critical reception.

Miller, Chadwick, Harshman, and Wiseman designed Traveller, which was published in 1977 by GDW.

Miller designed the science-fiction board game Double Star for GDW, which was released in 1979.

While at GDW, Miller designed a total of 74 games and products, with an average of one every four months, including Imperium; and, co-designed MegaTraveller and 2300 AD.

Miller wrote a letter to the company Digest Group Publications (DGP), in 1987 asking them to help GDW make the large amount of published material for Traveller more accessible, which resulted in the second edition of the game known as MegaTraveller. DGP produced considerable work that went unused, and since 1996, Miller has forbidden his licensees from referencing the unpublished DGP material because of his concerns over copyright issues.

Miller left GDW in 1991.

== After leaving GDW ==
Miller designed the computer game Challenge of the Five Realms which was published and released by MicroProse in 1992 and the card game Super Deck!. In 1996, Miller purchased the rights to Traveller, Twilight: 2000, and 2300 AD, and he formed a new company named Far Future Enterprises. He served as the head of this company, which held the rights to the games. Miller partnered with Sweetpea Entertainment to license media rights for his science-fiction property in exchange for funding to get Imperium Games running in February 1996, as a new publisher dedicated to producing only Traveller material. While Far Future Enterprises licensed Traveller and other games to several companies, Miller worked on a fifth edition of Traveller for Far Future.

Miller also does consultation work for gaming companies. Miller publishes game designs through Far Future Enterprises at farfuture.net, consulting on various aspects of the game industry through his Heartland Publishing Services, primarily design and production issues. His role-playing games are currently in print through Far Future Enterprises, Mongoose Publishing, and Steve Jackson Games.

== Awards and recognition ==
Miller has received the Origins Award, the prestigious Games 100 Award, and the Game Designers' Guild Award. He was inducted into the Charles S. Roberts (Origins) Hall of Fame in 1981 as a designer. He was featured as the king of spades in Flying Buffalo's 2010 Famous Game Designers Playing Card Deck. His novel Agent of the Imperium was nominated for the Dragon Awards in 2016.
