= Byam =

Byam is both a given name and a surname. Notable people with the name include:

- Byam Shaw (1872–1919), Indian-born British painter, illustrator, designer and teacher
- Edward Byam, Governor of the Leeward Islands
- Lydia Byam, (born 1772), botanical illustrator
- Sarah Byam, American comics writer
- Wally Byam (1896–1962), founder of Airstream Inc.

== See also ==
- Byam Channel, a waterway in northern Canada
- Byam (1800 ship), slave ship
- Barrett-Byam, historic house in Chelmsford, Massachusetts
