= Goldtree Engine =

Tabletop role-playing game computer program

Cover of the second edition, 1994

Goldtree Engine is a computer program published by Goldtree Enterprises in 1993 as a play aid for role-playing gamemasters. The second edition of the game was renamed The Goldtree Engine: Kingspoint.

== Description ==
Goldtree Engine is a software program for the IBM PC designed to assist a gamemaster in running tabletop role-playing game adventures in a fantasy urban environment. Using the pre-programmed city Kingspoint, a medieval fantasy city of 150,000, the gamemaster can access the locations and descriptions of random encounters, magic items, buildings, businesses, and neighborhoods. The program can also track game time, create random events, generate changing weather conditions in game time, and provide random dice rolls.

Alternatively, the gamemaster can create their own city and store an index of locations, items, and encounters.

== Publication history ==
Computer programmer Luke Ahearn coded Goldtree Engine for IBM PC and compatible computers, and the program was subsequently published in 1993 by Goldtree Enterprises, based in Metairie. The following year, Goldtree released a second edition of the program retitled The Goldtree Engine: Kingspoint.

== Reception ==
In the September 1994 edition of Dragon (Issue #209), Lester W. Smith was enthusiastic about Goldtree Engine, commenting "The things this program can do are amazing" in a lengthy review about its capabilities. He did point out a number of minor issues: he found the user's guide "less than perfect", he wanted faster access to non-player characters, and he found Kingspoint, the city included with the program, to be an overly dark place. He concluded by giving this program an excellent rating of 5 out of 6, saying, "It does all the dirty work, leaving the GM free to role-play. For city campaigning, there simply is no better GM aid."

In the October 1994 edition of Pyramid (Issue #9), Loyd Blankenship reviewed The Goldtree Engine: Kingspoint under the banner "Pyramid Pick: The Best in Gaming." He noted three different types of gamemasters who could use this game: those that lack the time to design their own city; those that need the gamemaster aids offered by the program; and those that would use the city information to add to their own campaigns when needed. He concluded with a strong recommendation, saying, "Overall, the Kingspoint software is a complete fantasy city ready for your characters, bug-free and fun to use."

James V. Trunzo reviewed The Goldtree Engine: Role Playing Software System in White Wolf Inphobia #53 (March, 1995) and stated that "If you're a GM and you like to do urban gaming, The Goldtree Engine is a must. There's nothing on the market, in print or for the computer, that compares to this unique product."

In the October 1995 issue of Shadis, Wayne Wallace reviewed the Kingspoint For Windows edition of the program and reported, "I am really, really pleased with this product. While the RPG info for the city hasn't changed much, the interface is hugely improved, and is a joy to use." Wallace did find one annoying flaw in the program: "even though you can install it to any directory, the program only looks for certain art, sound, map, etc. files in a single, hard-coded directory. This means that if you want the program anywhere else, another hard drive or another directory, you need to delete the list of pictures and sounds one by one on the Multimedia divider and hope nothing else is needed." Wallace noted that the Windows version of this program might require a computer upgrade, but concluded by saying, "I would not recommend that someone spend $1,000 or $2,000 to get a PC that can run Kingspoint, but if you already have the computer, and most of us gamers do, then Kingspoint is a great bargain. You might find a die-roller here, a character generator there among the various BBSs and the Internet, but Kingspoint is all that and so much more, done at far greater quality."

== Reviews ==
- PC Joker (March 1995)
- Computer Game Review and CD-ROM Entertainment (November 1994)
- Computer Gaming World #125 (December 1994)
