= Castle of Magic (board game) =

Board game

Castle of Magic is a board game that was published by RiddleMaster Games in 1991.

== Description ==
In the world of the Castle of Magic, a monster has invaded Castle Bondi and killed the rulers of three adjoining countries. The players take on the roles of wizards who have come to the castle to try to recover the slain rulers' lost items of power: a bell, a book, and a candle.

The game comes with the following components:

- 8-page rulebook
- 24-page book of player tracking sheets
- 20" x 20" board
- 64 playing cards
- 16 wizard cards
- other cardstock and plastic playing pieces
- two 6-sided dice

== Gameplay ==
=== The board ===
The board has three tracks that players can move around: one represents the outside wall of the castle, one circles the wizard's tower, and one represents the wizard's tower. There are spaces for:

- a 6-step progression track inside the Wizard's Tower for the ritual spell that will end the game
- places for the counters representing the three Items of Power (until each of them is claimed by a player)
- Places for the three countries, indicating which Item of Power controls which country
- three double-ended tracks — one for each ritual element (bell, book, candle) — that lead to one of two conditions for each element. (The bell is either silent or ringing, the book is fully closed or fully open, the candle is either unlit or fully lit.)
- places for eight ritual result markers (Book Open, Book Closed, etc.)

=== Object of game ===
Players move their pawns around the board, gaining spell points that will enable them to:

- learn which Item of Power controls which of the three countries
- control the Item of their choice
- learn which ritual result will be the most advantageous to them
- control the three ritual elements

Players use the Tracking Sheets to keep track of the spell points they've earned, their Combat rating, how many points of control they have over each Item of Power, what Ritual Spell configurations they've discovered, and what secrets they have learned about other players.

Play continues until the Ritual Spell occurs, which can happen in one of two ways:

1. The counter on the countdown track inside the Wizard's Tower reaches the end
2. Markers on the three double-ended Ritual Element tracks all reach either one end of the track or the other

When either of these conditions occurs, the game ends, and the result of the Ritual Spell — one of eight potential results — is revealed.

=== Victory conditions ===
Players gain or lose victory points depending on a number of factors:

1. If a player controls the Monster, if the Monster has been banished or if a player has been eaten by the Monster
2. Who controls which of the three countries, and therefore who controls which of the three Items of Power

The person who accrues the most victory points wins, sharing that victory with any other player who had at least half as many victory points.

However, if the result of the Ritual Spell is that the Monster eats everyone and rampages across the countryside, then everyone loses. (In the Advanced Rules, it is possible for a player to be the Monster, in which case, that player wins the game if this result is revealed.)

== Reception ==
In the January 1993 edition of Dragon (Issue #189), Lester W. Smith found the game components well-made but extremely bland in design. However, he found the game "a lot of fun to play". He did warn that first-time players would be confused for a few turns until they figured out what was going on. Smith concluded, "The Castle of Magic game is not quite like anything I’ve ever played before, and I find it highly entertaining."
