= Demon Dice =

Dice game

Demon Dice, or Daemon Dice, originally published as Chaos Progenitus, is a collectible dice game for two or more players created by Lester Smith (designer of the better-known Dragon Dice) and Tim Brown.

== Publication history ==
The original Chaos Progenitus game released by Destination Games in 1996 was a serious combat game. However, when the game was republished in 2013 as Demon Dice by Fast Forward Games, the idea was given a humorous spin, styling the players as "Demon Creation Specialists, Junior Grade" in the bureaucracy of Hell. In addition, Fast Forward added several promotional "Noble House" demons, one die of which was included in each box of the game's Starter Set or either of its expansions, "A Few Parts More" and "Drippy Are The Damned".

== Gameplay ==
Each player assembles a "demon" from 13 special and collectible six-sided dice, each of the dice representing a different body part of the demon (brain, arms, eyes, legs, lungs) and weapons that the demon is carrying (sword, shield, whip, bellows, trident). All of the dice have icons for plus, minus, hit, move and block. A die's identifying face will have a special ability depending on the body part or item type represented; the other faces will bear damage sources, "blocks" which prevent damage, "plus" icons that make damage harder to block, and "minus" icons which prevent dice from being rolled for a turn.

The players roll for initiative. The first player rolls all his dice against an opposing player's demon. After removing any minuses — these will act against the opponent in the opponent's turn — the active player then matches any remaining dice against his opponent's demon, part for part. Damage inflicted is either "stun" or "wound", with "stuns" healing over time and "wounds" usually being permanent. If a body part is destroyed by wounds, it is removed from the game, and the owning player's total dice that can be rolled on his turn drops by one.

The next player then goes, with the player setting aside one die for each "minus" received from any attacks in the previous turn before rolling his remaining dice. If his demon has no body parts left due to combat damage, or the player is unable to roll any dice due to "minus" dice that have been used against his demon, then that demon dies. The player of the last demon remaining wins the game.

== Reception ==
Andy Butcher reviewed Chaos Progenitus for Arcane magazine, rating it an 8 out of 10 overall, and stated that "With Chaos Progenitus [...] Lester Smith has not only designed a great game, but also proved that the collectable dice format has at least as much potential as the collectable card game."

In the December 1996 edition of Dragon (Issue 236), Rick Swan called the original Chaos Progenitus "a goodie". Swan believed that this game lacked the scope of designer Lester Smith's previous game, Dragon Dice, but found that Chaos Progenitus was "just as addictive. And nearly as collectible."

== Reviews ==
- Magia i Miecz (Issue 43/44 - Jul/Aug 1997) (Polish)
- Pyramid #24 (March/April, 1997)
- Świat Gier Komputerowych #62 (Polish)
- Valkyrie #13 (1997)
