= Dark Conspiracy =

Tabletop role-playing game

- Designers: Lester W. Smith
- Publishers: Game Designers' Workshop
- Publication: 1991; 35 years ago
- Genres: Near-future horror
- Systems: d10

Dark Conspiracy is a near-future horror role-playing game originally written by Lester W. Smith and published by Game Designers' Workshop in 1991. Several editions have been published. In March 2025, Mongoose Publishing acquired the Dark Conspiracy property from its IP owner and have announced plans to release a new trilogy of games starting in 2026.

== Setting ==
Dark Conspiracy is set in the United States of the early 21st century after a "Greater Depression" has destroyed the global economy and left many countries isolated and bankrupt. Many American cities have expanded to form massive metroplexes, in some cases covering entire states. Outside of the metroplexes the majority of the country has become known as "Out-Law" where there is virtually no federal or state protection and the road network joining metroplexes is poorly maintained. Scattered throughout the Out-Law and even in the darker and more forbidding areas of the Metroplexes, zones known as "Demonground" are spawning mysterious "dark minions": monsters armed with deadly weapons. Players typically assume the roles of "Minion Hunters", people who have stumbled across this "Dark Incursion" and have taken up arms against it.

== Publication history ==
=== First edition ===
Game designer Lester Smith created Dark Conspiracy, a dark horror role-playing game set in the near-future, which was published as a 366-page softcover book by GDW using a rules system derived from Twilight: 2000. Seventeen artists contributed artwork, including Larry Elmore (cover art), Earl Geier, Tim Bradstreet, Janet Aulisio and Elizabeth Danforth.

The following year, a trilogy of Dark Conspiracy novels written by Michael Stackpole was released. The first edition also had numerous expansion volumes such as Empathic Sourcebook, Dark Races I, Protodimensions, PC Booster Kit, and Darktek; as well as several adventure modules, and a boardgame.

The first edition was also supported in GDW's own gaming magazine Challenge, and occasionally in several other gaming publications such as Dragon and White Wolf. The UK magazine Role Player Independent also carried several articles about the first edition game.

The first edition uses the same skill-based rule system as Twilight 2000, using a d10 based system for determining success at skill use. Character creation is achieved through a multi-step process in which the player selects various career terms for their character. Each career term specifies either a pre-determined set of skills that the character gained, or allows a certain number of points to be distributed among a set skill list. Each skill is governed by an attribute, either randomly rolled or set using a point distribution method. Each career term also grants the character a fixed number of contacts. As a limit to the number of terms a character can take, each term ages the character four years. Once a certain age limit is reached, the player has to make rolls to prevent the loss of physically oriented attributes due to aging.

The rules also include an expansive illustrated list of equipment for use in the characters' fight, and pictures of many of the items, weapons and vehicles mentioned. Game designer Lester Smith explained, "Some people want lots; others want little... [P]eople that don’t want them can ignore them, but people who do want them will be glad they’re there. It doesn’t work the other way ‘round... As a role-player myself, I want to be able to see what something looks like, if my character is going to be carrying it. I hate picking something for its stats and having no idea of what it looks like."

=== Second edition ===
The Dark Conspiracy product line was discontinued in 1993 due to the declining customer interest. When GDW went out of business in 1995, Dark Conspiracy Enterprises obtained the rights, and later licensed the game to Dynasty Presentations who produced a second edition. This was published in 1997 as two folio-sized volumes, a book for players, and a book for gamemasters. Both books were published as shorter "Basic" editions and long "Master" editions.

=== Third edition ===
Dark Conspiracy Enterprises licensed the game to The Gamers' Conglomerate to publish a third edition. They did not produce the third edition as planned, so in 2010, the option for a third edition was granted to Kinstaff Media. Kinstaff created a division called 3 Hombres Games, which published the PDF of a third edition in 2012 that uses a new rules system with revised character generation and combat rules.

A supplement titled Conspiracy Rules and other material were under development when 3 Hombres Games went out of business.

== Products ==
=== First edition ===
- Dark Conspiracy Core Rulebook

==== Game tools ====
- PC Booster Kit

==== Sourcebooks and scenarios ====
- Among the Dead (Scenario)
- Dark Races #1 Compendium (Sourcebook)
- DarkTek (Sourcebook)
- Empathic Sourcebook (Sourcebook)
- Heart of Darkness (Scenario)
- Hellsgate (Scenario)
- Ice Daemon (Scenario)
- New Orleans (Scenario)
- Nightsider (Scenario)
- Proto-Dimensions Sourcebook #1 (Sourcebook)

==== Board game ====
- Minion Hunter (Core Game)
- Minion Nation (Expansion Set)

==== Novels ====
Michael A. Stackpole wrote three novels, the Fiddleback trilogy, set in the Dark Conspiracy universe that were published by GDW and released alongside the first edition of the game.

- A Gathering Evil
- Evil Ascending
- Evil Triumphant

=== Second edition ===
- Player's Handbook (Basic Edition)
- Player's Handbook (Master Edition)
- Referee's Guide (Basic Edition)
- Referee's Guide (Master Edition)

==== Game tools ====
- Referee's Screen & Adventures (contained the adventures Ice Daemon and Nightsider converted to 2nd Edition rules).

==== Scenarios and sourcebooks ====
- The Shadow Falls (Sin City, Vol 1)
- Of Gates and Gods (Sin City, Vol 2)
- Masks of Darkness (Sin City, Vol 3)

=== Third edition ===
- Conspiracy Rules - The main rulebook. Currently in version 1.1 with any outstanding errata corrected.
- Empathic Guide - A free rules expansion detailing psionics rules and sanity. Largely derived from the original Empathic Sourcebook with new material by Lee Williams and Norm Fenlason, who also provided the interior illustrations.
- Conspiracy Rules Character Sheets - The official and expanded PDF form-fillable and auto-calculating version of the Conspiracy rules character sheets. Designed by Norm Fenlason who also provided the cover design.
- Detour - A short adventure by Captain Obvious, art by David Lee Ingersoll.
- Acute Care - A short adventure written by Dave Schuey, art by David Lee Ingersoll.
- This Just In - A short adventure written and illustrated by Norm Fenlason. Originally conceived as the introductory adventure for The Gamers Conglomerate's cancelled edition.
- Tampete - A fan-made city Sourcebook published in 2017.

=== Clockwork publishing proposed material ===
- Core Rulebook
- Referee Screen with introductory scenario
- Equipment sourcebook
- Monsters sourcebook
- Scenario collection
- Empathic powers sourcebook

== Reception ==
Stewart Wieck reviewed Dark Conspiracy in White Wolf #29 (Oct./Nov., 1991), rating it a 3 out of 5 and stated that "I can get game systems out of any new package from any publisher, so it's a game's setting that has to be the item worthy of note. In Dark Conspiracy the setting just seems too thin to work with."

In the November 1991 edition of Dragon (Issue 175), Allen Varney liked the thoroughness of the rules, but thought the horror aspect of the game was unfocussed, dealing as it did with everything from campy 1950s space monsters to the brooding horror of Lovecraftian aliens. "I might legitimately question... how well the rules aid the various kinds of horror." However, Varney concluded that the game had much to offer experienced gamemasters who knew what "flavour" of horror game they wanted to create: "The Dark Conspiracy game targets experienced referees who already know the kinds of horror adventures they want to run. Its long and very complete rules offer much value to players who want a fair shot (or multiple autofire shots) against the monsters. This game is a giant step forward for GDW in size, presentation, and imagination.""

In a 1996 reader poll by Arcane magazine of readers to determine the 50 most popular roleplaying games of all time, Dark Conspiracy was ranked 43rd. Editor Paul Pettengale commented: "Players take on the roles of people who have learnt of the evil forces at work in the world, and are struggling to defeat them. The evil forces have infiltrated what remains of the government and powerful corporations. A great blend of cyberpunk, Call of Cthulhu and conspiracy paranoia."

== Reviews ==
- Shadis #52 (Oct., 1998)
- Casus Belli #65
- Backstab #11
