= Don't Look Back (role-playing game) =

Don't Look Back: Terror is Never Far Behind (DLB) is a supernatural and paranormal horror-themed role-playing game set in modern times that was initially published in 1994 by Mind Ventures. The player characters investigate supernatural and paranormal events for a secret government agency. A more light-hearted second edition was published in 1995. The game received positive reviews in game periodicals including Dragon and Arcane.

== Publication history ==
- The first edition of DLB, designed by Chuck McGrew, was published by Mind Ventures in 1994 as a 158-page book. The book included rules and two sample adventures.
- A second edition was published in 1995 as a 208-page softcover book. The horror theme was given a more light-hearted tone.
- A 96-page supplement which included additional source material and an adventure called Giant Psychic Insects from Outer Space was also published in 1995.

== Gameplay ==
=== First edition ===
Don't Look Back is set in a world full of conspiracies and unexplained phenomena.

Players take on the roles of agents working for a secret government agency investigating supernatural and paranormal events. Players begin by creating a character with six abilities and about ten skills. Each of a character's abilities and skills has a rating from +5 to -5, with 0 representing an average ability or skill.

Skill checks are done by rolling at least three six-sided dice, with a roll of 11–18 always a success, and a roll of 10 or less always a failure. The total number of dice the player throws is calculated as 3 plus the absolute value of the sum of bonuses or penalties from the most relevant ability, most relevant skill, and the difficulty of the task. If the Base Total of those three factors is above zero, the player totals the three highest dice. If the Base Total is negative, then the player uses the result of the lowest three dice. For example, two characters want to scale a wall that has a difficulty of -2:

- The first character has a -1 Fitness ability and +5 Climbing skill. These combined with the wall's difficulty of -2 gives a Base Total of +2. The absolute value of 2 is added to 3 resulting in a total number of dice to be thrown of 5. Because the Base Total of ability + skill + difficulty was above zero, the player would use the result of the three highest dice to determine success or failure.
- The second character has a +1 Fitness ability and +0 Climbing skill. These combined with the wall's difficulty of -2 gives a Base Total of -1. The absolute value of 1 is added to 3 resulting in a total number of dice to be thrown of 4. Because the Base Total of ability + skill + difficulty was below zero, the player would use the result of the three lowest dice.

The same single roll system is used in combat. An attacker determines how many dice to throw; if successful, the number of points of damage is calculated as the dice total minus 10, the sum then multiplied by the weapon's damage modifier and any resistance modifier of the defender.

=== Second edition ===
In the second edition, a more light-hearted approach is taken to the horror theme. Characters are now ordinary citizens who are pulled into investigating unusual events by circumstances.

Characters have seven abilities, with ratings from +4 to -4. Depending on the character's background, the character also receives a number of acquired abilities. The player can spend a fixed number of points on either improving abilities or acquiring additional abilities. The player can also spend points on buying Advantages such as Ambidexterity; and receive a refund of points for buying Disadvantages such as Gullible. There is no limit to the number of Advantages and Disadvantages that can be purchased, as long as the total expenditure of points is zero.

The skill check resolution system is identical to the first edition except that the final result of the dice roll is checked against a Quality Table to resolve the attempt, which can be anything from Horrible Failure to Incredible Success. The gamemaster then adjudicates what happens as a result.

The combat system uses the same single dice roll system to determine success or failure; resultant damage is calculated by multiplying the action's Quality Rating with the relevant Defense Scale factor. The result is rounded down, resulting in the amount of damage applied.

== Reception ==
In the August 1995 edition of Dragon (Issue 220), Lester Smith thought the character generation system of the first edition was "quick and simple", action checks "easy to adjudicate", and "the adventures were truly spooky." But Smith thought the artwork was "sophomoric." He concluded on a positive note by giving the game an above average rating of 5 out of 6, saying, "Overall, this is an applaudable first product by a new company."

Paul Pettengale reviewed the 2nd edition of Don't Look Back: Terror is Never Far Behind for Arcane magazine, rating it an 8 out of 10 overall. Pettengale comments that "I think Don't Look Back is a superb RPG. The subject matter offers flexibility in terms of gaming style (ranging from dark and brooding through vaguely sinister to downright farcical), and the implementation of the system is a breeze."

In the June 1996 edition of Dragon (Issue 230), Rick Swan thought the second edition was "not only pretty good, but pretty easy. And pretty funny." Swan liked the fast-paced skill resolution system, but found the math-oriented combat system incompatible with the general tenor of the game. "Though it generates acceptable results, a less math-heavy system would’ve been a better fit with a game this goofy." Swan didn't think there was enough new material for owners of the first edition to buy the second edition, but gave it a rating of 4 out of 6 and recommended it for new players, saying, "Don’t Look Back may not be a groundbreaker, but it’s fast-paced, clever, and loaded with goodies."

In a 1996 reader poll conducted by Arcane to determine the 50 most popular roleplaying games of all time, Don't Look Back was ranked 42nd. Editor Paul Pettengale commented: "This was, until the release of Conspiracy X earlier this year, the best of the modern day horror/conspiracy systems. The actual mechanics are a tad clunky, but the world background and the way that the authors set the scene means that no ref can fail but to come up with dozens of classic campaign adventures."

== Reviews ==
- Australian Realms #24
