= Black Canary (comic book) =

American comic book series

- Cover of Black Canary Vol. 1 #1 (November 1991), art by Dick Giordano

Publication information
- Publisher: DC Comics
- Genre: Superhero
- Publication date: (vol. 1); November 1991 – February 1992 (vol. 2); January 1993 – December 1993 (vol. 3); Early September 2007 – Late October 2007 (vol. 4); August 2015 – August 2016
- No. of issues: (vol.1); 4 (vol.2); 12 (vol.3); 4 (vol. 4); 12

Creative team
- Written by: List: (vol. 1 & 2) Sarah Byam (vol. 3) Tony Bedard (vol. 4) Brenden Fletcher
- Artist: List: (vol. 1) Trevor Von Eeden, Dick Giordano (vol. 2) Trevor Von Eeden (vol. 3) Paulo Siqueira (vol. 4) Annie Wu

Black Canary is the name of several comic book titles featuring the character Black Canary and published by DC Comics. Black Canary first appeared in Flash Comics #86 as a guest hero/villain for character Johnny Thunder appearing for five issues until gaining her own feature starting with issue #92 through the series' end in #104.

== Starman and Black Canary ==
Black Canary headlined two issues of The Brave and the Bold with Starman in a trial run from issues #61 and #62 that did not lead to a series.

== Unpublished 1984 miniseries ==
A miniseries by writer Greg Weisman and artist Mike Sekowsky was planned in 1984. The first issue of the series was pencilled, but the project was ultimately shelved due to the character being used in writer/artist Mike Grell's high-profile Green Arrow: The Longbow Hunters series. Elements from the ill-fated project were used for Weisman's DC Showcase: Green Arrow short film.

== Volumes ==
Volume 1 of Black Canary (November 1991 – February 1992) was a four–issue miniseries written by Sarah Byam and drawn by Trevor Von Eeden with inking by Dick Giordano.

After the success of the miniseries Byam and Von Eeden returned for a monthly series that ran for 12 issues (January 1993 – December 1993) before its cancellation.

Volume 3 was a four-issue miniseries (early September 2007 – late October 2007) that chronicled Black Canary's adventures with her daughter Sin escaping the clutches of the League of Assassins. The series was written by Tony Bedard with art by Paulo Siqueira. It filled the story gap between Black Canary's appearances in Birds of Prey and Green Arrow.

In February 2015, DC announced a new volume of Black Canary to be starting in June of that year, after the conclusion of Convergence. Written by Brenden Fletcher and illustrated by Annie Wu, Black Canary was one of the first DC titles to be published as part of the DC You initiative. The series was cancelled as of issue #12 (Aug. 2016), when DC rebooted its continuity with Rebirth.

== Collected editions ==
Title	Material collected	ISBN
Archives
Black Canary Archives	Flash Comics #86–104; Comic Cavalcade #25; DC Special #3; Adventure Comics #399, #418–419; The Brave and the Bold #61–62	HC: 1-56389-734-2
Black Canary limited series and Green Arrow/Black Canary
Green Arrow/Black Canary: Road to the Altar	Birds of Prey #109; Black Canary #1–4; Black Canary Wedding Planner	SC: 978-1-4012-1863-8
Green Arrow/Black Canary: The Wedding Album	Green Arrow/Black Canary #1–5; Green Arrow/Black Canary Wedding Special	HC: 978-1-4012-1841-6; SC: 978-1-4012-2219-2
Green Arrow/Black Canary: Family Business	Green Arrow/Black Canary #6–10	SC: 978-1-4012-2016-7
Green Arrow/Black Canary: A League of Their Own	Green Arrow/Black Canary #11–14; Green Arrow Secret Files #1	SC: 978-1-4012-2250-5
Green Arrow/Black Canary: Enemies List	Green Arrow/Black Canary #15–20	SC: 978-1-4012-2498-1
Green Arrow/Black Canary: Big Game	Green Arrow/Black Canary #21–26	SC: 978-1-4012-2709-8
Green Arrow/Black Canary: Five Stages	Green Arrow/Black Canary #27–30	SC: 978-1-4012-2898-9
