= Minion Hunter =

Board game

- Players: 1 to 6
- Setup time: 5 - 10 minutes
- Playing time: 45 - 90 minutes
- Chance: Medium
- Skills: Cooperative gaming

Minion Hunter is a board game published in 1992 by Game Designers' Workshop in conjunction with their Dark Conspiracy role-playing game. The game is designed to encourage the players to work cooperatively to stall or defeat the plans of four Dark Minion races as a primary goal, with individual advancement a secondary objective.

== Description ==
Minion Hunter was designed by Lester W. Smith. The game comes as a boxed set with the following components:

- 20" x 17" map of "Dark America" (taken from the Dark Conspiracy game). Metroplexes are highlighted, as are highways between them. The board also includes: a "Career Track" around the perimeter; a Minion Plot track; a Hospital track; and a Plot Point Track.
- 8-page rulebook
- 72 Plot Cards
- 40 Equipment Cards
- 10 pawns (6 for individual players, one for each of the four Dark Minion races)
- pad of blank character sheets
- a 10-sided die (an unsupplied 6-sided die is also required for play)
- sheets of play money
- a page of Advanced Rules

The overall plot of the game is that four Dark Minion races are busy trying to take over the world. The players must divide their time between building up their personal statistics, which will be needed in combat, and trying to intercept minions before their plots can succeed.

== Gameplay ==
=== Characters ===
Every player starts with 1 point in Combat, Contacts, Stalking, and Empathy. The players begin by moving around the Career Track, trying to land on spaces that will increase their attributes or allow them to buy equipment.

=== Minion plots ===
Each Plot Card in the Plot Deck has a location on its back, and the name and statistics of the minion hatching a plot on its front. The top card on the Plot Deck is placed facedown on the first square of the Plot Card Track, and moves one space after each player turn. If a character leaves the Career Track and travels to the location listed on the Plot Card, the character can interact with the Plot Card, flipping it over to reveal the minion. The character can choose to fight the minion or retreat.

- If the character retreats, the exposed minion continues to travel down the Plot Track.
- If the character fights the minion and defeats it, the minion is removed from the Plot Card Track, and the next Plot Card on the Deck is placed facedown on the first square of the Plot Track. The player who defeated the minion gains a number of Fame points.
- If the character fights the minion and loses, the character's pawn is placed on the Hospital Track. Once the character reaches the end of that Track, it is healed and can return to play.

If a Plot Card (either facedown or as a revealed minion) reaches the end of the Plot Track, the card is flipped face up (if it isn't already); if the revealed minion is one of the four Dark Minion Races, the appropriate Dark Minion pawn is moved an indicated number of squares along the Plot Point Track. That Plot Card is discarded, and a new Plot Card is placed facedown on the first square of the Plot Card Track.

=== Combat ===
When a character confronts a minion and chooses to fight it, the character must use the particular Attribute noted on the minion's card to defeat it. If the player can roll under the minion's listed Attribute score (using a 10-sided die and subtracting their own Attribute score from the die roll), then the minion is defeated. Rolling above the minion's listed Attribute lands the character in hospital.

=== Winning and losing the game ===
If any Dark Minion pawn reaches the end of the Plot Point Track, the game is over and all players lose.

If the players go through the entire Plot Card Deck before a Dark Minion pawn reaches the end of the Plot Point Track, the game is over, and the character with the most Fame points wins the game.

== Expansion pack ==
Shortly after the release of Minion Hunter, GDW released an expansion pack for the game called Minion Nation. This expansion pack included numerous additional cards and new equipment and greatly expanded rules for random encounters while traveling both on the Dark America map and within the proto-dimensions. After the release of Minion Nation, all further boxed sets of Minion Hunter included the expansion set.

== Reception ==
In the December 1992 edition of Dragon (Issue 188), Rick Swan thought the role-playing aspects of the game were too slight to interest role-players, and the rules of the game were too basic to interest board gamers. He also noted that the basic game was stacked against the Dark Minions, saying, "assuming the characters don’t waste a lot of time wandering around the Career Track, the minions are usually doomed. (The advanced rules, which accelerate the minions’ movement along the Plot Track, make the game more of a contest and are highly recommended.)" Despite these problems, Swan thought some gamers might be interested in it: "If you’d like to get a taste of the Dark Conspiracy universe, or if you’re fond of blowing away monsters, the stylish Minion Hunter game won't disappoint."
