= DarkTek Sourcebook =

1991 supplement published by Game Designers' Workshop

DarkTek Sourcebook is a supplement published by Game Designers' Workshop in 1991 for the near-future horror role-playing game Dark Conspiracy.

== Contents ==
DarkTek Sourcebook, written by Charles E. Gannon, with cover art by John Zeleznik, describes new items for a Dark Conspiracy campaign, including the biologic weapons used by the Dark Minions, the constructs used by the ETs, and the advanced technology used by humans.

== Reception ==
In the September 1992 edition of Dragon (Issue #185), Allen Varney thought that this book "shows a shivery imagination that conveys the game’s flavor better than the rulebook did." Varney concluded with a thumbs up, saying, "Put an Obedience Bug (page 16) in your referee’s ear and compel him to get this book."

== Reviews ==
- Casus Belli #69 (May 1992)
