= Giant Psychic Insects from Outer Space =

Giant Psychic Insects from Outer Space is a 1995 role-playing game adventure for Don't Look Back published by Mind Ventures Games.

== Contents ==
Giant Psychic Insects from Outer Space includes source material for the game, a summary of differences between Don't Look Back's 1st and 2nd edition rules, and a set of three connected adventures in which the spaceship of an alien insectoid race that has been experimenting on human subjects in the United States for over a decade has crashed near a remote town.

== Reception ==
In the April 1996 edition of Arcane (Issue 5), Paul Pettengale thought that "it is fun, it gives ample opportunity for future scenarios using the new alien race, and it reflects the feel of the Don't Look Back game well." Pettengale gave the game an average rating of 7 out of 10.

In the June 1996 edition of Dragon (Issue 230), Rick Swan called it "one of the nuttiest and most entertaining SF adventures I've ever played." Swan looked for improvement in certain areas, saying, "chunks of Pyschic Insects could've used more development; many important locations receive no more than a few sentences of skimpy description. And true, the climax could’ve been stronger." But although it "may not be a groundbreaker", Swan gave it as thumbs up and an above average rating of 5 out of 6, saying it was "fast-paced and loaded with goodies".
