= Billi 99 =

Comic Book

- Cover to Billi 99 #1.

Publication information
- Publisher: Dark Horse Comics
- Publication date: 1991 (original), 2002 (reprint)
- No. of issues: 4

Creative team
- Created by: Written by Sarah Byam, Illustrated by Tim Sale

Billi 99 is a four-issue comic book limited series published by Dark Horse Comics in 1991, which was later reprinted in 2002. It was written by Sarah Byam and illustrated by Tim Sale. It is among Tim Sale's earliest published work.

The tag line for Billi 99, as seen in comic ads in Fall 1991, reads, "It's 1999... Do You Know Where Your Civil Rights Are? Billi 99 A Prayer in Four Parts". The story was inspired by Byam's experiences in Detroit in the 1980s, a love of the heroic stories and pessimism over the reactionary political movements of the time.

A second collected edition was recently reprinted and sold in English, Spanish, and Italian; and distributed throughout Europe, the U.S., and Canada.
