= Maria Riddell =

British poet

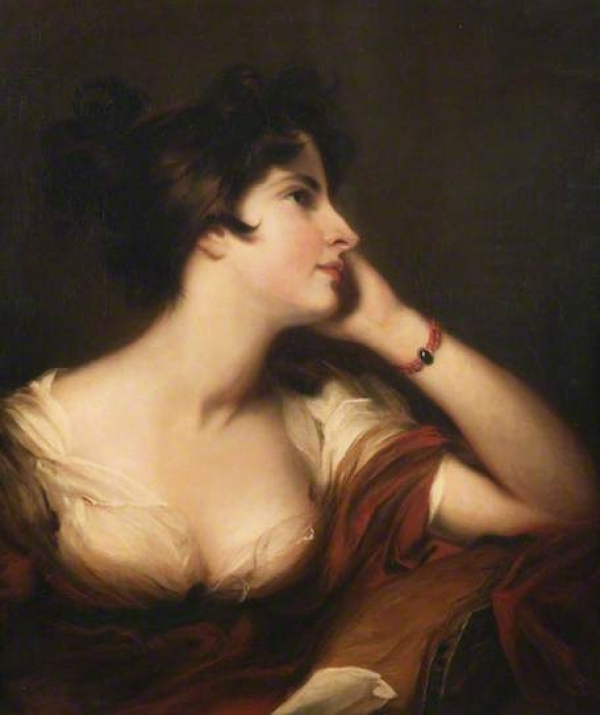
Maria Riddell, portrait c.1806 by Thomas Lawrence

Maria Banks Riddell (née Woodley; 1772–1808) was a West Indies-born poet, anthologist, naturalist, editor and travel writer, who was resident in Scotland and Wales. Robert Burns paid tribute to her as "a votary of the Muses".

Riddel was born Maria Woodley, daughter of a Governor of the Leeward Islands. In 1791, she married her first husband Walter Riddell. The couple settled in an estate in Kirkcudbrightshire, Scotland. Her husband was the brother to a patron of Robert Burns. Burns became a close friend of Maria, and wrote love songs for her. From 1794 to 1795, she and Burns quarrelled over his behavior towards her when drunk.

Following the death of her first husband, Riddell married the Welsh landowner Phillips Lloyd Fletcher. She was buried in a family vault located in Chester.

== Life ==
Maria Woodley was the daughter of William Woodley, Governor of the Leeward Islands for the terms 1768–1771 and 1791–1793). She accompanied him on a visit to the islands in 1788 and wrote an account of it. The book also included a natural history of the Leeward Islands written by her.

In 1791 she married Walter Riddell of Glenriddell, Dumfriesshire, younger brother of Robert Burns's patron Robert Riddell, and the pair set up house at an estate called Woodley Park (now known as Goldielea) in the historical county of Kirkcudbrightshire.

Burns, a guest at literary parties there, became a close friend and critic of Maria Riddell, writing several love songs for her. In early 1794, he made a drunken overture to her sister-in-law, Elizabeth, which resulted in their quarrelling and Burns losing the support of his patron, who died that year. Maria and her husband were reconciled with Burns in 1795, when she sent a poem of appeasement.

When Burns died in 1796, Maria wrote an admired account of him for the Dumfries Journal. She was also a friend of the novelist and poet Helen Craik, another admirer of Burns. She included some poems by Anna Laetitia Barbauld, Georgiana, Duchess of Devonshire and Mary Darwall in her 1802 anthology, The Metrical Miscellany.

Her husband lost Woodley Park and another property and died at the end of the century. Maria Riddell and her two children moved to Hampton Court as pensioners. In 1807, she married a Welsh landowner, Phillips Lloyd Fletcher, and is buried in the Fletcher family vault at Chester.

== Works ==
- Voyage to the Madeira and Leeward and Caribbean Isles, with Sketches of the Natural History of these Islands, Edinburgh, 1792
- The Metrical Miscellany, consisting chiefly of poems hitherto unpublished, 1802 (as editor), 2nd ed., 1803

== See also ==
- Lydia Byam
