= Dark Races, Volume 1 =

1992 Dark Conspiracy game supplement

Dark Races, Volume 1 is a 1992 role-playing supplement for Dark Conspiracy published by Game Designers' Workshop.

== Contents ==
Dark Races, Volume 1 is a supplement in which more than 50 Dark Minions are presented.

== Reception ==
Allen Mixson reviewed Dark Races, Volume 1 in White Wolf #33 (Sept./Oct., 1992), rating it a 4 out of 5 and stated that "Dark Races is not just another monster compendium [...] it's well-produced, neat and has lots of horrible Dark Minions to keep a referee stocked with even more nasties than before. It is a welcome addition to the Dark Conspiracy set of books. I can't wait for another volume."

== Reviews ==
- Abyss Quarterly #50
