= Lydia Byam =

Antigua botanical illustrator

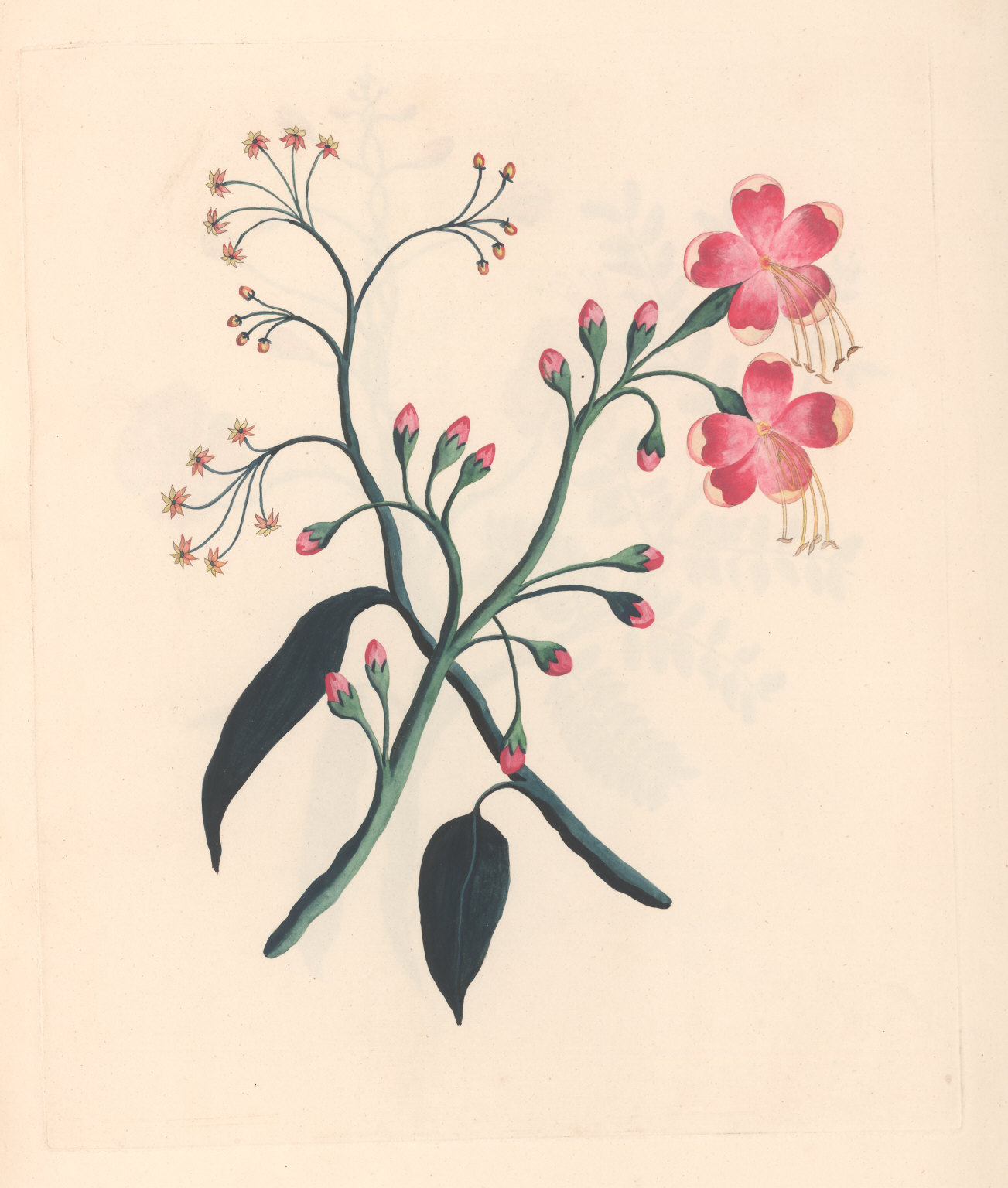
- Byam Bombay gossipium
- Born: Antigua
- Baptised: 4 September 1772
- Died: 28 January 1854 (aged 86); Swanton Morley, Norfolk
- Occupations: Naturalist, scientific illustrator
- Known for: scientific illustration

Lydia Byam Sutton (baptised 1772 – 28 January 1854) was a British botanical illustrator known for her works depicting plants from the Caribbean. Byam's career flourished during the period between 1797 and 1800. She published two works A collection of exotics, from the Island of Antigua (1797) and Fruits of the West Indies (1800) respectively. These are important for the role they played in garnering interest in botany of the Caribbean islands and the dietary and medicinal benefits they offered.

== Early life, family and education ==
Lydia Byam was born to parents William Byam and Martha Rogers (daughter of Edward Rogers). She was baptised on September 4, 1772, in Antigua. Her father was a lawyer and member of the Privy Council in Antigua, who died and was buried in St. Georges, Antigua in 1779. Through her father she was a great granddaughter of Edward Byam (c. 1664-1741), Governor of the Leeward Islands in 1715 and Lieutenant Governor of Antigua from 1715 until his death in 1741. She was related to William Gunthorpe, another Governor of Antigua and her extended family were woven through the rich white slaving owning class of Antigua. Surviving letters indicate that Byam is likely to have been educated in Britain before returning to Antigua.

The Byam family were slaveowners in Antigua. In 1821, Lydia owned an enslaved woman named Jenny, aged 18, and had inherited a further 18 enslaved people purchased by her late father, despite the Slave Trade Act 1807. In 1835, Lydia and her daughter received £1,706 (equivalent to £187,000 in 2025) in slave compensation for the Willis Freeman estate following the abolishment of slavery in the British Empire.

The prominence of the Byam family on the island is clear from the will her father wrote, describing the extensive estate and slaves he owned. William Byam's will, dated March 1773, left his estate in Antigua, real and personal, to the first son Edward Byam, 4,000 pounds (equivalent to £528,000 in 2025) to son Samuel Byam, and 3,000 pounds (equivalent to £396,000 in 2025) to daughter Lydia Byam; his wife Martha was granted the house and lands in Pembrokeshire, which was to be granted to Lydia at her death.

== Personal life ==
Byam married Rev. Robert Sutton in 1801 in London. She died in Swanton Morley, Norfolk, on 28 January 1854, aged 86, where she had settled in 1851 following the death of her husband. Her will left her daughters Ann Hester Freeman Grounds (b. 1807) and Maria Freeman Miles effects under £600. The family maintained a practice of using her maiden name Byam as a family name, including Thomas Byam Grounds (d. 1916) (son of her daughter Ann Hester Freeman Sutton) and her great-grandson Noel Barwick Charles Byam Grounds (d.1956).

== Works ==
It is thought that Byam may have met Henri de Ponthieu (1731-1808) who had to collect specimens for Sir Joseph Banks whilst travelling to the Caribbean in 1786-7.

The plates which illustrate Byam's books were coloured by hand and her written descriptions of Caribbean plants may have been influenced by those of poet Maria Riddell (1772-1808) who met the Byam family whilst in Antigua in 1788.

Byam's books were published anonymously with dedications, including one to her distant relative Elizabeth Monckton-Arundell, Viscountess Galway, the wife of Robert Monckton-Arundell, 4th Viscount Galway, the daughter of Daniel Mathew and Mary Byam.

- A collection of exotics, from the Island of Antigua (1797)
- Fruits of the West Indies (1800)

Her works are held in the collections of Dumbarton Oaks, the Royal Collections Trust and the John Carter Brown Library at Brown University.

== Gallery ==
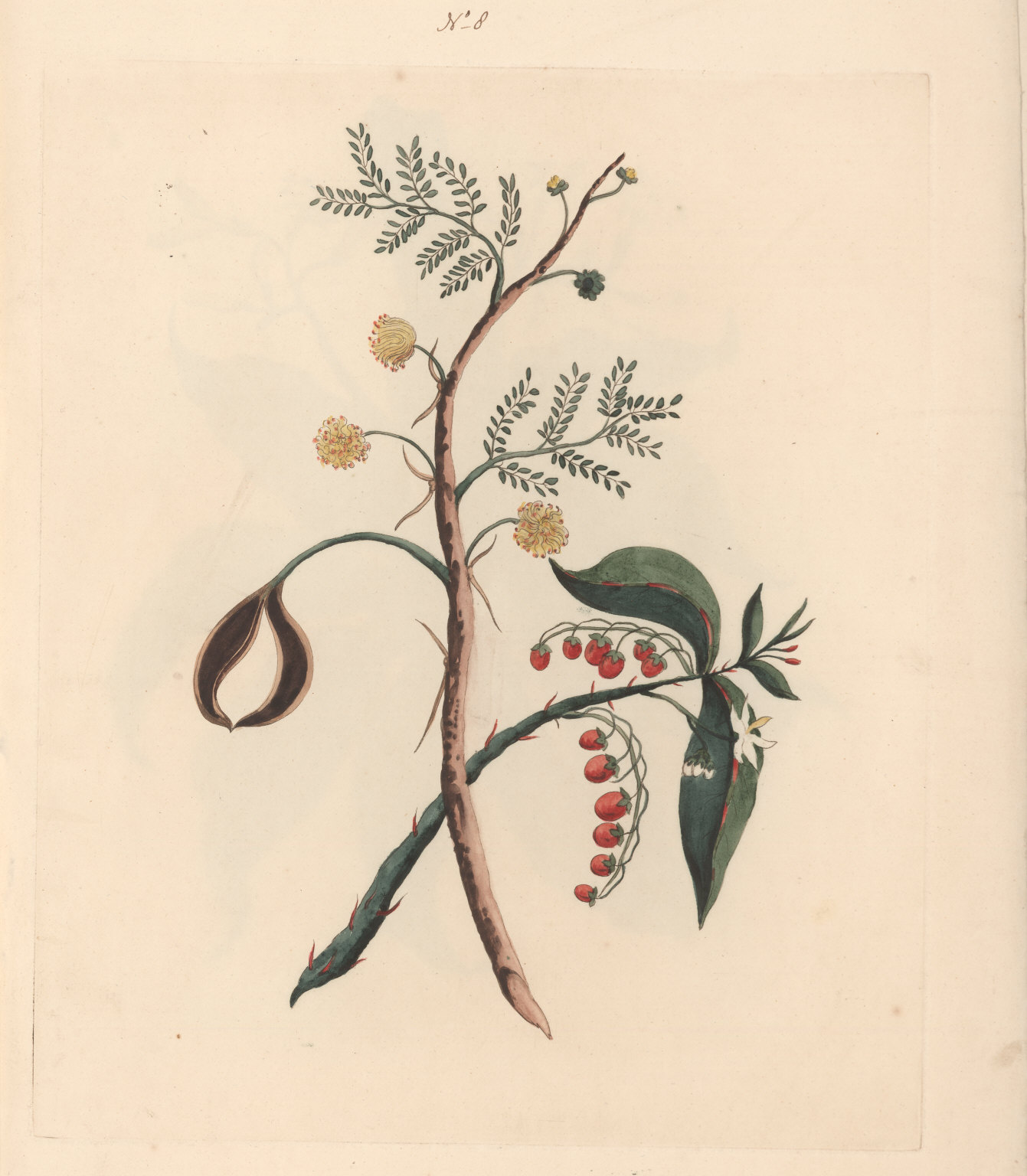
Acacia mimosa

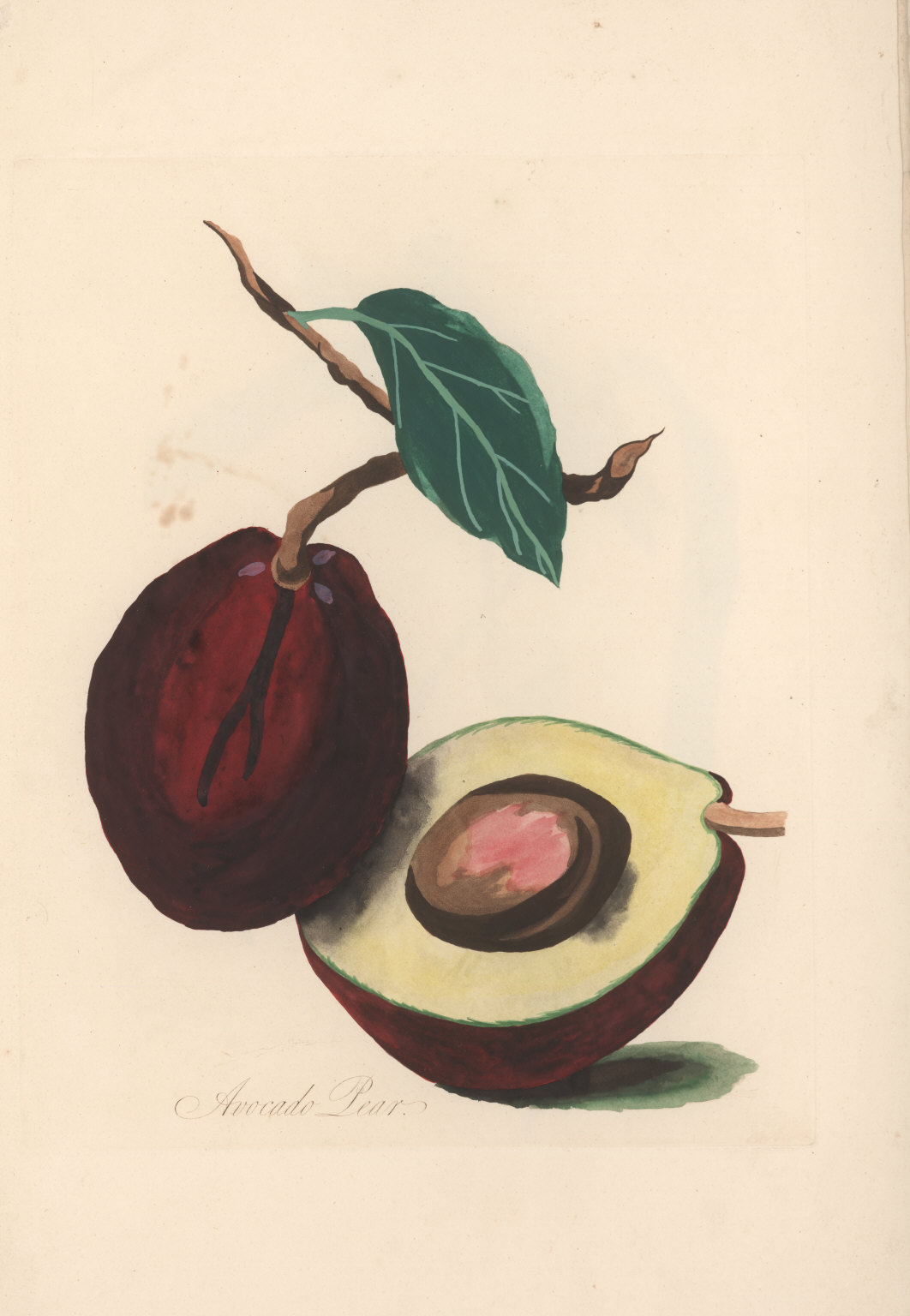
Avocado pear

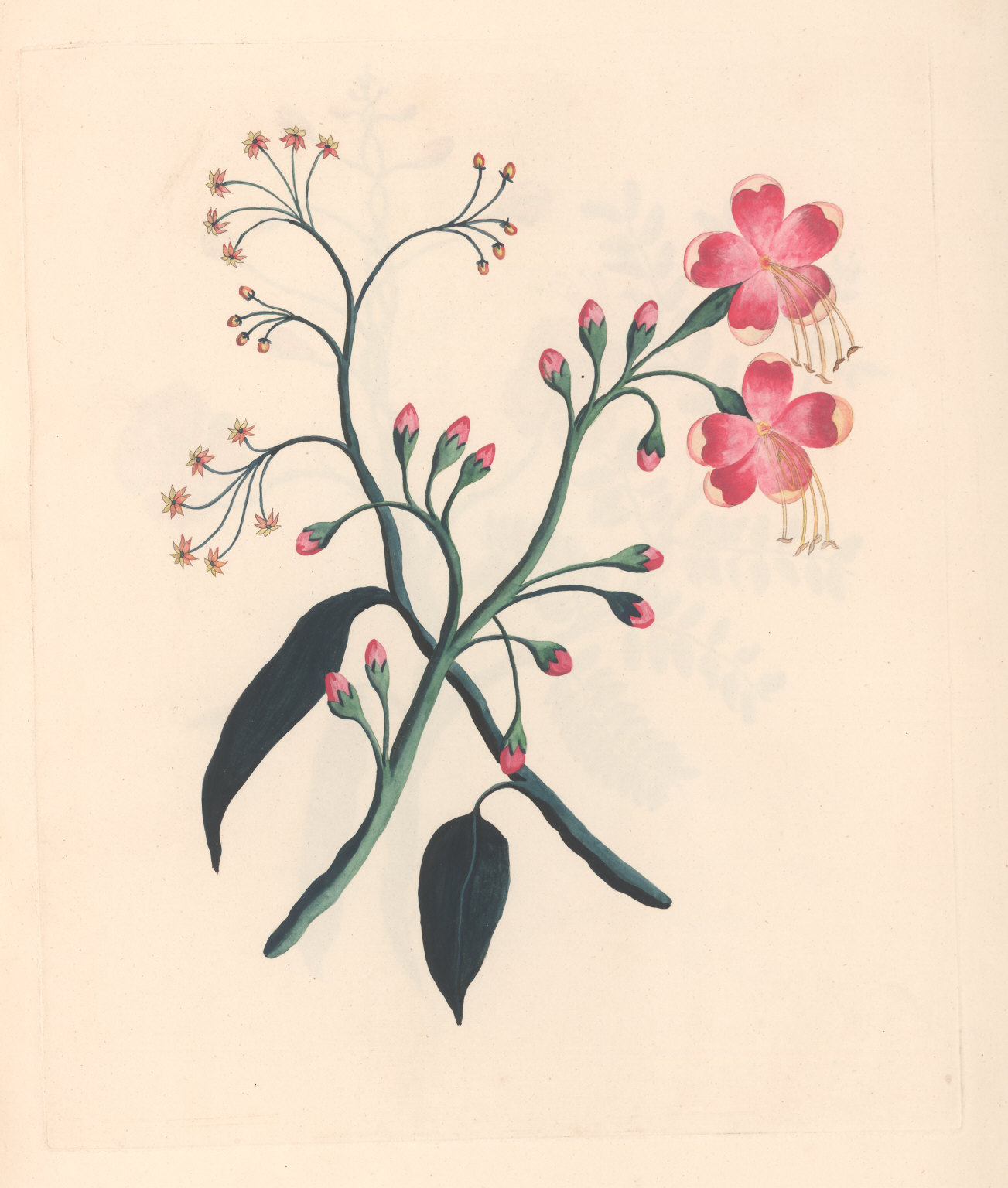
Bombay gossipium

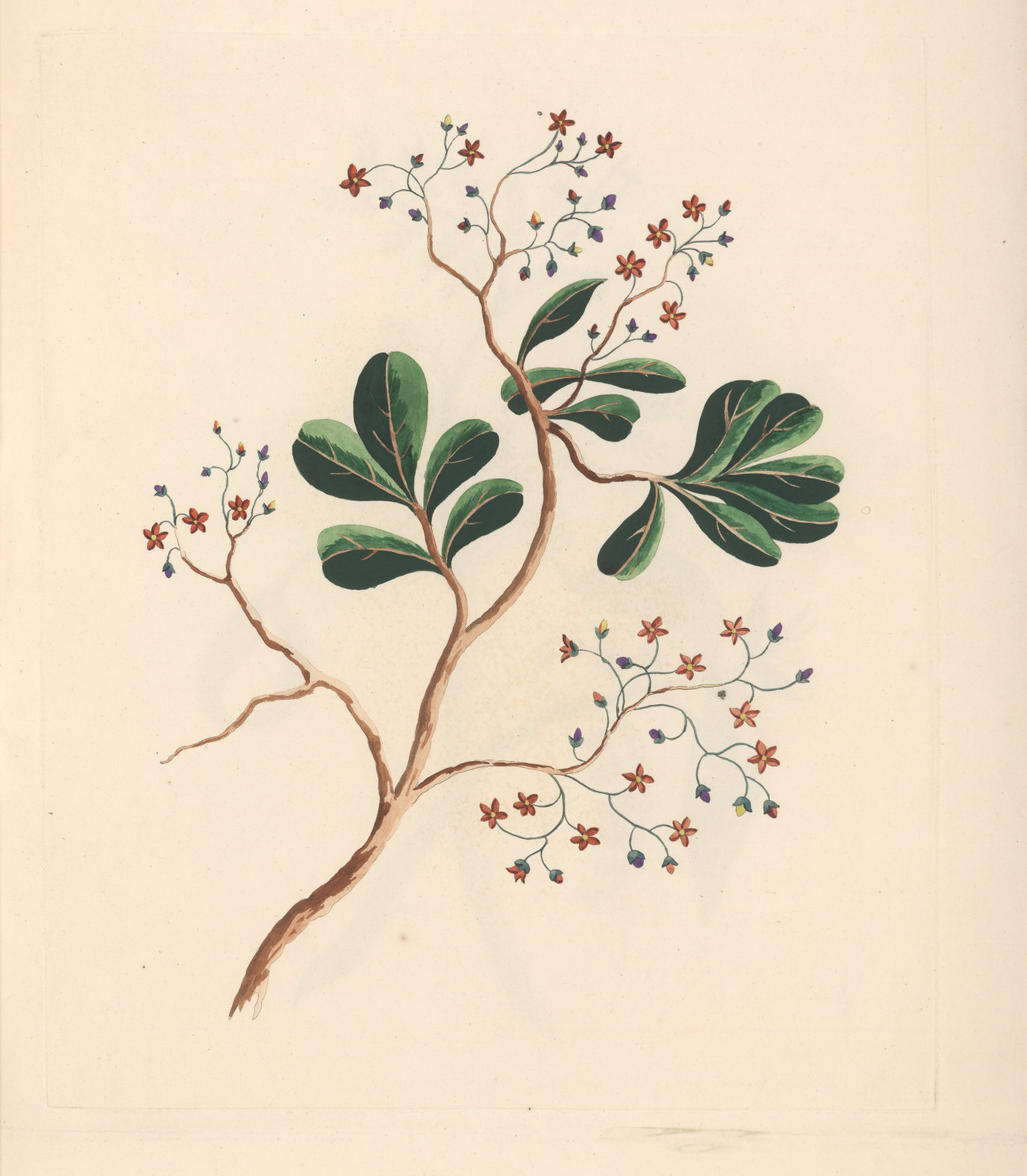
Canella alba

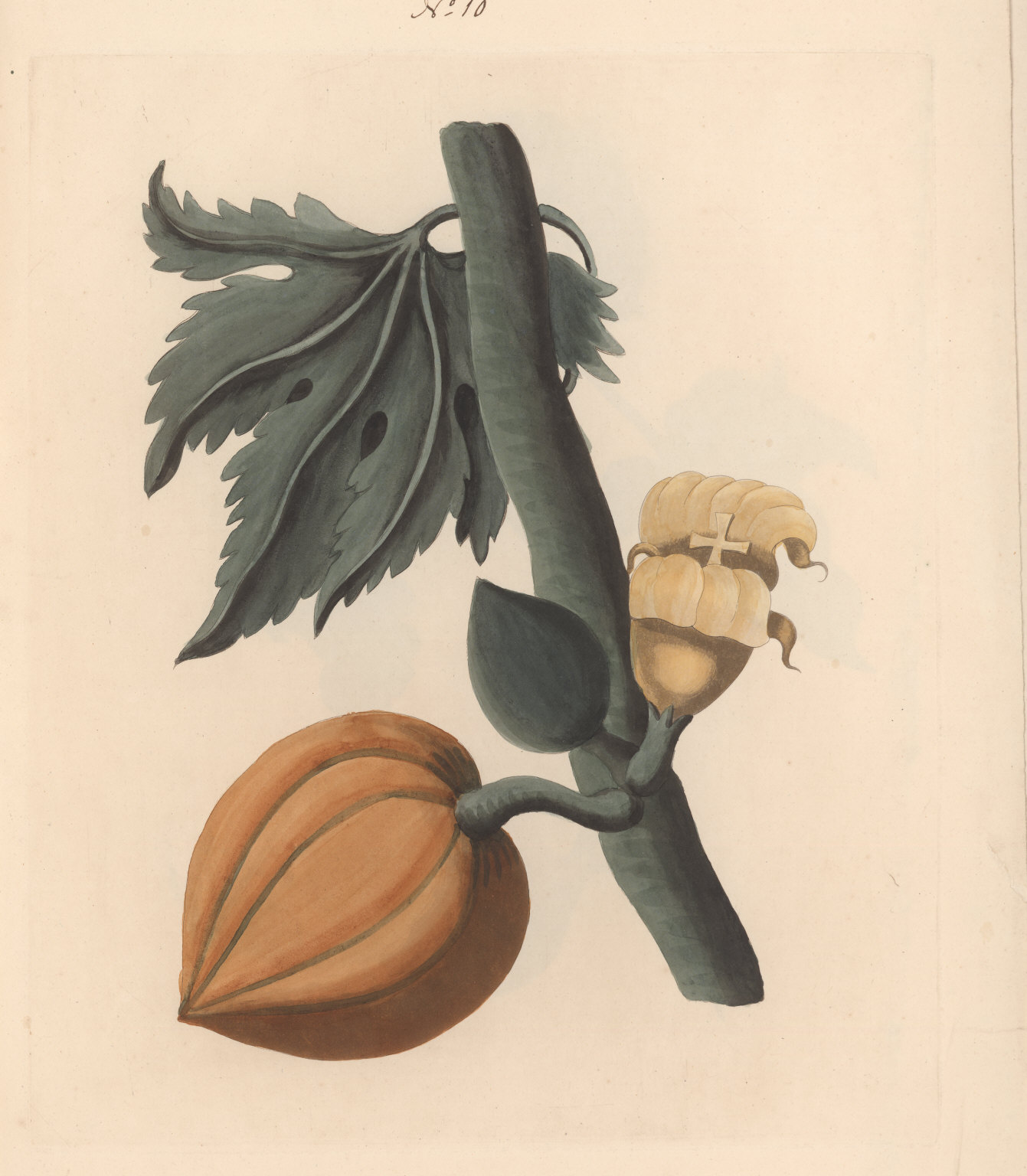
Carica papaya female

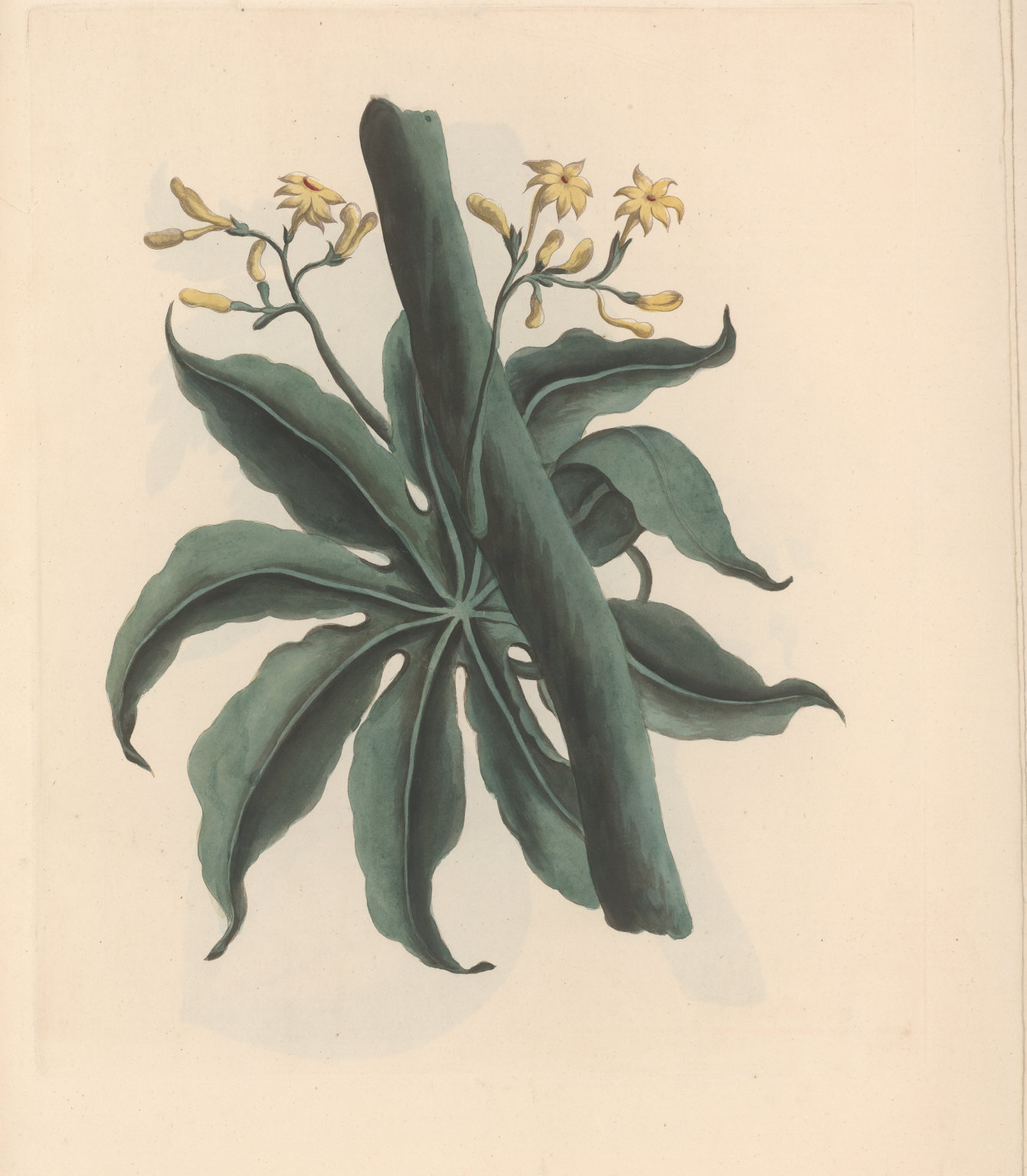
Carica papaya

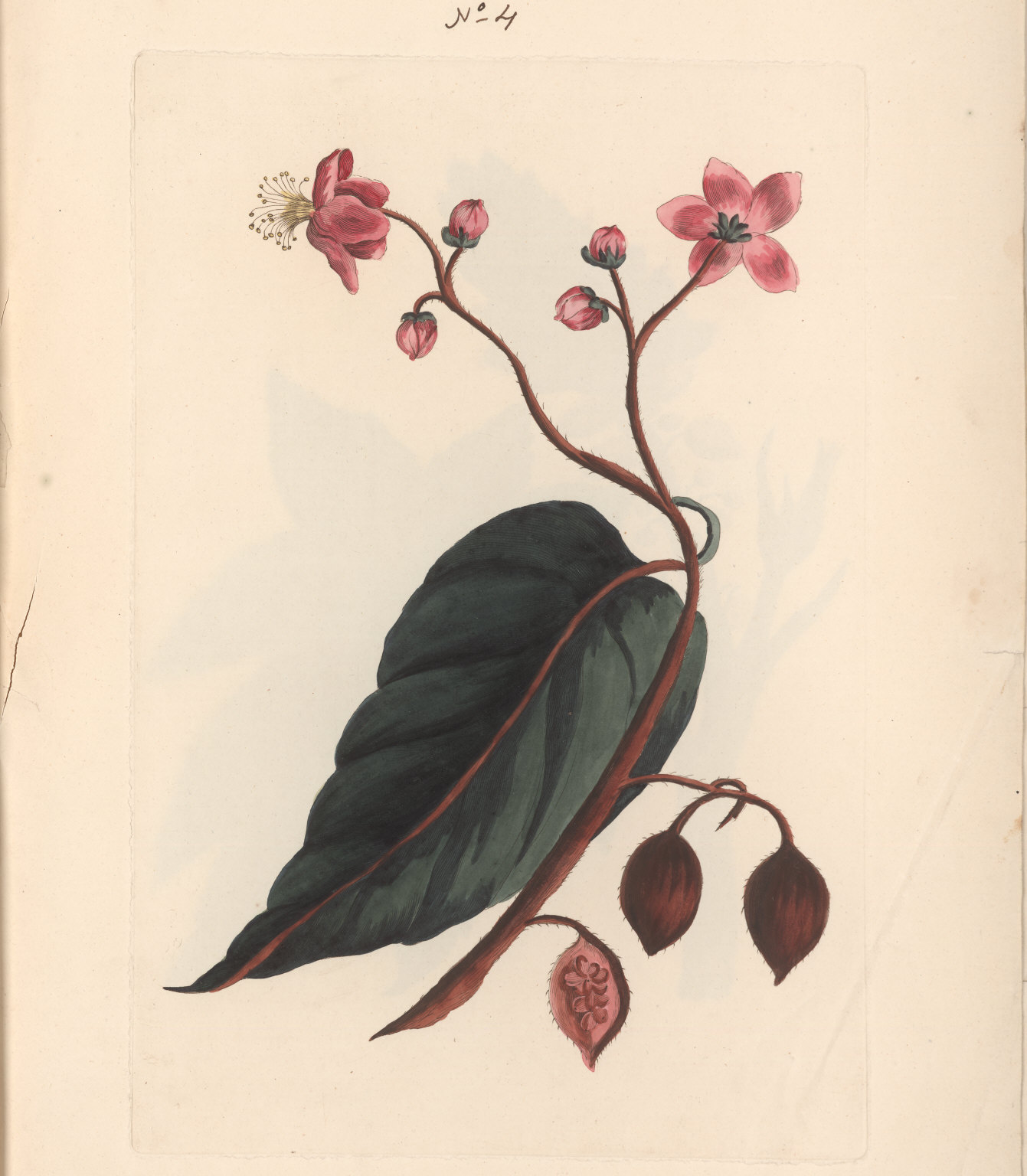
Rocou

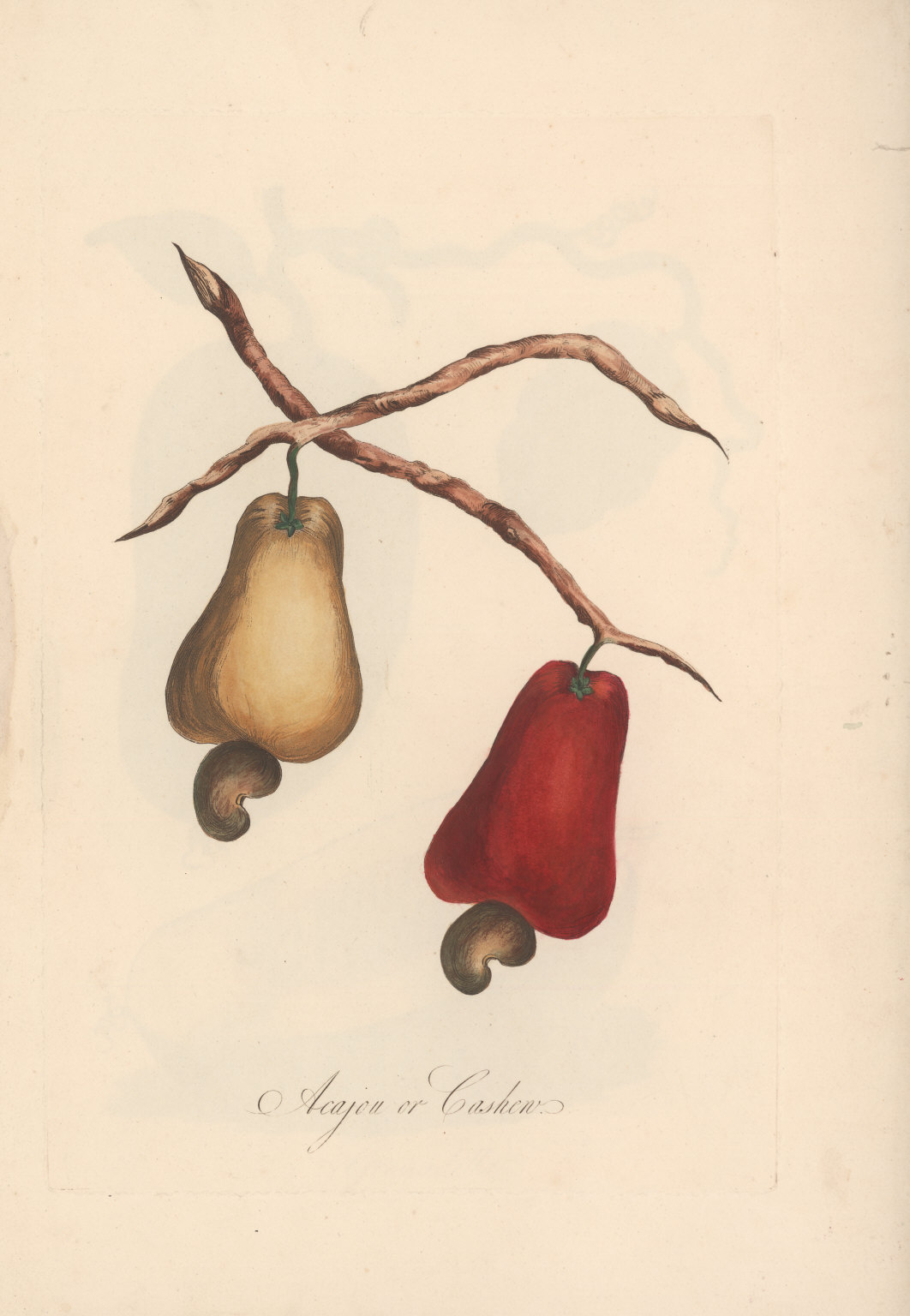
Cashew

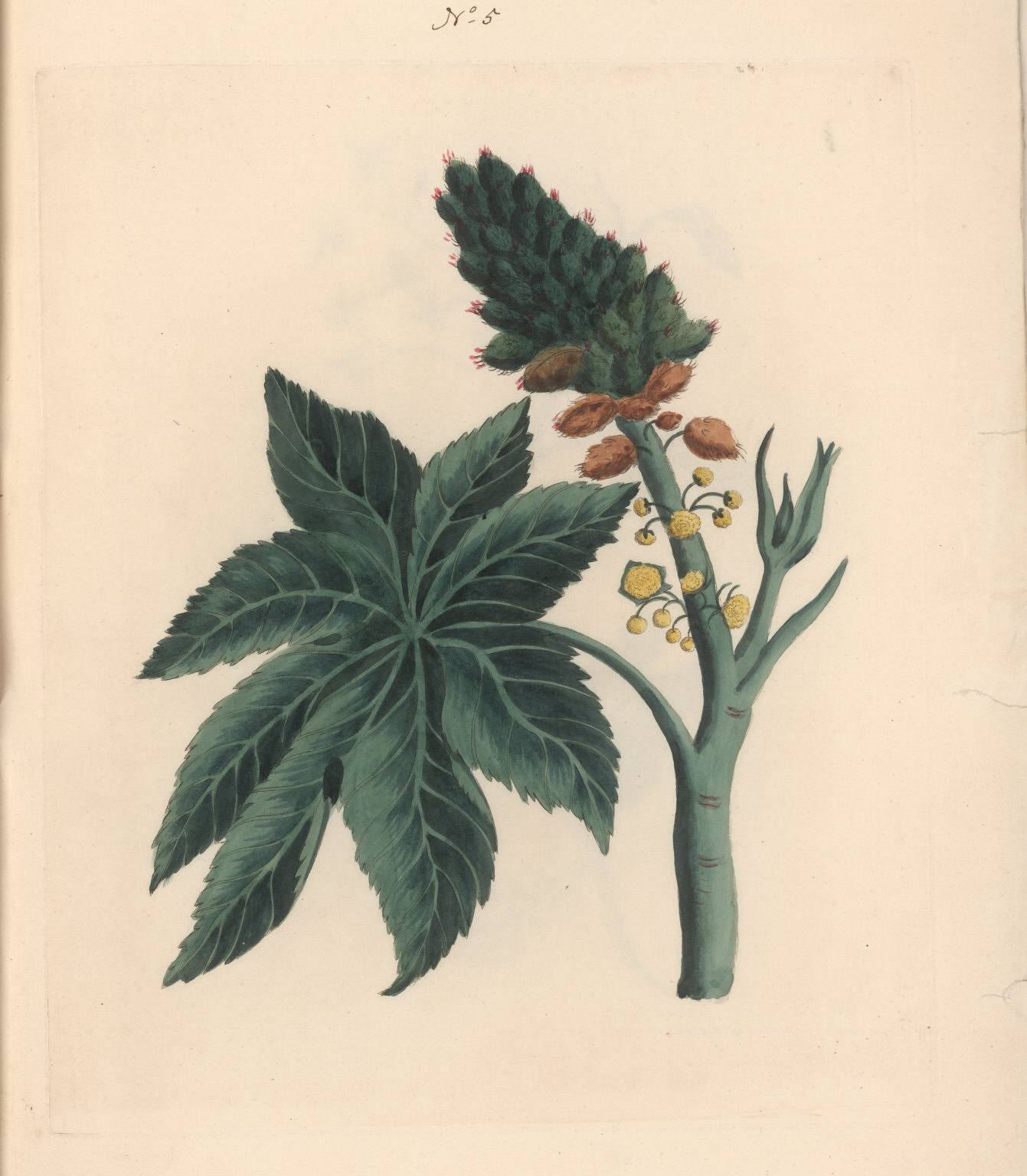
Castor

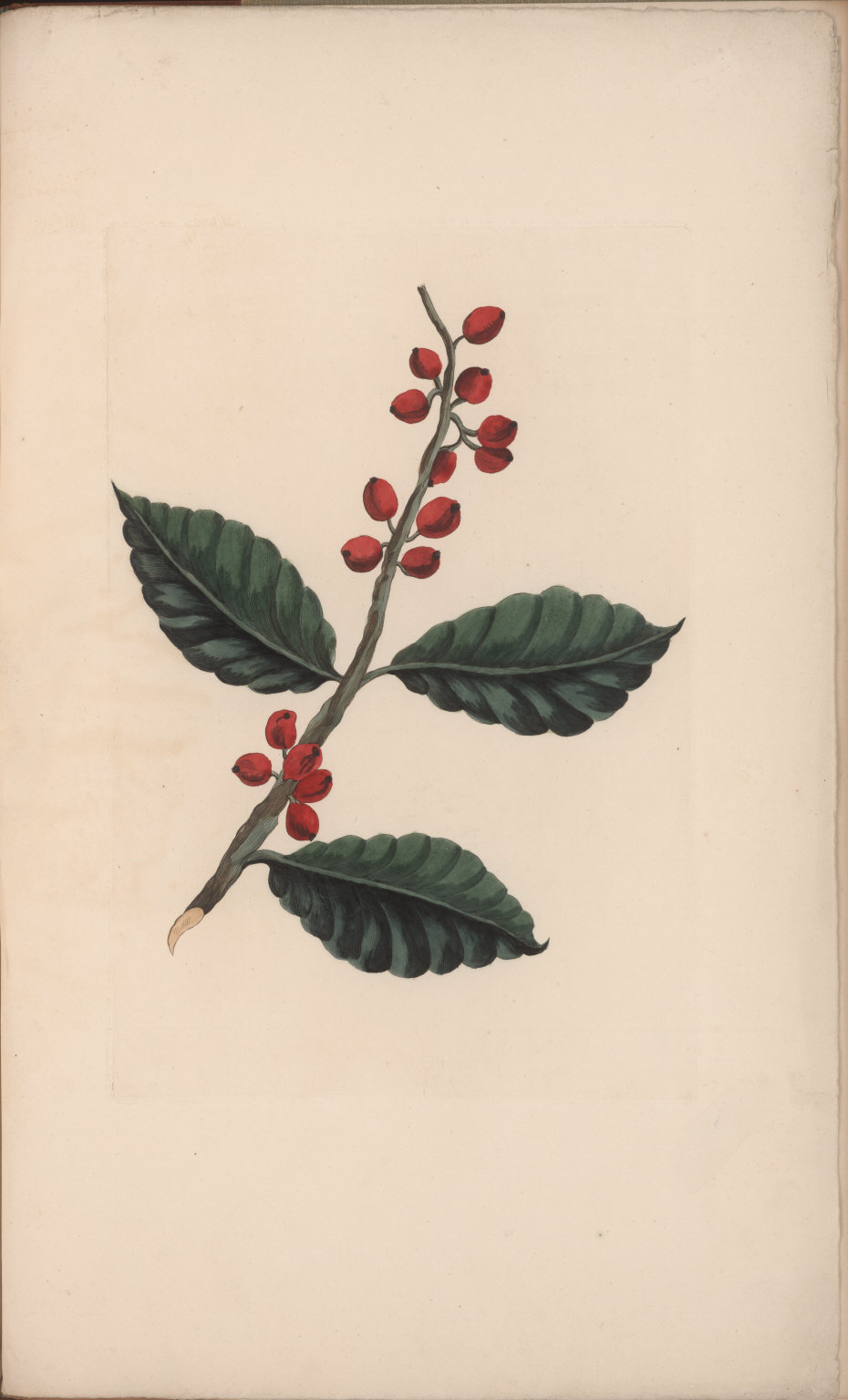
Coffee tree

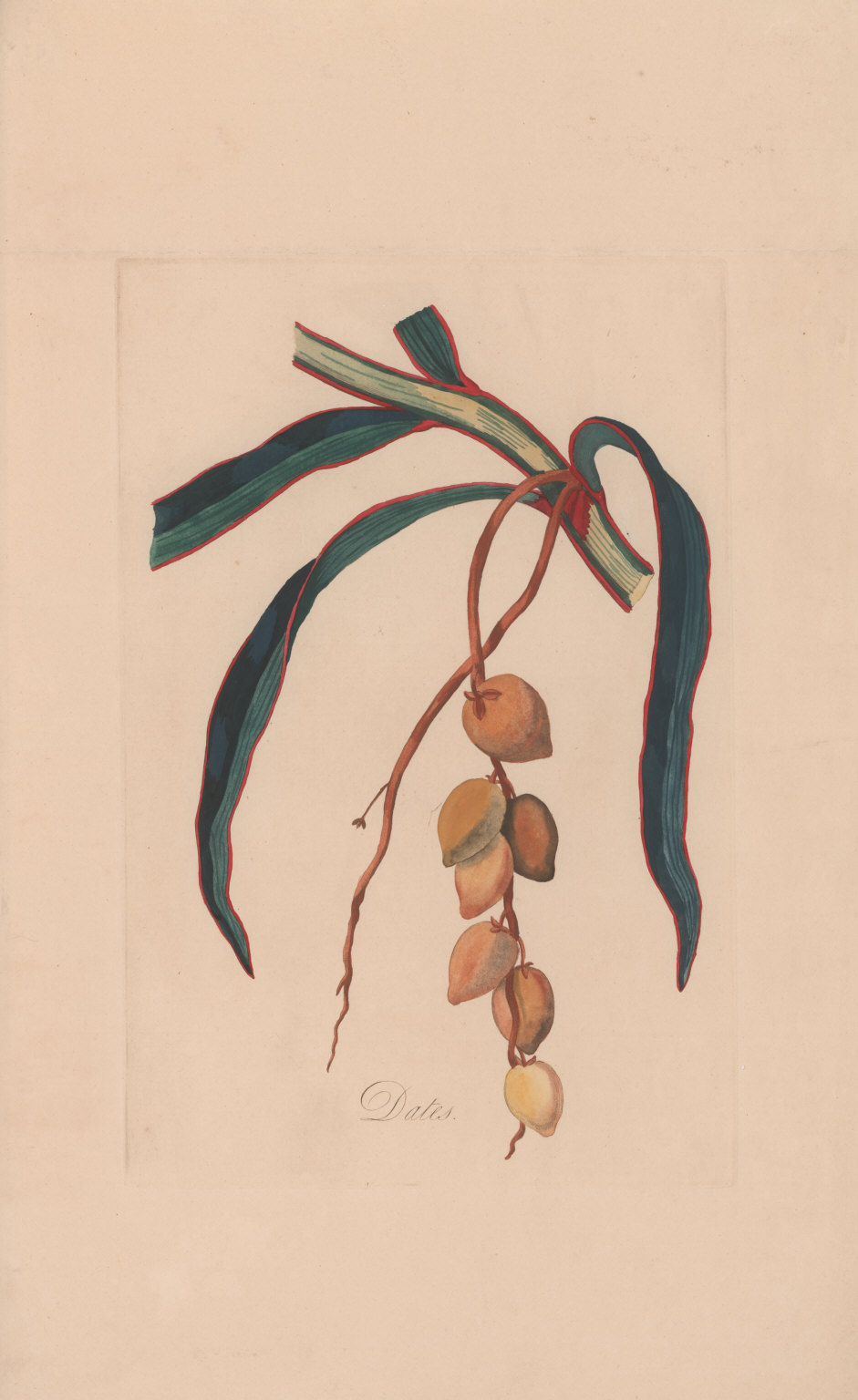
Dates

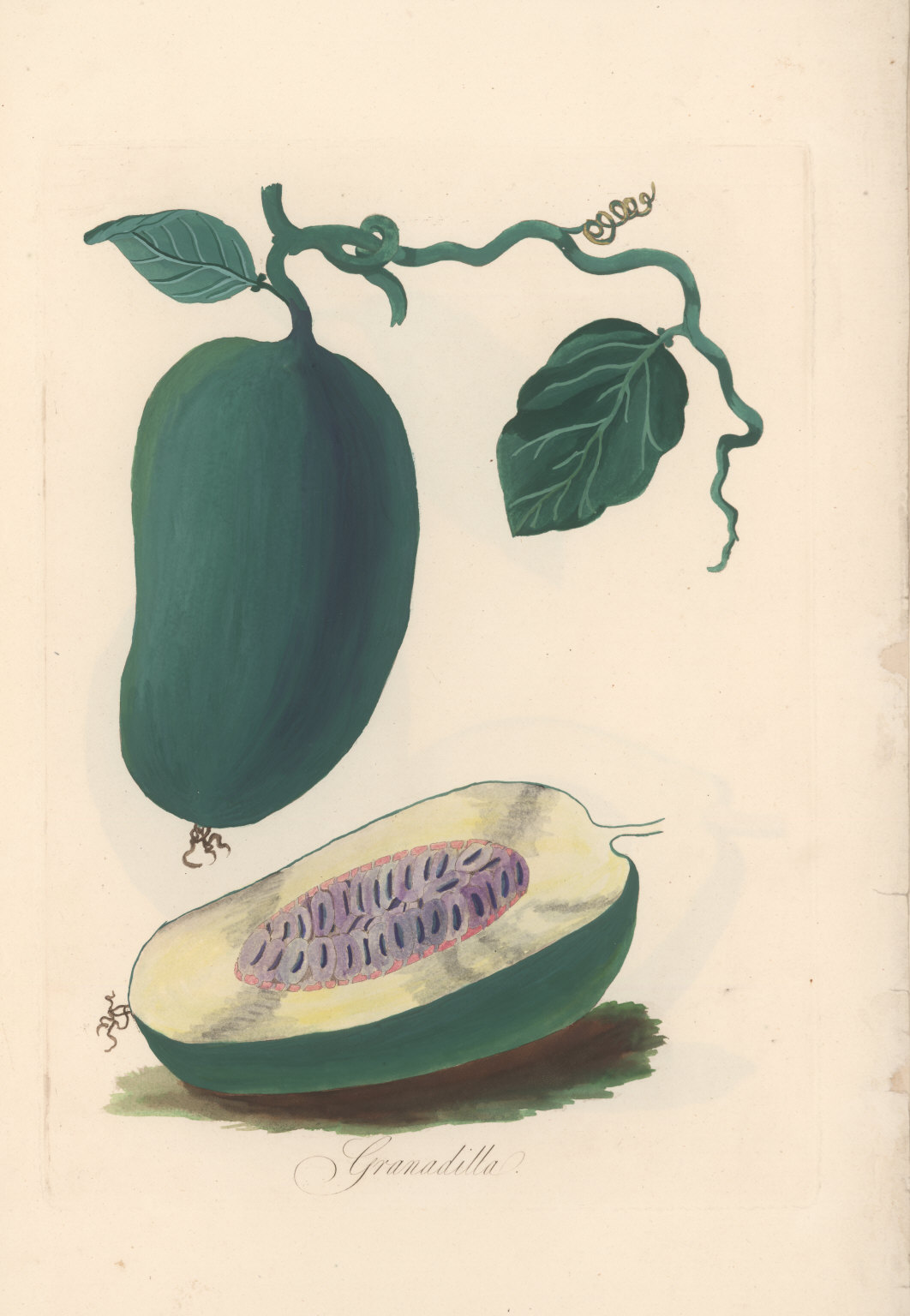
Granadilla

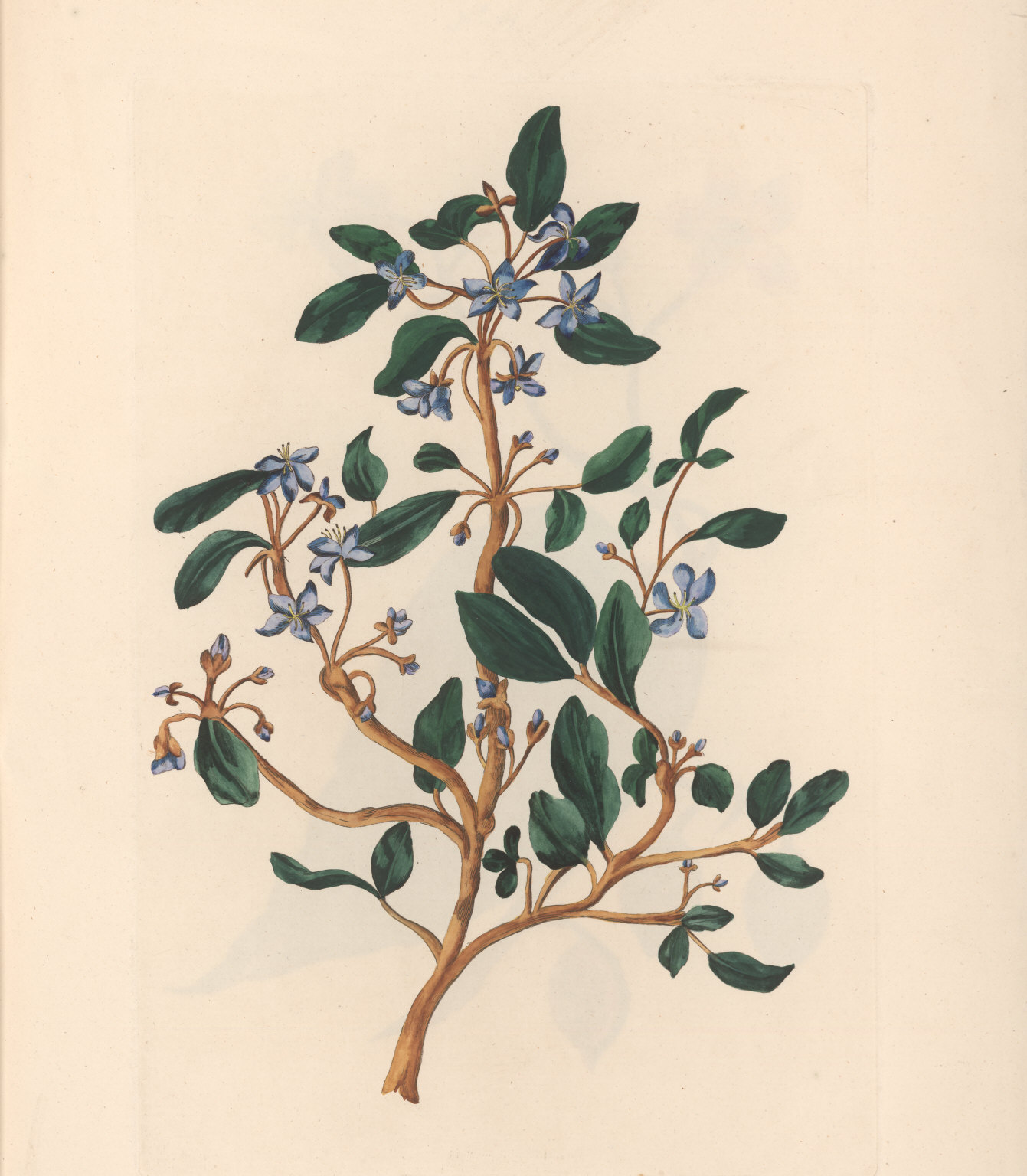
Guaiacum

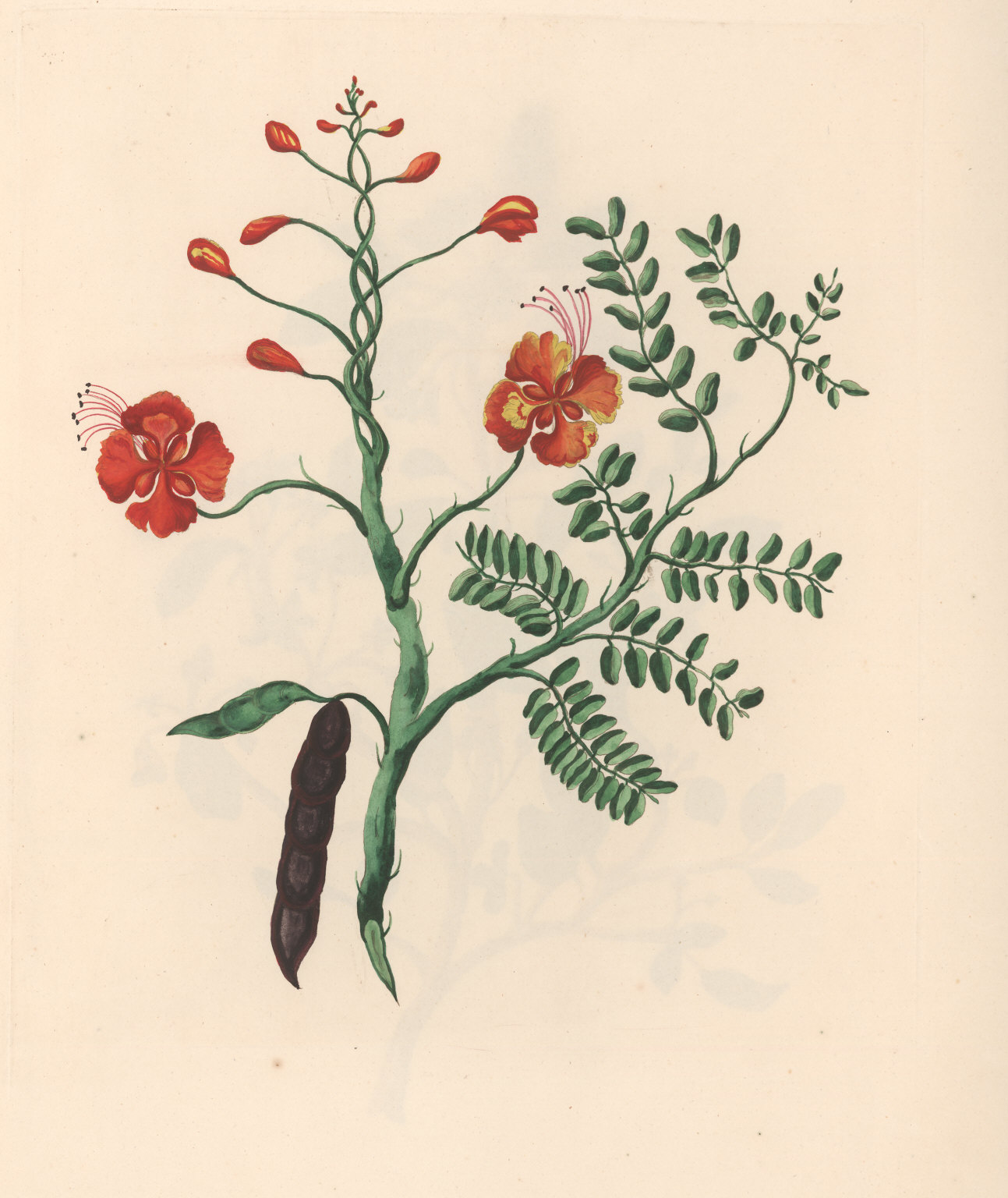
Poinciana

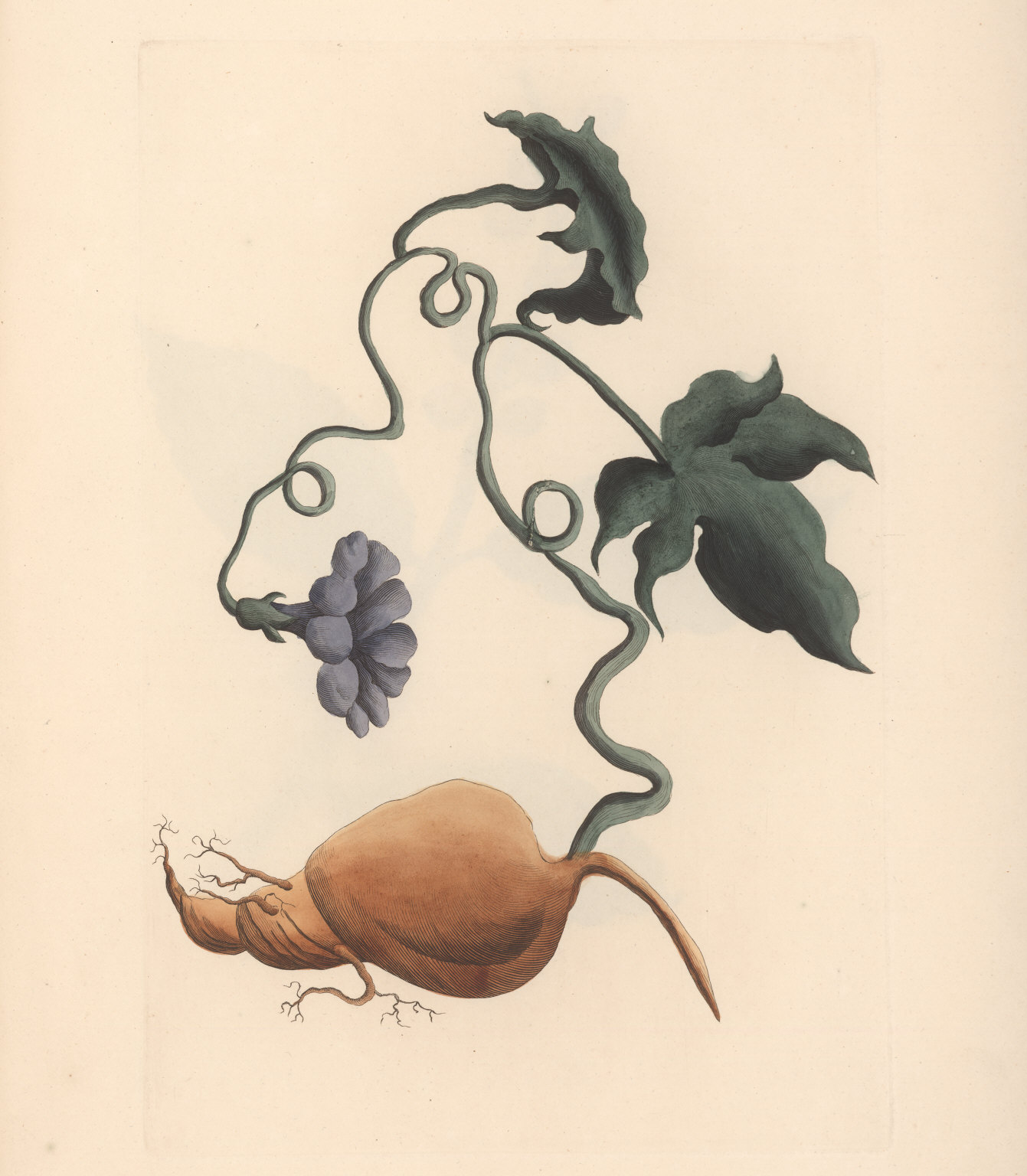
Potato vine

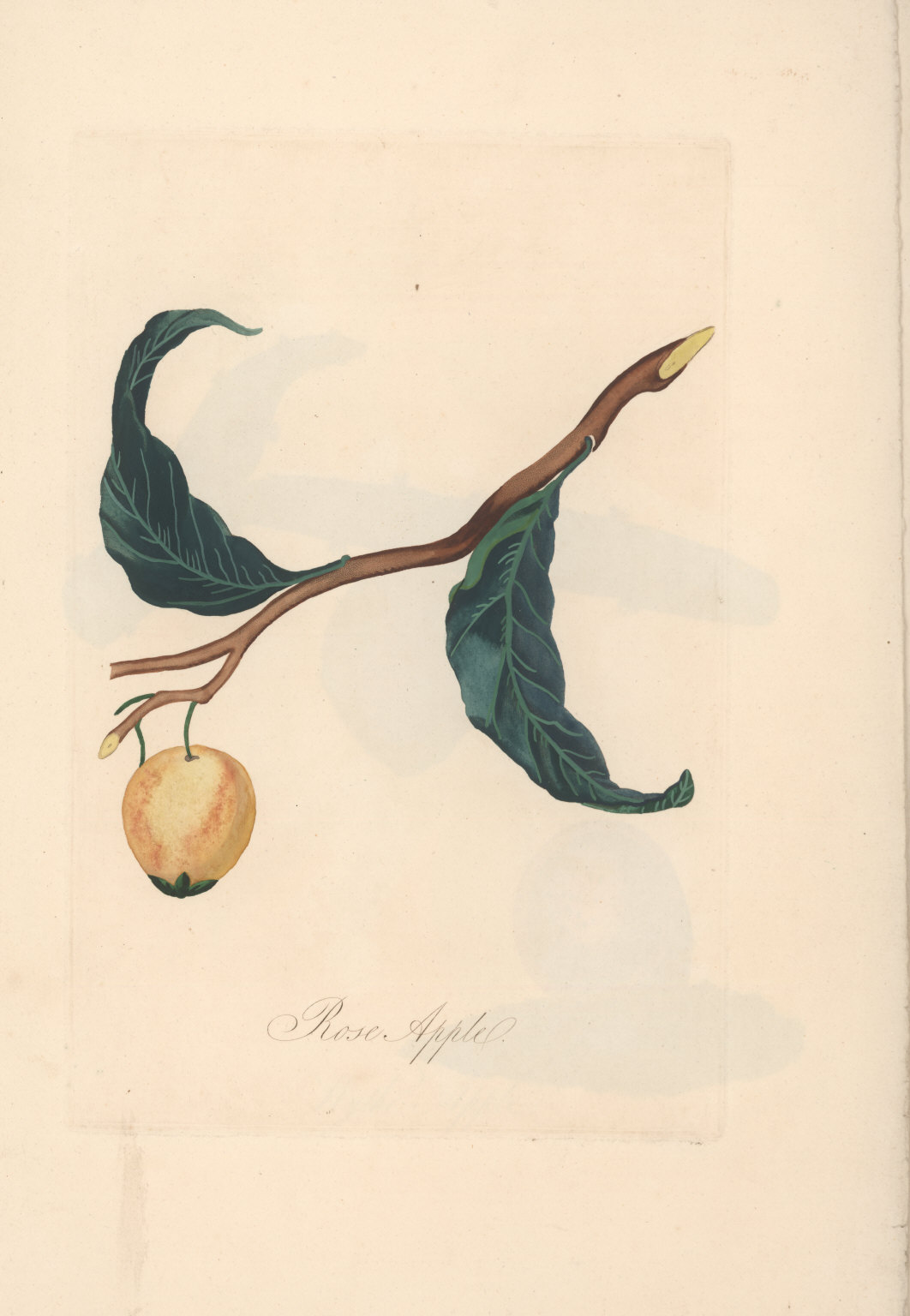
Rose apple

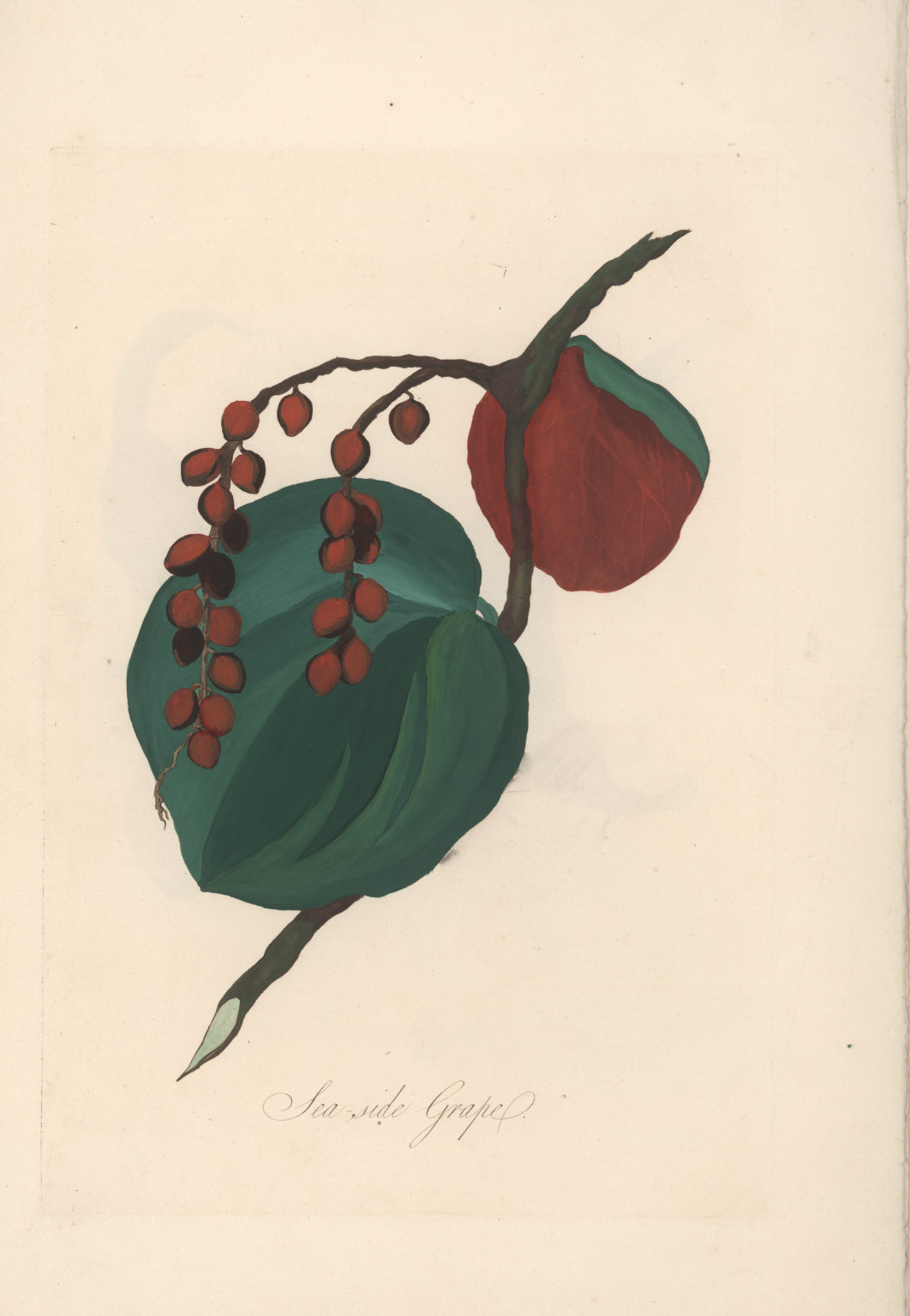
Sea-side grape

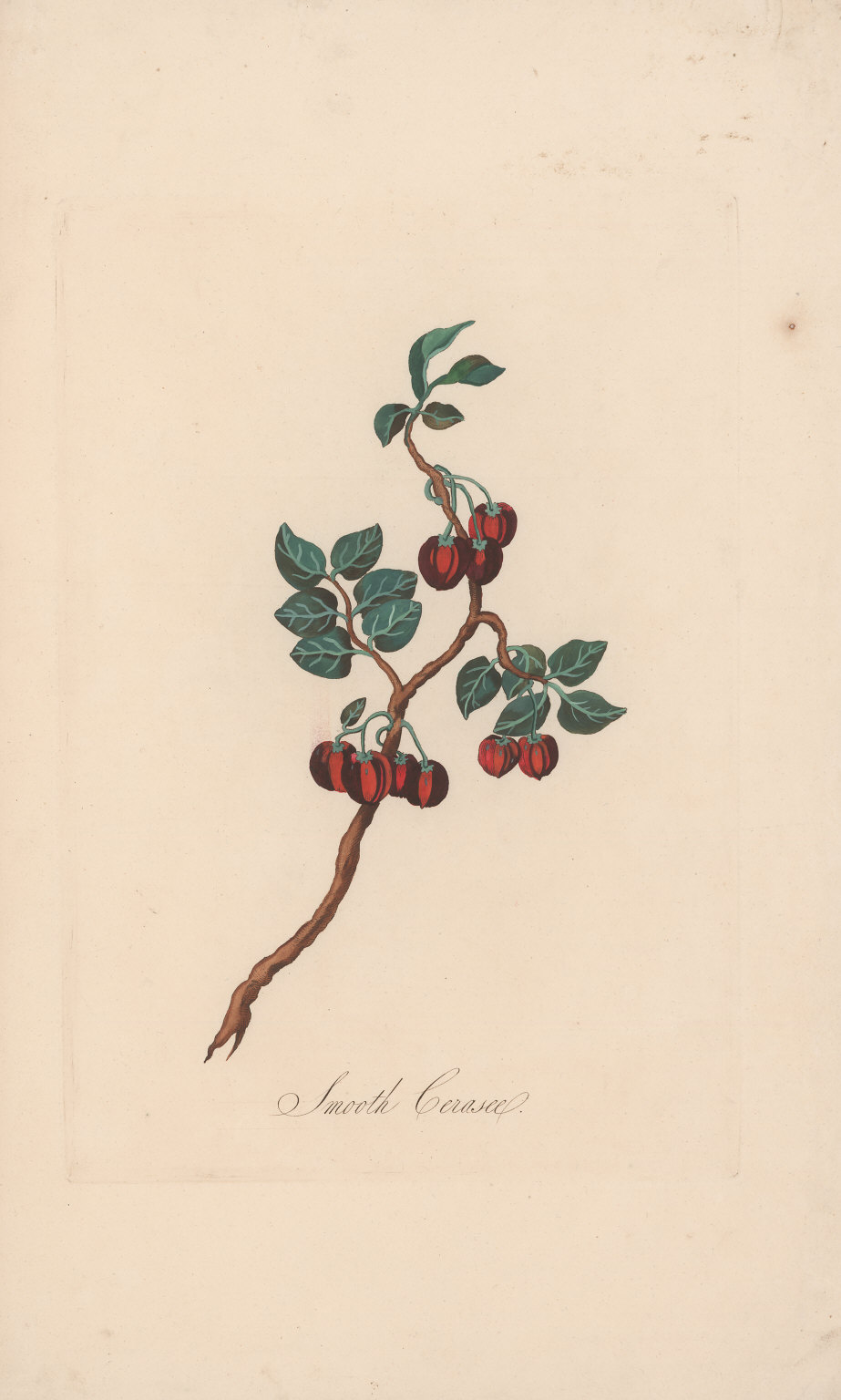
Smooth cerasee

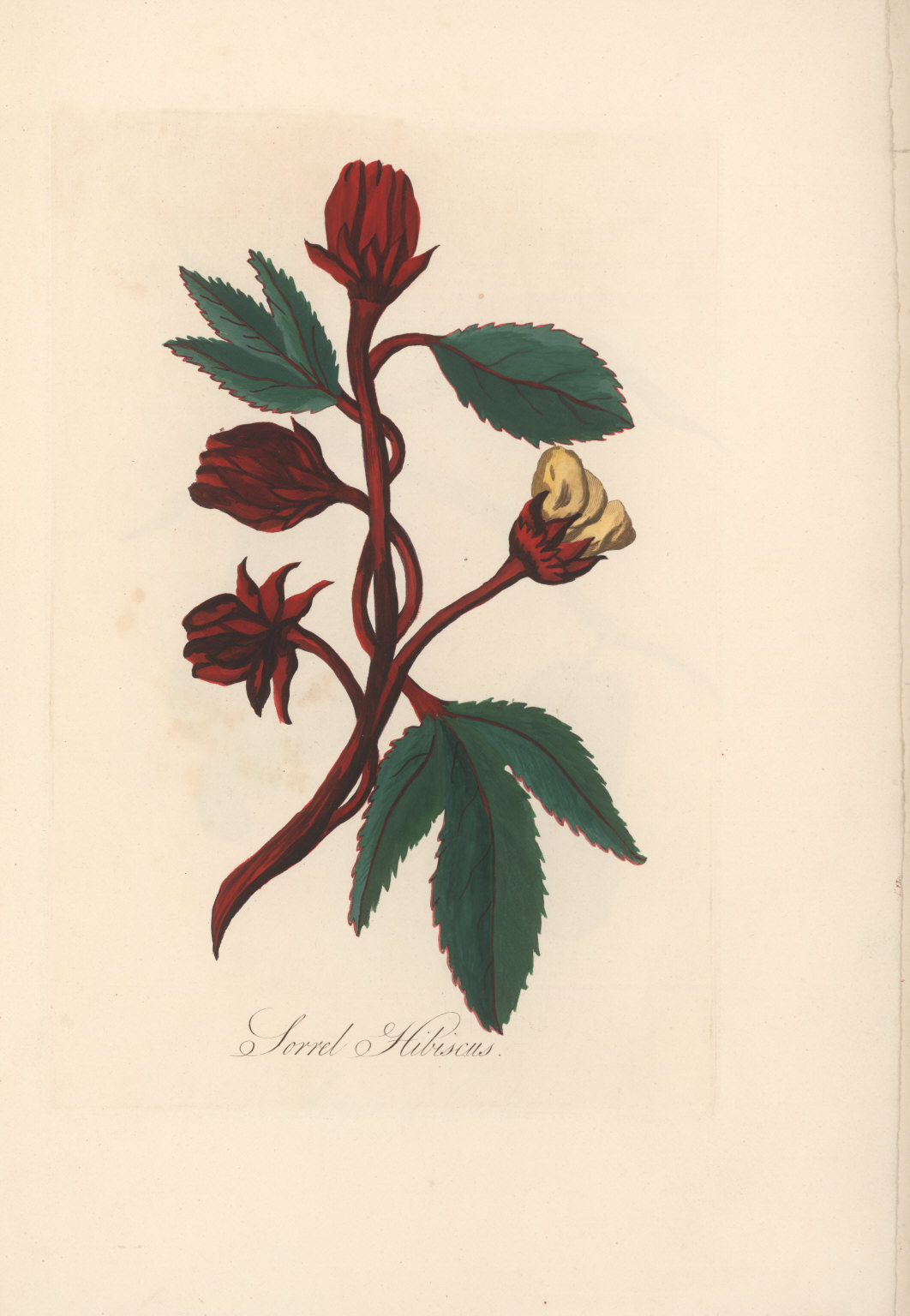
Sorrel hibiscus

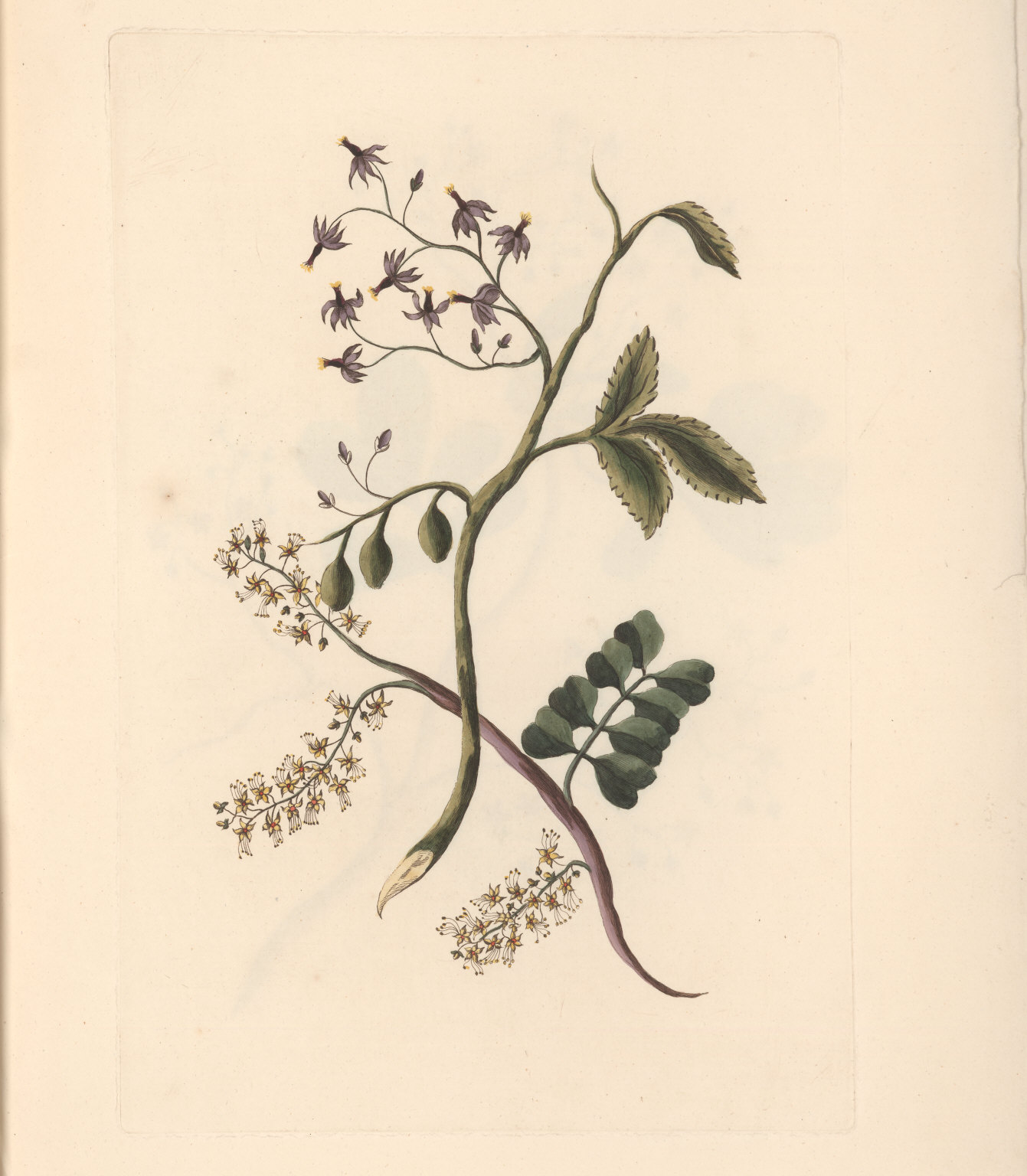
Syringa lacinitia

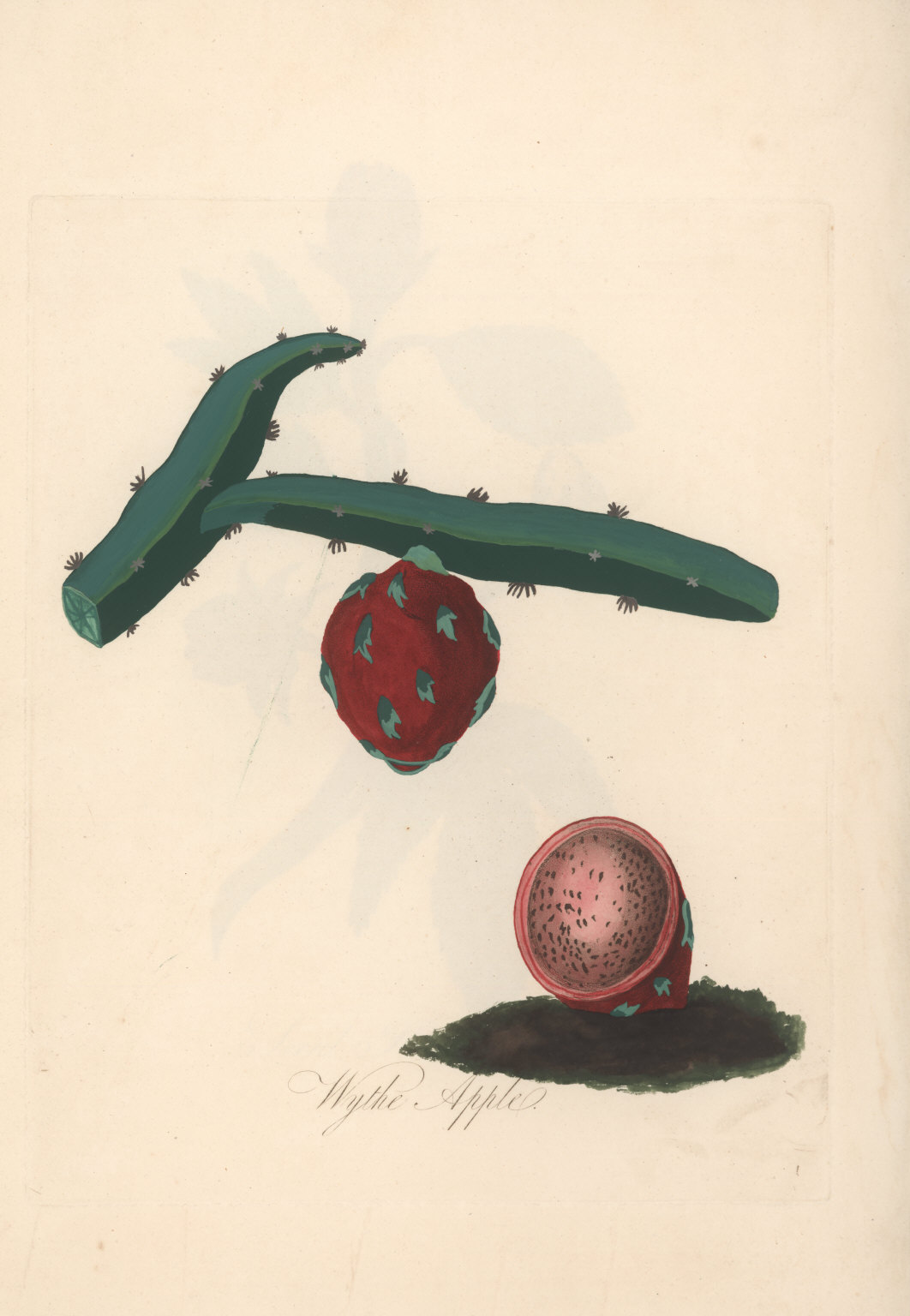
Wythe apple

== See also ==
- Maria Riddell
