= Temple of the Beastmen =

Board game published in 1989 by Game Designers' Workshop

Temple of the Beastmen is a board game published in 1989 by Game Designers' Workshop.

== Contents ==
Temple of the Beastmen is a game in which characters explore levels of a randomly generated underground complex using area tiles.

== Reception ==
Richard Ashley reviewed Temple of the Beastmen for Games International magazine, and gave it 2 stars out of 5, and stated that "I would like to see this game do well as it has a lot going for it, but I feel that in its present form people would be rather disappointed with it and lost interest."

== Reviews ==
- Jeux & Stratégie nouvelle formule #4
- Casus Belli #58
