= David Lee Ingersoll =

American cartoonist

- Born: Anchorage, Alaska, United States
- Occupations: Cartoonist, Illustrator
- Known for: "Misspent Youths" comic series; - Illustrations for RPG publications: "Oz Squad" comic
- Website: Official Website

David Lee Ingersoll is a cartoonist and illustrator based in Seattle, United States. Born in Anchorage, Alaska soon after the 1964 earthquake, he spent most of his childhood and young adult years in northern California, specifically the then small town of Sebastopol. He started drawing at an early age, preferring to concentrate on dinosaurs and other monsters.

He has primarily been active in small press publications, contributing illustrations to Factsheet Five and a variety of horror and sci-fi zines in the late eighties and early nineties, creating the comic series Misspent Youths in 1991, and contributing comics to GLYPH Magazine in the late nineties. He is currently contributing to The Black Seal, Worlds of Cthulhu, various RPG publications and illustrating the comic Oz Squad. He is an illustrator for the publisher Chaosium including a cover for the novel The Spiraling Worm.

He is married to writer Sarah Byam. Poet Glenn Ingersoll is one of his brothers.
