= Sarah Byam =

American writer

Sarah Byam is an American writer. She is the author of Billi 99.

== Biography ==
During the 1990s Byam wrote a variety of comic books for different publishers. This writing includes the series Mode Extreme and Black Canary. She also wrote individual stories for Elfquest, What If, Glyph and other publications.

She is married to the illustrator David Lee Ingersoll.

== Awards ==
- 1992: Nominated for "Best Writer" Eisner Award, for Billi 99
