= Dragon Dice =

Dice game

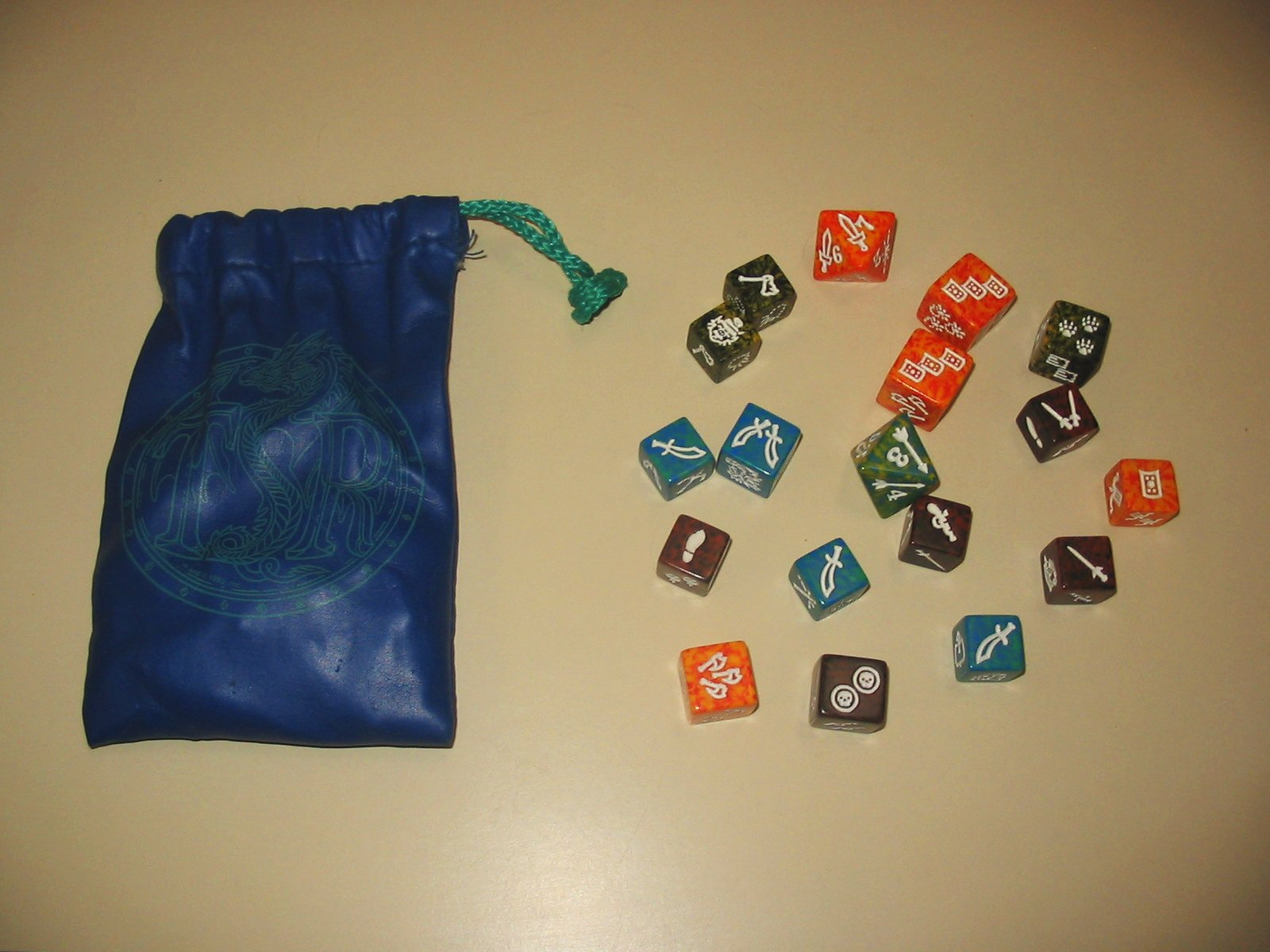
- Designers: Lester W. Smith
- Publishers: TSR, SFR, Inc
- Years active: 1990's–present
- Genres: Fantasy
- Playing time: Varies
- Chance: Dice rolling

Dragon Dice is a 1995 collectible dice game originally made by TSR, Inc., and is produced today by SFR, Inc. It is one of only a handful of collectible dice games produced in the early 1990s. The races and monsters in Dragon Dice were created by Lester Smith and include some creatures unique to a fantasy setting and others familiar to the Dungeons & Dragons role-playing game.

The game simulates combat between armies of fantasy races for control of a young world named Esfah. Dragon Dice classifies magical power by element: air, earth, fire, water, and death. Nearly every race in the game is composed of two of these elements. In the original edition, dragons and dragon-related dice (Dragonkin) were all composed of a single element each. However, SFR has since released "hybrid" dragons representing each two-element combination, in addition to white and ivory dragons (where ivory represents no elemental affinity and white represents affinity with all elements).

Dragon Dice was one of the last original games produced by TSR, and an unexpectedly high return of unsold units contributed to the financial crisis that resulted in the sale of TSR to Wizards of the Coast.

== Premise ==
Dragon Dice is set in the fictional world of "Esfah." Esfah was created by the goddess Nature, and the Father of All. These two deities had several children, each of whom represented one of the major elements described by Plato (Fire - Firiel, Earth - Eldurim, Wind - Ailuril, Water - Aguarehl), and one of whom was named "Death." After Nature's children created two races, the Coral Elves (Selumari) and Dwarves (Vagha), Death created its own set of races, the Goblins (Trogs) and Lava Elves (Morehl), bent on causing mischief and discord. Nature and her children became enveloped in a continuing war with Death, each causing the birth of several new races, including the Amazons, Firewalkers, Undead, Feral, Swampstalkers, Frostwings, Scalders, and Treefolk. Players, acting as army Commanders, assemble race units and compete against each other in a battle on selected terrain. Commanders may summon Dragons, representing the cardinal elements, which attack each other and all other creatures. Legendary units, Dragonhunter and Dragonmaster leaders of The Eldarim, each holding the power of one of Esfah's elements, grew within the ebb and flow of the war.

Players then use their dice to represent either the forces of Good or Evil in this setting. For example, you could be anyone from the Coral Elf Commander, leading your army on a path to destroy Death races, driven by that which stole your peaceful existence and attacked Mother Nature, to the Treefolk General, leading a harmonious balanced life in Water and Earth. Or, maybe you just want to light stuff on Fire raging in tumultuous Air tides.

== Goal ==
The goal of a standard game of Dragon Dice is to capture two of any of the terrains being fought over. This is achieved by one player's armies controlling two terrains that have their terrain die turned to the eighth face, as explained below. The game can also be won if a player has the last surviving unit(s) in play. Any number of players can share in this struggle.

== Types of dice ==
=== Units ===
Any six-sided die or ten-sided die (see Monsters, below) that belongs to a race is a unit. The color(s) of the dice identify each race and represent the elements that comprise each. The dice come in four sizes, each corresponding to a particular amount of "health" from 1 to 4 points. One side on each unit die has an ID icon, which identifies the unit and generates results equal to the health of the die towards whatever action is being rolled for. The remaining sides have either normal action icons (representing magic, maneuvers, melee, missiles, or saves) or special action icons (SAI) that generate special effects or results. Generally, the more health a unit has, the more icons it will have. Units are also divided by class as well as size, reflecting their specialty. Most races have five classes of unit, plus monsters (or champions for the Eldarim), but while most races share a number of classes (Cavalry, Magic, Melee), some are unique to certain races (Light Magic, Light Melee, Light Missile).

MONSTERS are ten-sided dice that are units and have a single icon on each face which generate 4 points of effect (i.e.: 4 results) with the possible exception of some SAI effects. Monsters are part of a player's army and each one counts as four points of health.

Players build armies of units to a predetermined amount of health. The standard game is 36 points of health, but smaller and even larger games are not uncommon.

There are other six-sided dice that are mono-colored called Dragonkin that are not considered units. There are other ten-sided dice that are mono-colored called artifacts that are a type of magic item. Both are part of the Advanced Rules.

=== Terrains ===
TERRAINS are eight-sided and have two colors that indicate what elements comprise the terrain. For example, a Swampland terrain is green and gold, showing it is made of earth and water. Each face of a terrain die is numbered and has an icon for missile, melee, or magic. The number and the icon shown indicate how far apart armies at that terrain are. If a Magic icon (starburst) is showing, then the armies are so far apart they can only cast spells. A Missile face (arrow) means they are close enough to shoot at each other, and a Melee icon (sword) means they are close enough for hand-to-hand combat to take place. Each player brings two terrains to the game, one Home terrain and one proposed Frontier terrain. Some races gain benefits such as extra maneuvers or saves if they are at a certain terrain. The goal of the game is to control two such terrains by "turning" them to the 8th face. An army capturing an 8th face also gains double maneuvers and double saves. The eighth face of terrains has one of four special icons: City, Temple, Tower and Standing Stones. Each gives an additional bonus to the army that possesses them.

SFR released the "Battlefields" expansion in August 2010, featuring two new terrains: Feylands (green/red) and Wastelands (blue/red). Four new 8th face icons were also introduced that can only be used at the Frontier location: Dragon Lair, Grove, Castle, and Vortex. Minor terrains (smaller eight-sided dice) were re-released as part of this expansion.

=== Dragons ===
DRAGONS are twelve-sided and of a single (or two mixed) color(s). Each face has the image of a dragon part that will show what action the dragon takes when rolled against an army. Dragons must be summoned to a terrain through the use of magic. Players do not control dragons they summon, so bringing one into play can be risky since the possibility exists that it may attack the very player that summoned it. One dragon is brought to the game for every 24 health of units in play. Thus, in a 48 health game players would bring two dragons. SFR has released ten 2-colored HYBRID DRAGONS, 5 Ivory/color hybrid dragons, and a white dragon in both wyrm and drake forms. With the advent of these hybrid dragons, the total number of dragons is 44; 5 each of elemental wyrms and drakes, 10 each of hybrid wyrms and drakes, one each of ivory wyrm and drake, and one each of white wyrm and drake.

=== Expansions Introduced by SFR ===
2009: "Acolytes of the Eldarim": This fully expanded race now includes 1-health commons, 2-health uncommons, and 3-health rares, along with new racial abilities and spells. Like the DragonHunters and DragonMasters, these dice are monochromatic, and available in black, blue, gold, green, or red. (Upon closer inspection, the dice themselves are a combination of ivory and the main color, which distinguishes them from Dragonkin.)

2009: "Dragonkin Expansion" re-releases the Dragonkin, which are 6-sided one-color units that can be summoned to a terrain and fight with the army there. Dragonkin come in 1-health commons, 2-health uncommons, 3-health rares, and 4-health Dragonkin Champions. Dragonkin will not fight against a dragon of the same color. For every full three points of other units a player brings to a game, he is allowed (but not required), to bring one point of dragonkin. Dragonkin are part of the Advanced Rules and start in the Summoning Pool.

2010: "Battlefields" includes two new basic terrain types, the Feylands (Fire and Water) and the Wastelands (Fire and Air). The terrains printed in white ink have the same four 8th Face types (City, Standing Stones, Temple, Tower) and are a part of the basic game. Also released as a part of this expansion are minor terrain versions of these new terrains (as well as Coastlands, Flatlands, Highlands, Swamplands). These minor terrains represent lesser objectives that may give your army a needed boost if you're willing to take a risk. Minor terrains are part of the Advanced Rules.

The Battlefields expansion also contains special terrains printed in gold ink with new 8th Faces: the Dragon's Lair, Grove, Castle, and Vortex. These special gold-printed terrains can only be placed at the Frontier. They can never be home terrains, so there will only be a maximum of one special terrain in play during a game. Otherwise, special terrains act just like normal terrains, except that their icon progression is set by the eighth face icon, not by their elemental colors.

2011: "DragonCrusader and DragonZealots" are Eldarim Champions (along with DragonLords / DragonMasters and DragonSlayers/DragonHunters) and have the ability to control dragons. Each DragonCrusader or DragonZealot that rolls its SFR logo allows the acting player to control one dragon. The dragon may be held motionless (i.e.: it is not rolled) and the army can attack it normally. Or the dragon may be made part of the attack against other dragons.

== The Races ==
Each of the races of Dragon Dice has unique icons representing the basic action types - for instance Missile is a bow for Coral Elves, a slingshot for Goblins, and a flintlock pistol for Lava Elves. Each race also has access to different special icons on their rare or monster units. Beginning with Firewalkers, each later race also had unique spells using their magic color that only they could cast.

- Coral Elves (blue and green) are peaceable sea-dwelling elves who travel in flying "coral ships".
- Dwarves (red and gold) are stalwart warriors with horned helmets, two-headed axes and shields.
- Goblins (gold and black) are disgusting, ravenous creatures who ride wolves or leopards and cast curses.
- Lava Elves (red and black) are fierce death-mages who wield pistols and rapiers.
- Amazons (ivory with purple icons), the game's only humans, cast magic based on the terrain they are stationed at. (Per Chuck Pint, President of SFR, Amazons are WHITE units, NOT IVORY) (Per the rulebook, "Amazons are ivory, which signifies that they are not inherently any specific aspect...")
- Firewalkers (blue and red) are warriors from the sun who flew to Esfah to join its battles for sport.
- Undead (black and ivory with green icons), the reanimated dead, can use only death magic.
- Ferals (gold and blue) are various races of humanoid beasts or birds who fight with stone knives.
- Swamp Stalkers (green and black) are hideous snake-people who mutate other races into themselves.
- Frostwings (black and blue) are furry flying creatures with an affinity for ice. (As the last TSR-published "kicker" pack, Frostwings were underprinted and have become atypically rare.)
- Scalders (red and green), the only "kicker" produced by Wizards of the Coast before the game's production ceased, are twisted, malicious faeries and can harm those who attack them.
- Treefolk (gold and green) were printed by SFR after they acquired the abandoned licence. As they use the last unique combination of the game's five colors, additional multi-colour races are unlikely.
- Eldarim are the original race of Esfah, and are represented by single colour promo dice called Champions, worth four health each. In 2009, SFR released a new expansion called "Acolytes of Eldarim," single colour units of one to three health who have given up their racial heritage to learn from the Eldarim Champions. This "kicker" includes a new class of unit, the Shield Bearer.

== Gameplay ==
Before the start of the game, units are divided into three separate armies, Home, Horde and Campaign. Each starting army must have at least one die, but no more than half the total health of the entire army (but this restriction only applies to the starting set-up and no longer applies after the game begins). The Home army defends a player's Home terrain, the Horde army is placed at an opponent's Home terrain, and the Campaign army is placed at the Frontier. Before the start of the game, players roll their Horde armies, and the player with the most maneuver points may choose the Frontier terrain, or to go first.

On a player's turn, one is allowed two marches, or actions, with their armies. What action they may take depends on what icon is showing on the terrain face. However, a single army may not take two marches in the same turn.

=== Maneuver ===
Before taking an action with their army, a player may choose to attempt to move the terrain face up or down. They announce this, and if unopposed, change the terrain. If an opponent at the same terrain wishes to oppose the move, then both players roll their army, counting maneuver and ID icons for the total number of points rolled. If the acting player's total is equal to or exceeds the opposing player's total, then they win and may turn the terrain die one face up or down.

=== Magic ===
If the terrain face is a Magic icon, a player may attempt to cast magic and roll their army, counting magic icons and IDs. Those dice on which an ID is rolled may double their magic total if they match at least one color of the terrain. After tallying points, the acting player may cast spells to help their own armies or hinder an opponent's. Spells are assorted by color, and have varying effects such as inflicting damage, adding protection, or even summoning a dragon.

=== Missile ===
While at a terrain with a Missile face, the acting player can choose to shoot at an army at the same terrain or at the frontier. The army is rolled and all missile and ID icons are counted for the total number of hits. The targeted army is rolled for saves, and if enough saves are not generated, units are removed from the army and sent to the Dead Unit Area (DUA). The targeted player does not get to roll a return shot.

=== Melee ===
At a terrain with a melee (sword) icon showing, the acting player can choose to engage their opponent in a skirmish. The army is rolled, and all melee and ID icons are counted for the total number of hits on the targeted army. That army is then rolled for saves (like in a missile attack), and if enough saves are not rolled, the appropriate number of units are sent to the DUA. The targeted army then rolls for a counter-attack against the acting player's army, who must then save against the attack or send units to the DUA as well.

In the earliest editions of the game, the acting player may choose to engage in a charge attack. In a charge, the attacking army is rolled and all melee, maneuver, and ID icons are counted as hits (icons such as trample, which count as either maneuver or melee, in this context will count for both and are therefore worth double). The defending army is rolled at the same time, with saves tallied to block opposing hits and melee hits tallied to inflict damage on the attacking army, which cannot roll saves of its own.

In the revised editions of the game, charge and skirmish options disappeared in favor of rules clarity and for the sake of cohesive game play. In the modern version of the game, Melee actions follow the above mentioned "skirmish" rule and "charging" disappeared in favor of advanced racial abilities.

=== Reinforce and reserves ===
When a player has taken both marches, they may withdraw any number of units from terrains into the Reserves area. These units may then be sent to any terrain at the end of the player's next turn during the Reinforcement phase, but before others are withdrawn into the Reserves. Units in the Reserves may take a march, but they may not maneuver a terrain and are limited to attempting friendly magic (they cannot target an opposing army or affect a terrain). The one exception to this is Amazons, which may take a missile action to their Home terrain or the Frontier while in reserves.

=== Special Action Icons ===
Some units and monsters have SAIs (Special Action Icons). For example, a CANTRIP icon allows for up to 4 points of magic during any action other than maneuvers that can be used immediately. A BULLSEYE icon rolled during a missile action targets an individual unit that must for saves before the targeted army does. The SMITE icon inflicts up to 4 hits on a target army, who cannot save against them and must remove that many health from the army before rolling for saves.

=== Winning the game ===
A player wins by maneuvering two terrains to the 8th face, or through attrition by removing all of an opponent's pieces from the game.

== Publication history ==
In 1993, Wizards of the Coast started a revolution in the games industry with the release of the first collectible card game (CCG), Magic: The Gathering. TSR quickly entered the CCG market in 1994 with Spellfire. The following year, TSR released the collectible dice game Dragon Dice as a part of TSR's 20th anniversary. Game historian Shannon Appelcline noted in his 2014 book Designers & Dragons that Dragon Dice (1995) was at the time "a more innovative approach to the collectible industry" compared to collectible card games such as Spellfire with its collectible dice, each having unique faces that provided different powers.

The first sets of Dragon Dice sold well at games stores, and TSR produced several expansion sets, ultimately creating a total of eight races and several promotional dice for the game. However, interest in Dragon Dice was waning. Appelcline related that by 1996, TSR was struggling financially and the company increased its involvement in the book trade in an attempt to pay off loans and handle its debt, which included "sending massive reorders of Dragon Dice into book stores and increasing hardcover publication from two books a year to twelve. Both of these expansions flopped and because bookstore sales are ultimately returnable, TSR was the one left holding the bag. As 1996 ended Random House informed TSR that they would be returning about a third of TSR's products – several million dollars' worth." TSR ended up with trailer-truckloads full of Dragon Dice being stored in their warehouse. These financial issues quickly led to TSR being bought by Wizards of the Coast (WotC) in 1997.

Shortly after the purchase, WotC released a Dragon Dice "kicker" for a ninth race. This would be WotC's only addition to the Dragon Dice game.

In 2000, on the verge of disposing of a large number of unsold dice into landfill, WotC sold the rights to the game to SFR, Inc. By 2020, SFR had produced five more races — bringing the total to 14 — and completed several sets of promotional dice.

=== Dragon Dice fiction ===
Two short works of fiction accompanied gaming accessories, Tome of the Tarvanehl and Heart of Stone and Flame. The Dice Commander's Manual also included short snippets of fiction as flavor text.

Several full-length paperback novels were written to promote the game:

- In 1996, TSR published Cast of Fate by Allen Varney, a 310-page book that contained a new ivory Dragonslayer die in a hole cut through the pages of the book in the bottom right corner with all text arranged to accommodate the hole.
- TSR planned to publish Army of the Dead by Edo Van Belkom in 1997. It was also supposed to contain a unique die. With the sale of TSR to WotC and WotC's lack of interest in Dragon Dice, publication was shelved indefinitely. WotC eventually returned the rights to Van Belkom at his request, and the book was published in 2003 without a special die by Prime Books.
- A third novel, Time of the Champions by Ed Stark, was advertised by TSR before its demise but was never published.
- Chill Wind by Joseph Joiner was released in 2011, but Joiner passed away prior to releasing a sequel.
- In 2020, SFR partnered with TreeShaker Books to revitalize the literary universe. Cast of Fate was revised and rereleased; this new edition included Tome of the Tarvanehl and Heart of Stone and Flame. It also included Thunderfist and the Dragon which is a prequel to Chill Wind and which utilized flavor text written by Joseph Joiner that had been inserted in the version 3 rules booklet and which was expanded upon by Christopher D. Schmitz to complete the novella.
- In 2020, Treeshaker Books released Rise and Fall of the Obsidian Grotto, and Ashes of Ailushurai, both by Christopher D. Schmitz.
- In 2021, Treeshaker Books released Rise of the Champions by Christopher D. Schmitz and re-released Army of the Dead with Schmitz having revised Van Belkom's original edition and adding roughly 30% new content; Thunderfist and the Dragon was released as a free digital download, and Chill Wind's sequel was released. Eye of the Storm was a cowritten novel by Christopher D. Schmitz and Sherif Guirgas. Tales of the First Age was also released in 2021, which collected the TreeShaker Books editions of Rise and Fall of the Obsidian Grotto, Army of the Dead, and Cast of Fate.
- In 2022 Secrets of the Shadowlands by Christopher D. Schmitz was released; also released was the second omnibus, The Cyrean Songs which collected Chill Wind, Eye of the Storm, and Secrets of the Shadowlands. It also included Thunderfist and the Dragon as a bonus.

=== Videogame ===
A computerized version, Dragon Dice, was published in 1997 by Interplay.

== Reception ==
Arcane published reviews of several editions of Dragon Dice over several issues. In Issue 1, Steve Faragher rated the original game an excellent 9 out of 10, saying, " this really is a superb game. The strategies available are virtually limitless and, in common with other great games, it's hard to imagine two conflicts ever being the same." In Issue 5, Faragher rated the Monsters & Amazons expansion set a disappointing 6 out of 10, commenting, ""So, interesting new dice but frankly not enough of them." In Issue 7, Chris Baylis rated the Firewalkers expansion set an above-average 8 out of 10, calling them "much better balanced, in terms of dice variation as well as distribution, than the Amazons, particularly for a single-colour army." Chris Baylis reviewed the Undead expansion set for Arcane magazine, rating it an 8 out of 10 overall, and stated that "The dice inside Undead do not match the colouring on the cover which is a shame because black and white tends to be ideal for Ghouls, Ghosts, Vampires, Death Knights and their 'dead' comrades. However, the charcoal grey, black-tinged background of the dice sets off their fluorescent green icons, making them the most legible of the Dragon Dice armies to date. Undead adds the Vanish, Convert, Scare, Slay, Stun, Plague and Wither icons to the game as well as introducing the rare Vampire. Undead can also take 'stepped damage' (when killed units are traded in for lower points units), but because they are slow they can't charge into battle (unless under a Restless Dead spell)." In Issue 11, Baylis rated the Dragon Dice: Battle Box an average 7 out of 10, calling it well designed, but noting "The only problems are the random assortment of dice - a fixed selection would have made things more playable - and the fact that the full rules refer to a couple of things that aren't actually in the box, which can be annoying."

Chris Baylis reviewed The Feral for Arcane magazine, rating it an 8 out of 10 overall, and stated that "I believe that the Feral are better suited to complementing a spellcasting army by giving it increased speed and strength, than for creating a complete force of their own kind. However, you can certainly have an amusing three-race army by mixing Feral, Undead and Firewalkers together. They aren't particularly successful against well-planned armies in small (50 point and lower) battles, but nevertheless, they are extremely enjoyable to use in larger army combats."

Chris Baylis reviewed Magestorm! for Arcane magazine, rating it a 9 out of 10 overall, and stated that "Magestorm! is an excellent product and of gaming value to all Dragon Dice players, embellishing whatever racial or inter-racial army they possess." Chris Baylis reviewed Swamp Stalkers for Arcane magazine, rating it a 5 out of 10 overall, and stated that "My view is that Dragon Dice has almost run its natural course because the designers appear to be running out of ideas for different effects, or at least effects that cause interesting possibilities. Each Kicker Pack now seems to be aimed at quietening the specialities of the previous one, and rather than keeping the gameplay short, fast and simple, player's armies are becoming greater in volume to allow for the character and monster combinations from each set to be included."

== Awards ==
At the 1996 Origins Awards, Dragon Dice won for "Best Fantasy or Science-Fiction Board Game of 1995."

== Reviews ==
- Backstab #2 (Swamp Stalkers)
- Backstab #5
- Rollespilsmagasinet Fønix (Danish) (Issue 11 - Dec/Jan 1995)
- InQuest, Issue 7, November 1995
- Australian Realms #27
- Realms of Fantasy
- Dragão Brasil #15

== See also ==
- Game design
