= Edward Byam =

Edward Byam (1663/4 – December 1741) was the Governor of Leeward Islands in 1715 and Lieutenant Governor of Antigua between 1715 – 4 December 1741.

== Biography ==
He was born between 1662 and 1664 in Suriname. He was the youngest son of William Byam, a Lieutenant General, and Dorothy Knollys. In 1707 he was president of Council of Antigua. In 1715, Byam was appointed Governor of Leeward Islands and Lieutenant Governor of Antigua, an office he occupied until 4 December 1741, the day of his death.

He married Mary Winthrope and they had two children: Edward Byam, and Mary Byam. Later, he married, again, with Lydia Thomas, the widow of Major Samuel Martin, on 22 July 1703 in Antigua and they had five children: George Byam, William Byam, Francis Byam, Alice Byam and Lydia Byam. All them were born in Antigua, except Francis Byam (who was born in St. Vincent Island). The descendants of Edward Byam, such as great granddaughter Lydia Byam, were well-established on Antigua.
