= Lester W. Smith =

Role-playing game designer

- Occupations: Game designer, educational writer
- Years active: 1984–present
- Known for: Dragon Dice
- Website: lestersmith.com

Lester W. Smith is a game designer who has worked primarily on role-playing games.

== Career ==
=== Early work and GDW ===
Lester Smith began his game-design career in 1984 with Mind Duel, a science-fiction board game submission to Space Gamer magazine. In 1985, he joined the staff at Game Designers' Workshop. Marc Miller, Frank Chadwick, Lester Smith, and Timothy Brown of GDW designed the new game Traveller: 2300 (1986) as an expansion of the original Traveller role-playing game. He designed the Temple of the Beastmen board game. Smith designed the role-playing game Dark Conspiracy (1991) which used the new GDW "house system" of rules originally created for the second edition of Twilight: 2000. Smith designed the Minion Hunter board game.

=== TSR and Dragon Dice ===
Smith later left GDW to work for TSR. He was hired by TSR in 1991, and contributed to the AD&D and Amazing Engine role-playing game lines. Smith and Wolfgang Baur co-designed the Planes of Chaos boxed set. He designed the Origins Award-winning Dragon Dice. Smith designed Chaos Progenitus (1996), also marketed as Demon Dice. Smith then worked for Imperium Games. Smith later worked for Archangel Entertainment, and then helped Don Perrin design the Sovereign Stone role-playing game. He has also done work for FASA, Flying Buffalo, West End Games, and others, acquiring two other Origins Awards in the process. Along with Timothy Brown, James Ward, John Danovich, and Sean Everette, Smith co-founded the d20 company Fast Forward Entertainment.

=== Later work ===
Smith worked as an educational writer and technologist for a Houghton Mifflin design house and for a time served as the president of the Wisconsin Fellowship of Poets. As of 2018, Smith is officially retired. Since 2011, Smith has launched 13 successful funded campaigns on the crowdfunding platform kickstarter. These projects include books, role-playing games and card games that Smith has designed himself.

== Personal life ==
Lester Smith is an alumnus of Illinois State University. He married his wife Jennifer and they had four daughters together. In 2015, Smith and his wife moved to Loma, Nebraska to live closer to family.
