= Traveller Alien Module 7: Hivers =

Science-fiction role-playing game

Alien Module 7: Hivers
Encounters with the Manipulators
- Cover art by Steve Venters, 1986
- Designers: J. Andrew Keith; Marc W. Miller; Loren Wiseman
- Publishers: Game Designers' Workshop
- Publication: 1986
- Genres: Science-fiction
- Systems: Classic Traveller

Traveller Alien Module 7: Hivers is a supplement published by Game Designers' Workshop (GDW) in 1986 for the science fiction role-playing game Traveller.

== Contents ==
Continuing in GDW's Alien Modules series, Traveller Alien Module 7: Hivers details the alien race known as the Hiver manipulators. Topics include physiology, society, psychology, political structure, history, how to generate a Hiver character, weapons, and ships. The book also includes an adventure, "Something Stinks!"

== Publication history ==
GDW first published the science fiction role-playing game Traveller in 1977, and followed that with dozens of supplements and adventures, including a multipart Alien Modules series, each focussed on a different alien race: 1: Aslan (1984), 2: K'kree (1984), 3: Vargr (1984), 4: Zhodani (1985), 5: Droyne (1985), and 6: Solomani.

In 1986, the series continued with 7: Hivers, a 48-page book written by J. Andrew Keith, Marc W. Miller, and Loren Wiseman, with interior art by Bryan Gibson and Steve Venters, and cover art by Venters. It is considered one of the classic Traveller Modules series.

In 1987, GDW followed 7: Hivers with a final addition to the Alien Module series, 8: Darrians.

== Reception ==
Jim Bambra reviewed Traveller Alien Module 7: Hivers for White Dwarf #84, and stated that "Hivers is yet another valuable and impressive addition to the Traveller universe."

In his 1990 book The Complete Guide to Role-Playing Games, game critic Rick Swan called this one of the best Traveller expansions, and especially recommended it.

== Other reviews ==
- The Imperium Staple, Issue 6 (Aug 1986, p.14)

== See also ==
List of Classic Traveller Alien Modules
