= Fate of the Sky Raiders =

Science-fiction role-playing game supplement

- Designers: J. Andrew Keith; William H. Keith Jr.
- Publishers: FASA
- Publication: 1982; 43 years ago
- Genres: Science fiction
- Systems: Classic Traveller

Fate of the Sky Raiders is a 1982 role-playing game adventure for Traveller published by FASA.

== Plot summary ==
Fate of the Sky Raiders is the conclusion of the saga that began in the adventures Legend of the Sky Raiders and Trail of the Sky Raiders, in which the player characters finally encounter the legendary Sky Raiders and learn their fate.

== Publication history ==
Fate of the Sky Raiders was written by J. Andrew Keith and William H. Keith Jr. and was published in 1982 by FASA as a digest-sized 60-page book with a two-color map.

== Reception ==
William A. Barton reviewed Fate of the Sky Raiders in The Space Gamer No. 60. Barton commented that "even though Trail remains my personal favorite of the trilogy, Fate of the Sky Raiders is a thorough piece of work and should satisfy most referees and players as a fitting conclusion to the saga of the Sky Raiders."

Tony Watson reviewed Fate of the Sky Raiders for Different Worlds magazine and stated that "Despite [its] errors, Fate of the Sky Raiders is a good adventure, and that is the main consideration. Those Traveller players who have come this far with the 'Sky Raiders' epic will not be disappointed with its final chapter."

In a retrospective review of The Trail of the Sky Raiders in Black Gate, Patrick Kanouse said "The Sky Raiders trilogy is a classic Traveller adventure that highlights much of the joy of this game: exploration, problem-solving, random encounters, adventure, and the occasional fight. The Keith brothers delivered an excellent ode to Indiana Jones and crafted a playable, exciting adventure in the far future."
