= Alien Realms =

Science-fiction role-playing game

- Cover art by David Deitrick, 1983
- Designers: Timothy B. Brown; J. Andrew Keith
- Publishers: Game Designers' Workshop
- Publication: 1983; 42 years ago
- Genres: Science-fiction
- Systems: Classic Traveller

Alien Realms is an anthology of adventures published by Game Designers' Workshop (GDW) in 1983 for the science fiction role-playing game Traveller.

== Description ==
Alien Realms is a collection of eight adventures that are based on material about alien races published by GDW in their Alien Modules series: Traveller Alien Module 1: Aslan (1984), Traveller Alien Module 2: K'kree (1984), Traveller Alien Module 3: Vargr (1984), Traveller Alien Module 4: Zhodani (1985), and Traveller Alien Module 5: Droyne (1985). In some of the adventures, player characters are humans interacting with the alien race, in others, they are an alien race.

The eight adventures and the alien races featured in each of them are:

- "The Last Patrol" (Zhodani)
- "Deep Metal" (Zhodani)
- "Prosperity for the Taking" (Vargr)
- "No Credit Check" (Vargr & Zhodani)
- "First Son, Lost Son" (Aslan)
- "Interdiction Zone" (Aslan)
- "Ahriy Uprising" (Aslan)
- "The Casteless" (Droyne)

== Publication history ==
GDW first published the science fiction role-playing game Traveller in 1977, and followed that with dozens of supplements and adventures. Alien Realms, a 48-page book published in 1983, was written by Timothy B. Brown and J. Andrew Keith, with cover art by David Deitrick. It is considered one of the classic Traveller Modules series.

== Reception ==
Jim Bambra reviewed Alien Realms for White Dwarf #84, and stated that "This module is highly recommended to referees and players interested in new roleplaying experiences. If you are looking for some ideas with what can be done with alien characters, Alien Realms has plenty of suggestions."

== Other reviews ==
- The Imperium Staple, Issue 6 (Aug 1986, p.14)

== See also ==
- Classic Traveller Modules
