= Cause for War =

Cause for War is a 1986 role-playing game adventure published by Fantasy Games Unlimited for Psi World.

== Plot summary ==
Cause for War is an adventure in which two adventure scenarios are presented.

== Publication history ==
Cause for War was written by J. Andrew Keith with art by William H. Keith Jr., and was published by Fantasy Games Unlimited in 1986 as a 28-page book.

It is the sequel to Underground Railroad.
