= Kafer Dawn =

Science fiction tabletop role-playing game supplement

The Frontline of Mankind's Fight for Survival
- Cover by Steve Venters
- Designers: William H. Keith Jr.
- Publishers: Game Designers' Workshop
- Publication: 1987; 39 years ago
- Genres: Hard science fiction
- Systems: Custom
- ISBN: 0-943580-21-8

Kafer Dawn, subtitled "The Frontline of Mankind's Fight for Survival", is a supplement published by Game Designers' Workshop (GDW) in 1987 for the hard science fiction role-playing game 2300 AD.

== Contents ==
Kafer Dawn is set on the world of Aurore, a habitable moon of a gas giant. Aurore is where humanity first encountered the alien invaders known as Kafers. Now the Kafers have infested Aurore's soil with a biological rot. The book contains four adventures:

1. Waiting for the Cavalry
2. On the Slopes of Mt. Phaeton
3. Peace Quest
4. Thunder Valley

Other story hooks are provided, as well as more information about the planetary system, Aurore and the Kafers.

== Publication history ==
GDW published Traveller 2300 in 1986, quickly retitled 2300 AD to prevent confusion with GDW's previous space opera role-playing game Traveller. The following year, GDW introduced a major plotline for the game, the "Kafer War", as humanity encounters an aggressive space-travelling alien species. The first adventure in this storyline was 1987's Kafer Dawn, a 48-page softcover book written by William H. Keith Jr., with interior art by Dan Penosian and Steve Venters and cover art by Venters. The information about the Kafers and Aurore was reprinted in the Kafer Sourcebook (1987) and Aurore Sourcebook (1987).

== Reception ==
In Issue 145 of Dragon (May 1989), Jim Bambra thought this adventure was "the weakest of the Kafer War products", pointing out that all of the planetary information about Aurore and the Kafers had been reprinted in other supplements, leaving the four adventure scenarios as the only reason to purchase this product.

== Other reviews ==
- Tidewater Traveller Times Volume 1, Issue 2 (July 1987, p. 3)
- G.M. The Independent Fantasy Roleplaying Magazine #2

== Other recognition ==
A copy of Kafer Dawn is held in the Merril Collection of Science Fiction, Speculation, and Fantasy at the Toronto Public Library (call #RPG TRA KAF).
