= Underground Railroad (Psi World) =

Underground Railroad is a 1985 role-playing game adventure published by Fantasy Games Unlimited for Psi World.

== Plot summary ==
Underground Railroad is an adventure in which three adventure scenarios are presented.

== Publication history ==
Underground Railroad was written by J. Andrew Keith and William H. Keith Jr., and was published by Fantasy Games Unlimited in 1985 as a 32-page book.

Cause for War is the sequel.

== Reviews ==
- Comics Feature #46
