= Uragyad'n of the Seven Pillars =

Science-fiction role-playing game supplement

- Designers: J. Andrew Keith; William H. Keith Jr.
- Publishers: FASA
- Publication: 1981; 44 years ago
- Genres: Science fiction
- Systems: Classic Traveller

Uragyad'n of the Seven Pillars is a 1981 role-playing game adventure for Traveller published by FASA.

== Plot summary ==
Uragyad'n of the Seven Pillars is adventure in which a hired mercenary band tries to lead the native nomadic N'raqah tribes of the tidal-locked planet Vahjdi to rebel against the Talaki invaders from another planet in the Far Frontiers sector.

== Publication history ==
Uragyad'n of the Seven Pillars was written by J. Andrew Keith and William H. Keith Jr., and was published in 1981 by FASA as a digest-sized 48-page book with a two-color map.

== Reception ==
William A. Barton reviewed Uragyad'n of the Seven Pillars in The Space Gamer No. 49. Barton commented that "Overall, Uragyad'n of the Seven Pillars is an excellent offering that should provide hours of entertainment and adventure to Traveller players. I recommend it highly."

Bob McWilliams reviewed Uragyad'n of the Seven Pillars for White Dwarf #31, giving it an overall rating of 8 out of 10, and stated that "Well produced and with plenty going on, the designers have provided referees with as much help as can be fitted in booklets of this size, gone into detail at points in the adventure where it's necessary and not filled out with 'chrome'."

Tony Watson reviewed Uragyad'n of the Seven Pillars for Different Worlds magazine and stated that "Seven Pillars is a fine example of how a short campaign for mercenary-type characters should be set up and run. This is an interesting situation for the characters to be involved with, a confrontation with a solid and sensible background and definite goals. Action won't (or shouldn't if the adventure is used properly) occur randomly or without reason. The thought put into the engagement resolution system and the organization of activities pays off; a campaign setting that could easily get out of hand and become difficult to run remains manageable without losing any of its operational or tactical feel. If your Traveller campaign has a few mercenary players, this adventure should serve nicely, not only as a fascinating scenario in its own right, but as an excellent model for structuring similar situations."
