= Duneraiders =

Science-fiction role-playing game supplement

- Cover by William H. Keith
- Designers: J. Andrew Keith
- Publishers: Gamelords
- Publication: 1984
- Genres: Science-fiction
- Systems: Classic Traveller

Duneraiders is a 1984 science-fiction role-playing game adventure published by Gamelords for Traveller.

== Plot summary ==
Duneraiders is an adventure on a desert world called Tashrakaar and involves competing off-world mining companies. It utilized the rules from The Desert Environment by the same author.

== Publication history ==
Duneraiders was written by William H. Keith Jr. and was published in 1984 by Gamelords as a digest-sized 60-page book.

== Reception ==
Tony Watson reviewed Duneraiders in Space Gamer No. 72. Watson commented that "The scenario in Duneraiders is a good one, backed up by some interesting detail and local color. There's a good feeling for adventure in the dry wastes of the deep desert, and just about any playing group should find the situation challenging."

Steve Nutt reviewed Duneraiders for Imagine magazine, and stated that "The adventure is well presented and laid out, and is comprehensive. The planetary background is detailed. with lots of maps and a deck plan of the mining vehicle provided. At all points of the adventure the referee has all the information needed; this is rare nowadays, with so many scenarios needing work on them before they can be played."

Arlen P. Walker reviewed Duneraiders for Different Worlds magazine and stated that "Duneraiders is fairly easy to use with other systems, but I would not recommend it for anyone who wants to buy a full-blown desert adventure. Nothing in this book can hold a candle to Uragyad'n of the Seven Pillars from FASA, for example. But there are some good ideas for desert encounters and smaller scale adventures which might justify the purchase."
