= Salvage Mission =

Science-fiction role-playing game supplement

- Cover by William H. Keith Jr.
- Designers: J. Andrew Keith
- Publishers: Marischal Adventures
- Publication: 1981; 44 years ago
- Genres: Science fiction
- Systems: Classic Traveller

Salvage Mission is a 1981 role-playing game adventure published by Marischal Adventures for Traveller.

== Plot summary ==
Salvage Mission is the third folio adventure from Marishcal Adventures, and involves searching for a disabled transport lost in an attack.

== Publication history ==
Salvage Mission was written by J. Andrew Keith, with art by William H. Keith Jr., and was published in 1981 by Marischal Adventures as a 4-page pamphlet; a second edition was published in 1987 by Seeker.

== Reception ==
Tony Watson reviewed Flight of the Stag, Salvage Mission, and Fleetwatch for Different Worlds magazine and stated that "I was very impressed with Marischal's folios. They are well conceived, intelligent and excellently illustrated. They should prove useful as short adventures or as starting points for more complex scenarios. These folios seem to be a product at the right price."

William A. Barton reviewed Salvage Mission in The Space Gamer No. 48. Barton commented that "Overall, Salvage Mission is a worthy companion to the other Marishcal Adventures. I look forward to more adventures in this series."
