= Flight of the Stag =

Science-fiction role-playing game supplement

- Cover by William H. Keith Jr.
- Designers: J. Andrew Keith
- Publishers: Marischal Adventures
- Publication: 1981; 44 years ago
- Genres: Science fiction
- Systems: Classic Traveller

Flight of the Stag is a 1981 role-playing game adventure published by Marischal Adventures for Traveller.

== Plot summary ==
Flight of the Stag is the first of Marishcal's folio adventures, and involves the Gazelle-class close escort ship Stag and its crew as part of the Fifth Frontier War.

== Publication history ==
Flight of the Stag was written by J. Andrew Keith, with art by William H. Keith Jr., and was published in 1981 by Marischal Adventures as a 4-page pamphlet; a second edition was published in 1986 by Seeker.

== Reception ==
William A. Barton reviewed Flight of the Stag in The Space Gamer No. 46. Barton commented that "I highly recommend Flight of the Stag as an excellent example of a brief, simple, yet highly playable adventure for Traveller."

Tony Watson reviewed Flight of the Stag, Salvage Mission, and Fleetwatch for Different Worlds magazine and stated that "I was very impressed with Marischal's folios. They are well conceived, intelligent and excellently illustrated. They should prove useful as short adventures or as starting points for more complex scenarios. These folios seem to be a product at the right price."
