= Fleetwatch =

Science-fiction role-playing game supplement

- Designers: William H. Keith Jr.
- Publishers: Marischal Adventures
- Publication: 1981; 44 years ago
- Genres: Science fiction
- Systems: Classic Traveller

Fleetwatch is a 1981 role-playing game adventure for Traveller published by Marischal Adventures.

== Plot summary ==
Fleetwatch is the second in series of adventures focusing on the close escort ship the Stag, and takes place during the Fifth Frontier War.

== Publication history ==
Fleetwatch was written by William H. Keith Jr. and was published in 1981 by Marischal Adventures as a 4-page pamphlet; a second edition was published in 1986 by Seeker.

== Reception ==
Tony Watson reviewed Flight of the Stag, Salvage Mission, and Fleetwatch for Different Worlds magazine and stated that "I was very impressed with Marischal's folios. They are well conceived, intelligent and excellently illustrated. They should prove useful as short adventures or as starting points for more complex scenarios. These folios seem to be a product at the right price."

William A. Barton reviewed Fleetwatch in The Space Gamer No. 47. Barton commented that "Fleetwatch, like Flight of the Stag, is an excellent Traveller offering."
