= A Pilot's Guide to the Drexilthar Subsector =

Science-fiction role-playing game supplement

- Cover by William H. Keith
- Designers: J. Andrew Keith
- Publishers: Gamelords
- Publication: 1984
- Genres: Science-fiction
- Systems: Classic Traveller

A Pilot's Guide to the Drexilthar Subsector is a 1984 role-playing game supplement, written by J. Andrew Keith for Traveller published by Gamelords.

== Contents ==
A Pilot's Guide to the Drexilthar Subsector is a supplement that details a single subsector in the Reavers' Deep sector.

== Publication history ==
A Pilot's Guide to the Drexilthar Subsector was written by J. Andrew Keith, with art by William H. Keith Jr., and was published in 1984 by Gamelords as a digest-sized 48-page book.

== Reception ==
Stephen Nutt reviewed A Pilots Guide to the Drexilthar Sector for Imagine magazine, and stated that "it is well produced and what it contains is good, sensible stuff. Pilots Guide is a welcome addition to any Traveller collection. It will be of use to the beginner and the veteran alike."

William A. Barton reviewed A Pilot's Guide to the Drexilthar Subsector in The Space Gamer No. 72. Barton commented that "if you're tired of the worlds of the Spinward Marches or the Solomani Rim and haven't created your own subsector for adventure, you might find A Pilot's Guide to the Drexilthar Subsector your key to an interesting place to hang your vacc-suit helmet."

Tony Watson reviewed A Pilot's Guide to the Drexilthar Subsector for Different Worlds magazine and stated that "Even if a gamemaster's campaign isn't set in the Drexilthar Subsector, information in the Guide could prove useful in generating worlds within that gamemaster's universe. For the fledging campaign, this is an excellent source of predescribed worlds; an entire subsector is mapped and explained for the gamemaster who doesn't have the time or inclination to do so himself. Moreover, there is the added benefit of adventure books available from Gamelords that are set in this area of space, with more promised to appear in the near future. A Pilot's Guide to the Drexilthar Subsector is worth consideration by any Traveller gamemaster."
