= Startown Liberty =

Science-fiction role-playing game supplement

- Cover by William H. Keith
- Designers: J. Andrew Keith
- Publishers: Game Designers' Workshop
- Publication: 1984; 41 years ago
- Genres: Science-fiction
- Systems: Classic Traveller

Startown Liberty is a 1984 role-playing game supplement, written by J. Andrew Keith under the pen-name of John Marshal for Traveller published by Gamelords.

== Contents ==
Startown Liberty is a supplement which provides encounters and events to take place in the area near the starport of a world.

== Publication history ==
Startown Liberty was written by John Marshal, with art by William H. Keith Jr., and was published in 1984 by Gamelords as a digest-sized 48-page book.

== Reception ==
Stephen Nutt reviewed Startown Liberty for Imagine magazine, and stated that "Startown liberty is not a full scenario, it is a play-aid. As such it is really useful to a referee and it can be used over and over again."

Tony Watson reviewed Startown Liberty for Different Worlds magazine and stated that "Given the ubiquitous presence of Startowns around starports, the fascination they hold for player-character, and their utility as a place to start or continue an adventure, Startown Liberty is a useful supplement indeed. As the designer suggests, the encounters listed in the book can be used as red herrings, a means to interject an important bit of information into the course of a scenario, or as the starting point of a new adventure. Just as important, Startown Liberty serves as a tool to provide a little 'local color' to a playing session, giving the players a true feel for a 'wretched hive of scum and villainy.'"

Tony Watson reviewed Startown Liberty in The Space Gamer No. 72. Watson commented that "Startown Liberty is a fine way to provide a playing group with diversion, red herrings, or a necessary contact."

== Reviews ==
- Polyhedron #75
