= Invasion (2300 AD) =

Science fiction tabletop role-playing game supplement

The Future of Humanity Hangs in the Balance
- Cover by Steve Venters, 1988
- Designers: J. Andrew Keith
- Publishers: Game Designers' Workshop
- Publication: 1988; 38 years ago
- Genres: Science fiction

Invasion is a supplement published by Game Designers' Workshop (GDW) in 1988 for the science fiction tabletop role-playing game 2300 AD.

== Contents ==
In the first edition of 2300 A.D. role-playing game (titled Traveller 2300), the alien Kafers invaded one of the human-dominated worlds. In the second edition, the Kafer threat has become a galactic problem. Invasion is a campaign setting that describes how deadly Kafer fleets break out in 2301 A.D. and threaten all of humanity. The book includes:

- descriptions of each world invaded by the Kafers, tracking the progress of the Kafers through each system via news reports.
- the location of human fleets
- specifications of the Kafer ships that can be used with the space combat rules from Star Cruiser
- individual system and world maps
- encounter tables for the Kafer forces likely to be encountered by the player characters
- details of how a space-oriented campaign can be designed
- Kafer equipment

The book includes a scenario for each system being invaded, allowing the gamemaster to put together an entire campaign for the players as the invasion progresses. As reviewer Jim Bambra noted, "Invasion is not designed to let any one party of adventures win the war [...] This doesn’t mean that PCs are wasting their time, but that the Kafer threat is so huge that only a concerted effort by the nations of Earth can hope to defeat them."

== Publication history ==
GDW created their popular space opera role-playing game Traveller in 1977. A decade later, wanting to create a game with a more hard science fiction feel, GDW published Traveller 2300, and in 1988 published a second edition retitled 2300 AD. As part of the updated storyline, GDW published Invasion the same year, a 72-page perfect bound book written by J. Andrew Keith and developed by Lester W. Smith, with interior art by A.C. Farley, Liz Danforth, and Bryan Gibson, and cover art by Steve Venters.

== Reception ==
In the May 1989 edition of Dragon (Issue #145), Jim Bambra thought this was an extremely strong work, saying, "Invasion makes for an ideal continuation of the struggle against the Kafers. [...] When it comes to creating an exciting and believable universe, Invasion succeeds admirably." He concluded, "Invasion is highly recommended as a model of how to design epic struggles and as a brilliant background to a 2300 AD game campaign."
