= Traveller Adventure 9: Nomads of the World-Ocean =

Science-fiction role-playing game supplement

Traveller Adventure 9
Nomads of the World-Ocean
- Designers: J. Andrew Keith; William H. Keith Jr.
- Publishers: Game Designers' Workshop
- Publication: 1983; 42 years ago
- Genres: Science fiction
- Systems: Classic Traveller

Traveller Adventure 9: Nomads of the World-Ocean is a 1983 role-playing game adventure for Traveller, written by J. Andrew Keith and William H. Keith Jr., published by Game Designers' Workshop. Nomads of the World-Ocean deals with attempts to gather evidence of corporate wrongdoing on an ocean-covered world.

== Plot summary ==
Nomads of the World-Ocean is an adventure in which the player characters investigate the illegal slaughter of the huge sea creatures on a waterworld, allegedly perpetrated by a megacorporation subsidiary.

== Reception ==
William A. Barton reviewed Nomads of the World-Ocean in Space Gamer No. 65. Barton commented that "Overall, if you don't mind the duplication of theme from the earlier work, Nomads could be a worthwhile buy if you're interested in a waterworld and don't have the time or inclination to work it out on your own, or are simply interested in the possibilities of sea hunts with hunterfoil-type vessels."

Andy Slack reviewed Adventure 9: Nomads of the World-Ocean for White Dwarf #49, giving it an overall rating of 9 out of 10, and stated that "If the adventurers can be properly guided into the scenario, it is superb stuff and will last up to a game year or so. The Brothers Keith have their faults, but they can make a world live like no-one else."

Jim Bambra reviewed Adventure 9 – Nomads of the World Ocean for Imagine magazine, and stated that "Nomads is an excellent piece of work: it has intrigue, action, role-playing and a wealth of background. This world has been well developed; there is none of the sketchiness common to many Traveller worlds."

Tony Watson reviewed Nomads of the World-Ocean for Different Worlds magazine and stated that "Overall [...] Nomads of the World-Ocean is a fast-paced, imaginative adventure for Traveller and certainly ranks among the best to appear from GDW. It manages to effectively combine action with a meaningful social purpose."

== See also ==
- Classic Traveller adventures
