= Colonial Atlas =

Role playing game supplement

Colonial Atlas is a supplement published by Game Designers' Workshop in 1988 for the science fiction role-playing game 2300 AD.

== Publication history ==
Colonial Atlas is a 96-page book developed by Rob Caswell, Deb Ziegler, and Timothy B. Brown, with additional submissions by Loren K. Wiseman, J. Andrew Keith, Tom Peters, Lester W. Smith, Gary L. Thomas, Bob Swarm, Marc W. Miller, Matt Renner, Mike Dane, Robert and Nancy Parker, and Bill Connors. Cover art was by Steve Venters.

== Contents ==
Colonial Atlas is a campaign setting which includes information on all 29 colonized worlds of the 2300 AD setting, with details on the star system, each planet, colonial history, resources, wildlife and government of each. The book also includes story ideas for each world.

== Reception ==
In the May 1989 edition of Dragon (Issue 145), Jim Bambra said "Each colony seems real; the colonists face believable dangers and economic and political problems in their day-to-day struggles to maintain human life on the worlds of the frontier." He did note the absence of planetary and system maps, saying, "All you get are star maps of the three arms, which are useful but are only part of the story. As most adventures take place on the worlds of each system, maps showing the physical layout of each planet would have made a welcome addition and greatly enhanced an already impressive product." Bambra concluded that this book was "a very worthwhile purchase to anyone interested in the 2300 AD game. It shows the great potential for adventures set in this period of Earth's future history, and it clearly shows the extent of each nation's colonial presence. This is a product that no fan of the 2300 AD game should be without."
