= BeltStrike: Riches and Danger in the Bowman Belt =

Science-fiction role-playing game supplement

BeltStrike
- Cover by David Deitrick.
- Designers: J. Andrew Keith
- Publishers: Game Designers' Workshop
- Publication: 1984
- Genres: Science-fiction
- Systems: Classic Traveller

BeltStrike: Riches and Danger in the Bowman Belt is a 1984 tabletop role-playing game adventure, written by J. Andrew Keith, with a cover by David Deitrick for Traveller published by Game Designers' Workshop. One of the classic Traveller Modules series.

== Plot summary ==
BeltStrike: Riches and Danger in the Bowman Belt describes history and geography of the Bowman asteroid system and its mining, located in District 268 as part of the Spinward Marches.

== Publication history ==
BeltStrike: Riches and Danger in the Bowman Belt was the second release in a series of boxed set adventure modules for Traveller.

== Reception ==
In the July–August 1984 edition of Space Gamer (No. 70), Craig Sheeley gave a strong recommendation, saying, "Buy Beltstrike. Where Tarsus was understandably limited, Beltstrike has information applicable anywhere men and aliens mine asteroids." Sheeley

In the January–February 1985 edition of Different Worlds (Issue #38), Tony Watson gave this book an average 2.5 stars out of 4, and pointed out that issues were not with the content but with the formatting and booklet size used, as well with as the high price charged. He concluded, "As usual. GDW has produced an attractive and well-written play-aid for Traveller; it is unfortunate that in this case that play-aid is inappropriately formatted and certainly too expensive."

== Reviews ==
- Analog Science Fiction and Fact

== See also ==
- Classic Traveller Modules
