= The Drenslaar Quest =

Science-fiction role-playing game supplement

- Cover by William H. Keith
- Designers: J. Andrew Keith; William H. Keith
- Publishers: Game Designers' Workshop
- Publication: 1983
- Genres: Science-fiction
- Systems: Classic Traveller

The Drenslaar Quest is an adventure, written by J. Andrew Keith, and William H. Keith, and published under license by Gamelords in 1983 for Game Designer's Workshop's science fiction role-playing game Traveller. It utilized the rules from The Undersea Environment by the same author.

== Plot summary ==
The Drenslaar Quest is an adventure in which the player characters are approached by a representative from the world of Ildrissar which is rebelling against its government, to salvage the cargo of the starship Drenslaar, which lies at the bottom of an ocean on the watery world of Yarfahl. The characters will have to first locate the ship, and then safely recover its cargo for the rebels.

Because of the specific set of diving and salvage skills needed to complete this adventure, pregenerated characters are provided for the players.

== Publication history ==
The Drenslaar Quest was written William H. Keith Jr., and was published in 1983 by Gamelords as a digest-sized 60-page book. The Drenslaar Quest was written by William H. Keith Jr., who also produced the illustrations. Cartography and ship plans were created by Larry Shade, K. B. Jacks, and Janet Trautvetter. Gamelords published the 60-page book under a licensing agreement with Game Designer's Workshop, the original creators of Traveller. It was republished in by Far Future Enterprises in 2010.

== Reception ==
Stephen Nutt reviewed The Drenslaar Quest for Imagine magazine, and stated that "It is well designed and superbly illustrated. The ship will continue to be a game-aid long after the players have finished Quest - a well presented and superbly conceived adventure. Top marks to the designer."

Tony Watson reviewed The Drenslaar Quest in Space Gamer No. 72. Watson commented that "The adventure is very complete, including deck plans for the Drenslaar as well as Yarfahlian ocean craft. The animal descriptions are particularly good."

In the January–February 1985 edition of Different Worlds (Issue #38), William Barton gave it a top rating of 4 stars out of 4, saying, "Even though its price is $2 more than the average GDW adventure, this scenario - well worth the extra cost - underscores the fact that the best Traveller adventures are still coming from the licensees. Definitely recommended."
