= The Inheritance Trilogy =

The Inheritance Trilogy may refer to:

- The Inheritance Cycle, a fantasy series written by Christopher Paolini
- The Inheritance Trilogy (Douglas series), a science fiction series written by Ian Douglas
- The Inheritance Trilogy (Jemisin series), a fantasy series written by N. K. Jemisin
