= Traveller Alien Module 6: Solomani =

Science-fiction role-playing game

Alien Module 6: Solomani
Self-Proclaimed Champions of Human Supremacy
- Cover art by David Deitrick
- Designers: John Harshman; Marc W. Miller
- Publishers: Game Designers' Workshop
- Publication: 1986; 39 years ago
- Genres: Science-fiction
- Systems: Classic Traveller

Traveller Alien Module 6: Solomani is a supplement published by Game Designers' Workshop (GDW) in 1986 for the science fiction role-playing game Traveller.

== Description ==
This book details the Solomani Confederation and includes:

- its history
- its political system
- how to create Solomani characters
- new rules for adventures set in the Solomani Rim
- updated rules for mercenaries, Army and Navy.
- Universal Planetary Profiles for hundreds of worlds within the Solomani sector.
- A large map of the sector
- a short four-page adventure, "The Lost Colony"

== Publication history ==
GDW first published Traveller in 1977, and followed this with dozens of supplements and adventures, including a series of supplements about aliens. Traveller Alien Module 6: Solomani is the sixth book in this series, a 48-page book by John Harshman and Marc W. Miller, with additional material by J. Andrew Keith and Rob Toy, interior art by William H. Keith Jr. and Steve Venters, and cover art by Dave Dietrick.

== Reception ==
Jim Bambra reviewed Traveller Alien Module 6: Solomani for White Dwarf #84, and stated that "Like previous alien modules, Solomani vividly recreates an alien society; it's a must for any campaign set in or near the Solomani Confederation."

In his 1990 book The Complete Guide to Role-Playing Games, game critic Rick Swan called this one of the best Traveller expansions, and especially recommended it.

== Other reviews ==
- The Imperium Staple, Issue #2 (Apr 1986, p.12)

== See also ==
- List of Classic Traveller Alien Modules
- Traveller Supplement 10: The Solomani Rim
