= Wanted: Adventurers =

Science-fiction role-playing game supplement

- Cover by William H. Keith
- Designers: J. Andrew Keith
- Publishers: Game Designers' Workshop
- Publication: 1984; 41 years ago
- Genres: Science-fiction
- Systems: Classic Traveller

Wanted: Adventurers is a 1984 role-playing game supplement, written by J. Andrew Keith under the pen-name of John Marshal for Traveller published by Gamelords.

== Contents ==
Wanted: Adventurers is a book containing short adventure scenarios.

== Publication history ==
Wanted: Adventurers was written by John Marshal, and was published in 1984 by Gamelords as a digest-sized 48-page book.

== Reception ==
Stephen Nutt reviewed Wanted: Adventurers for Imagine magazine, and stated that "The scenarios contained in this play aid are only skeletons. yet it gives depth to the referee's campaigns and allows off-the-cuff activity in play sessions."

William A. Barton reviewed Wanted: Adventurers in Space Gamer No. 72. Barton commented that "Most of the scenarios outlined in Wanted: Adventurers are intriguing hooks that a clever referee can turn into exciting adventure situations."

Arlen P. Walker reviewed Wanted: Adventurers for Different Worlds magazine and stated that "If you're after a 'read 'em and run 'em'-style adventure, pass this book by. On the other hand, if what you're after is a book of ideas which can fit into almost any campaign without a great deal of effort, this book is definitely worth the price of admission."

== Reviews ==
- Polyhedron #75
