= Ascent To Anekthor =

Science-fiction role-playing game supplement

- Cover by William H. Keith
- Designers: J. Andrew Keith
- Publishers: Gamelords
- Publication: 1984; 42 years ago
- Genres: Science-fiction
- Systems: Classic Traveller

Ascent To Anekthor is a 1984 fantasy role-playing game adventure, written by J. Andrew Keith, and published by Gamelords for Traveller.

== Plot summary ==
Ascent To Anekthor is an adventure in which the player characters join an expedition with a daredevil noblewoman to scale a mountain against two other groups to win a wager. It utilized the rules from The Mountain Environment by the same author.

== Publication history ==
Ascent To Anekthor was written by J. Andrew Keith, with art by William H. Keith Jr., and was published in 1984 by Gamelords as a digest-sized 56-page book.

== Reception ==
Stephen Nutt reviewed Ascent to Anekthor for Imagine magazine, and stated that "Ascent is the one occasion that the players climb a mountain for fun."

Tony Watson reviewed Ascent To Anekthor in Space Gamer No. 72. Watson commented that "Ascent to Anekthor is certainly not the most inspired of adventures, but the climb, if handled correctly, can be a tense and diverting venture for the players."

Arlen P. Walker reviewed Ascent To Anekthor for Different Worlds magazine and stated that "Ascent to Anekthor could easily be converted to another system were it not so heavily dependent upon the rules presented in its companion volume. The scenario idea from Ascent might be rewritten for a rules system which includes a comprehensive set of mountaineering rules, but unless you are familiar with climbers' terminology the explanations from the environment book will be necessary."
