= Kafer Sourcebook =

Science fiction tabletop role-playing game supplement

Humanity's Implacable Foe
- Cover by Steve Venters
- Designers: William H. Keith Jr.
- Publishers: Game Designers' Workshop
- Publication: 1988; 38 years ago
- Genres: Science fiction
- Systems: Custom
- ISBN: 0-943580-58-7

Kafer Sourcebook is a supplement published by Game Designers' Workshop (GDW) in 1988 for the hard science fiction role-playing game 2300 AD.

== Description ==
With the introduction in 1987 of the major "Kafer War" storyline, where humanity encounters an aggressive space-faring alien race called the Kafers, Kafer Sourcebook provides detailed information for the gamemaster about the Kafer race, including their physiology, psychology, social structure, government and politics, language, home planet, and technology. Several ideas for adventrures are included.

== Publication history ==
GDW published Traveller 2300 in 1986, quickly retitled 2300 AD to prevent confusion with GDW's previous space opera role-playing game Traveller. The following year, GDW introduced the "Kafer War" plotline in Kafer Dawn, and then published a number of supplements including 1988's Kafer Sourcebook, a 104-page paperback book with a color map written by William H. Keith Jr., with a cover by Steve Venters.

== Reception ==
In Issue 145 of Dragon (May 1989), Jim Bambra was very pleased by the high production values, and called the alien development and psychology "very believable." He concluded with a strong recommendation, saying, "The Kafer Sourcebook is a perfect example of how to design a detailed and properly motivated alien race [...] There's enough information here to please even the most ardent Kafer hunter. Once again, GDW has proved itself to be the foremost designer of alien races."

In a retrospective review of Kafer Sourcebook in Black Gate, Patrick Kanouse said "The combination of a vicious and merciless enemy, a perplexing and mysterious species with a strong contextual background, and a path for uncovering that mystery without either abject terror or killing everything on sight make the Kafers the best villainous alien in tabletop role-playing games that a I have encountered to date."

== Other reviews ==
- Tidewater Traveller Times, Vol. 2, Issue 2 (July 1988, p. 3)
- Australian Realms #5
- G.M. The Independent Fantasy Roleplaying Magazine #2
