= A Doomsday Like Any Other =

Star Trek role playing game adventure

Cover art by David Dietrick, 1986

A Doomsday Like Any Other is an adventure published by FASA in 1986 for the Star Trek: The Role Playing Game, itself based on the TV series Star Trek.

== Plot summary ==
A Doomsday Like Any Other is an adventure in which the USS Fife, on patrol in a frontier region, receives a distress call sent by a merchant ship that has encountered a Doomsday Machine identical to the one destroyed by James T. Kirk of the USS Enterprise. Threatened by both the machine and Romulans, the Fife's crew must find some way to save a planet that is the machine's next target.

Although players can use their own characters from other adventures or as part of a campaign, this book also provides six pre-generated characters.

== Publication history ==
A Doomsday Like Any Other was written by Christopher E. Williams and J. Andrew Keith, with a cover by David Deitrick, and was published by FASA Corp. in 1986 as a 64-page book with a cardstock card.

== Reception ==
In the September 1986 edition of White Dwarf (Issue #81,) Phil Frances reviewed both A Doomsday Like Any Other and sister adventure Decision at Midnight, and was very pleased by both, commenting, "I'm impressed by them. Standards of design and presentation are wonderful, and both pose real challenges to a group's role-playing abilities. They are both pleasurable to read, and the plots are presented clearly and concisely." His only fault with either adventure was that "both scenarios provide ready-to-play situations with no alternate campaign entry point."
