= The Trail of the Sky Raiders =

Science-fiction role-playing game supplement

- Designers: J. Andrew Keith; William H. Keith Jr.
- Publishers: FASA
- Publication: 1982; 43 years ago
- Genres: Science fiction
- Systems: Classic Traveller

The Trail of the Sky Raiders is a 1982 role-playing game adventure for Traveller published by FASA.

== Plot summary ==
The Trail of the Sky Raiders is a sequel to The Legend of the Sky Raiders, and picks up where that adventure ended.

== Publication history ==
The Trail of the Sky Raiders was written by J. Andrew Keith and William H. Keith Jr., and was published in 1982 by FASA as a digest-sized 56-page book with a two-color map.

== Reception ==
William A. Barton reviewed The Trail of the Sky Raiders in The Space Gamer No. 56. Barton commented that "Overall, Trail of the Sky Raiders looks to be one of the better Traveller adventures published yet this year by anyone. Chalk up another success for the Keith brothers and for FASA."

Bob McWilliams reviewed The Trail of the Sky Raiders for White Dwarf #39, giving it an overall rating of 8 out of 10, and stated that "Trail continues in much the same vein as [The Legend of the Sky Raiders], with much Indiana Jones type mixing with murky characters, fights, escapes and general mayhem."

Tony Watson reviewed The Trail of the Sky Raiders for Different Worlds magazine and stated that "This is a nicely done adventure, with a well thought out and presented background. The scenes depicted could serve as springboards for further adventures, and the non-player-characters offered should provide ample opportunity for expanded play."

In a retrospective review of The Trail of the Sky Raiders in Black Gate, Patrick Kanouse said "The Sky Raiders trilogy is a classic Traveller adventure that highlights much of the joy of this game: exploration, problem-solving, random encounters, adventure, and the occasional fight. The Keith brothers delivered an excellent ode to Indiana Jones and crafted a playable, exciting adventure in the far future."
