= Adventure Class Ships, Vol. II =

Science-fiction role-playing game supplement

Adventure Class Ships, Vol. II is a 1982 role-playing game supplement for Traveller published by FASA.

== Contents ==
Adventure Class Ships, Vol. II is a set of 15 mm-scale ship plans for ten types of major ships as well as several types of small ships.

== Publication history ==
Adventure Class Ships, Vol. II was written by J. Andrew Keith and Jordan Weisman, with art by William H. Keith Jr., and was published in 1982 by FASA as a boxed set containing a 16-page pamphlet, and five large double-sided map sheets.

== Reception ==
William A. Barton reviewed Adventure Class Ships, Vol. II in Space Gamer No. 65. Barton commented that "If you're not totally burned out on ship plans, you might find Adventure Class Ships, Vol. II to have much of interest for your Traveller campaign or for variety in playing Snapshot or Azhanti, provided the [...] price isn't a bit steep in these lean times. You certainly won't find any better than these."
