= Far Traveller =

Science-fiction role-playing game magazine

- Issue 1
- Publisher: FASA
- Founder: J. Andrew Keith
- Founded: 1982
- Final issue Number: 1983; 2
- Country: United States
- Language: English

Far Traveller was a gaming magazine published by FASA from 1982 to 1983. Far Traveller was a magazine approved to be used with the role-playing game Traveller, published in place of the previous Traveller magazine High Passage.

== Publication history ==
FASA replaced the previous Traveller magazine High Passage with the new magazine Far Traveller by J. Andrew Keith beginning with its first publication in October 1982. FASA ended its support for Traveller with Far Traveller #2 ( January 1983), even though a third issue was promised but was never published; the Keiths continued their writing for Traveller at the new company Gamelords.

== Reception ==
William A. Barton reviewed the first issue of Far Traveller in The Space Gamer No. 61. Barton commented that "Overall, Far Traveller looks like it should be an excellent addition to the world of Traveller products. High Passage will be missed, but Far Traveller should go a long way to fill the void."

Tony Watson reviewed Far Traveller #1 for Different Worlds magazine and stated that "Far Traveller was a good buy. With FASA's backing and the Keith brothers' editorial and artwork, it was too good to last."
