= 2300 AD =

Tabletop science fiction role-playing game

Mankind Discovers the Stars
- First edition cover, 1986
- Designers: Frank Chadwick; Timothy B. Brown; Lester W. Smith; Marc W. Miller
- Publishers: Game Designers' Workshop; Mongoose Publishing
- Publication: 1986 (1st edition, Traveller: 2300); 1988 (2nd edition, 2300 AD); 2012 Traveller 2300AD
- Genres: Hard science fiction
- Systems: Custom
- ISBN: 978-0943580166
- Originally titled Traveller: 2300

The tabletop game 2300 AD, originally titled Traveller: 2300, is a science fiction role-playing game created by Game Designers' Workshop (GDW) and first published in 1986. It was initially confused with the game Traveller, also published by GDW and released in 1977, however Traveller 2300 was considered its own distinct game as it used a completely different game system.

== Publication history ==
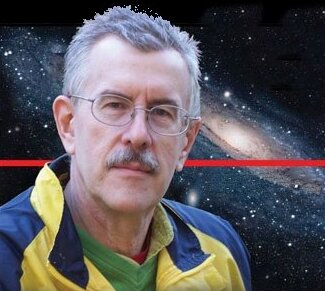
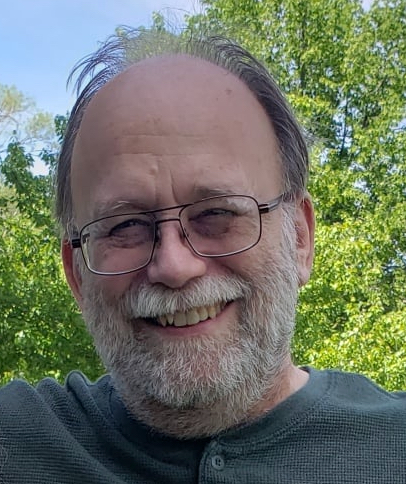
Marc Miller and Frank Chadwick were two of the designers of 2300 AD.

GDW created the popular science fiction role-playing game Traveller in 1977 with themes taken from Space Opera short stories and novels of the Golden Age of SF.

In 1984, GDW published the unrelated and much grittier post-apocalyptic role-playing game Twilight: 2000, set in the year 2000 following a nuclear war. Two years later, wanting to follow up with a similar-themed "hard science" space-based role-playing game, GDW took the Twilight 2000 storyline, moved it forward three centuries, and created a new game where humanity has recovered enough from the war that they are able to travel to nearby star systems. Although this new game, published in 1986, had no ties to Traveller, and used a completely different game system, GDW titled it Traveller: 2300. The game was published as a boxed set that contained:

- Player Manual (48 pages)
- Referee's Manual (48 pages)
- Forms Book (8 pages)
- Near Star List (8 pages)
- "The Tricolour's Shadow", introductory adventure, (8 pages)
- Star map
- a 10-sided die

The similar titles caused confusion between Traveller and the new game, and in 1988, GDW released a second edition retitled 2300 AD. Perhaps because of the initial confusion, Traveller: 2300 / 2300 AD sold poorly compared to Traveller.

About the same time, several competitors released cyberpunk-themed role-playing games which proved to be popular, including R. Talsorian Games's Cyberpunk (1988) and FASA's Shadowrun (1989). In an attempt to ride this wave, GDW published Earth/Cybertech Sourcebook in 1989 to give 2300 AD a cyberpunk theme and also return the focus of the game to Earth rather than space.

A Cyberpunk element was added to the game with the publication of the Earth/Cybertech Sourcebook and two adventures for the same, "Deathwatch" and "Rotten to the Core", and GDW catalogs began to present the game as "2300 AD - the Cyberpunk game of a Dark Gritty Future". Games historian Shannon Appelcline noted in the 2014 book Designers & Dragons, "The last few 2300 books supported this darker cyberpunk future, but it wasn't enough to sustain the line, which came to an end in 1990."

The game was republished in 2007 by QuikLink Interactive as a supplement titled 2320 AD for the Traveller20 game (based on the d20 System). In 2012, Mongoose Publishing published 2300 AD as a sourcebook for their version of Traveller.

== Setting ==
The background history of 2300 AD is a continuation of the nuclear war depicted in the Twilight: 2000 role-playing game by the same company. A custom strategy game called "The Great Game" was used by the authors to develop the background history for 2300 AD. In the intervening three centuries, mankind has rebuilt and returned to space. A Space Elevator orbital interface has been constructed, connecting the city of Libreville, Gabon to a satellite in geosynchronous orbit. Also, practical means of faster-than-light (FTL) travel have been discovered, leading to the exploration and colonization of planets orbiting nearby stars. The post-Westphalian nation-state remains dominant, and most space colonies are considered the territories of various nations back on Earth, resembling the European colonial era of the 18th and 19th centuries.

The dominant power, both on Earth and in space, is France, recently reorganized (in 2298) as the Third French Empire, and incorporating much of Africa. France was able to survive the nuclear war relatively unscathed by abandoning its NATO allies and officially withdrawing from hostilities at the start of the Third World War, retaining enough assets and skilled people to develop a significant head-start in the race for postwar rebuilding, political leverage, and technological development. Competing powers include the United Kingdom, Manchuria, Germany, and an alliance between the weakened United States and Australia. All of these control certain extrasolar planets themselves. There are three major lanes of explored space, called Arms, named after the nations which dominate them (the French Arm, the American Arm, and the Chinese Arm (Mongoose 2300AD renames the Chinese Arm to the Manchurian Arm, as the nation of Manchuria, separate from then-backwater China, is the leading nation in that part of space)). Lesser routes leading off the arms are called "Fingers".

It is still early in mankind's expansion into space, and exploration has reached little beyond 40 light years from Earth. As of the time period of the game, each of the three Arms is saddled with a particular difficulty. The French Arm is the route along which the alien Kafer are pushing an aggressive invasion into human space. The Chinese Arm is beset by an insurgent terrorist faction. The American Arm has reached a dead end, further expansion along it impossible under available technology.

Mankind has met with several intelligent alien civilizations, all of which are decidedly strange and non-human, from the genetically engineered Pentapods to the reflexively bellicose Kafers.

== Technology ==
A faster-than-light device called the Stutterwarp Drive allows mankind to achieve practical travel between planetary systems. Ships can usually reach a speed of 3.5 light years per day. The primary limitation of the Stutterwarp Drive is that it can only propel a ship up to a maximum of 7.7 light years before it must enter a gravity well to discharge accumulated lethal radiation that would otherwise kill the crew. Because ships need to reach a world within this distance, the effect of this limitation is the creation of lanes along which travel, commerce, and wars are conducted.

Overall, the technological level of 2300 AD is not significantly more advanced than that of late 20th-century industrial society. The depicted technology refines or updates established technologies, boosted by a few scientifically reasonable breakthroughs anticipated at the time of the game's publication. The "wonder-tech" of Space opera is deliberately absent, with the notable exception of faster-than-light travel. For example, most personal combat is still conducted with guns that fire chemically propelled rounds, even though energy weapons do exist. Also, no form of gravity manipulation exists, so spaceships must be designed to account for Micro-gravity conditions, and transferring from orbital space to a planetary surface (or vice versa) remains expensive. The properties and limitations of the Stutterwarp Drive and all other technologies are defined in considerable detail to prevent the use of technological Deus ex machina to resolve intractable situations.

Colonist undergo DNA Modifications (DNAMs) to adapt to life on their respective planets. GDW 2300AD originally had DNAMs for one colony, the high-gravity world of King. Mongoose 2300AD has expanded this so that a DNAM would be configured for each colony. These would involve both internal and external physical changes, such as Dry World Adaptation, where a character would retain all their water and urinate crystals. Another more extreme DNAM is Merman, which enables a person to live underwater.

== Sentient species ==
The following sentient species are known to humans in 2300 AD:

- The AGRA Intelligence
- Ebers: confined to one planet in 2300, they once had an interstellar civilization with a presence on at least three other planets, although all that is left of them on those planets are ruins from a destructive war.
- Kafers (Kaefers): the primary adversary species in 2300 AD are humanoids with mandibles and integument similar to some Terran insects and a hard dorsal shell (thus the name derived from German Käfer, "beetle"). Their technological advancement is equivalent to humanity's, including interstellar travel capability. Kafer individuals normally have a low intelligence, approximate to a human IQ of 40. However, in stressful situations, their equivalent to an adrenaline reaction functions as a neural accelerant, pleasurably increasing situational awareness, speed of reasoning, and creativity. The Kafers feel most alive when in danger, and are, in effect, addicted to it. The more often an individual Kafer experiences stress-induced intelligence, the more intelligent they remain in a non-stressed state. While the Kafers are carrion-eating scavengers, and not intrinsically violent, their neurobiology creates a quandary for their civilization: civilization acts to reduce violence and stress and leads to a steady loss of a Kafer culture's intelligence and, finally, inevitable conquest by smarter, less-civilized cultures. The present Kafer civilization has resolved this quandary with systems of ritualized violence and a glorification of war. Ruled over by a small minority of "permanently bright" individuals, the Kafers are paradoxically both terrified and excited by humanity, since humans resemble the "smart barbarians" that periodically destroyed earlier civilizations on their home planet, and therefore represent the real competition needed to inspire their civilization to advance. In the year 2301, the Kafer start an invasion of human space that will be costly to both attackers and defenders and serves as one of the major dramatic events of the game line. Mongoose 2300AD altered their name to "Kaefers."
- The primitive Klaxun (Arbors): A species of sentient tree-like creatures native to a nearly-frozen world at the edge of the French Arm (Mongoose 2300AD altered their name to "Arbors")
- The nuclear war-devastated Little Guys
- The long-dead Medusae
- Pentapods: an amphibious species with a preference for aquatic environments, with a biotechnological technical infrastructure (including starships that are massive living beings). The fact that some Pentapods show signs of genetic engineering and are treated as tools by other Pentapods masks a deeper secret regarding their origins.
- Sung: a species of winged humanoids of smaller stature than humans, whose technological development is close to but not as great as humanity's in most areas; they are currently only capable of interplanetary travel. In some areas, like medical technology, interface spacecraft, lasers, and solar energy technology, they are superior to humanity.
- Xiang: a species inhabiting a gas giant's moon in the Sung home star system, formerly enslaved by the Sung but now free after a brief military action by a number of human nations. Relations among the Sung are governed by a principle that the strong dominate the weak but provide the weak with requested assistance to bring them up to their masters' level, and they took advantage of the fact that the Xiang never made such requests. The Sung now consider humanity to be their superiors in this system and are chafing at humanity's refusal to improve them by showing them how to perform FTL travel.
- The Ylii, a multi-species culture enslaved by the Kafers.

== Sentient species mysteries ==
Every sentient species has certain mysteries that are unknown to humans in 2300 AD and which can be unlocked through adventure and research. One of the main parts of the drama in 2300 AD campaigns is the unfolding of these mysteries.

Some of these mysteries can help humanity in its "battle for the stars", while others are simply curiosities, and a few are dangerous and even potentially disastrous for humankind.

In many cases, human nation states would be willing to go to war with each other to get some of these secrets and some are a necessity for humankind to survive the future war with the Kafers.

== Reception ==
In Issue 36 of Casus Belli, Pierre Lejoyeux reviewed the first edition Traveller: 2300 game, and was completely mystified as to why GDW would publish two unrelated games with similar titles, fearing that GDW was trying to replace the old game with the new game. "Will they consign Traveller to oblivion by releasing a new game of the same inspiration?" he asked. "Why make the two games incompatible, condemning the many Traveller supplements published to date to dust?"

In the March 1987 edition of Adventurer, James Chapple called Traveller 2300 a better introduction to science fiction role-playing than its predecessor Traveller because the setting was closer to modern-day Earth. He thought the equipment and weapons included in the rules were "well thought out and reflect the beginnings of a high-tech civilisation." However, he found that the "Referee's Book" "is where the complications set in." He called the overarching Task Resolution system "probably the most generic rule I have ever seen" and said the simplicity of the rules suggested this game was aimed at a younger audience who found the rules to Traveller too complicated. He also found three major errors in the rules that he felt should have been caught through better playtesting and editing. He concluded "Overall the game is well-produced and set out [...] Apart from the apparent errors I have found, the game seems well-balanced."

In Issue 4 of Third Imperium, Mike Jackson thought that the game had potential, "but that may be all it has." He found the rules "confusing and difficult to understand on the first read", and found the game overall "poorly balanced and very incomplete." He pointed out that a quarter of the book is taken up by historical background, "while so much is left out." He also questioned the priorities of the authors, who only included 30 pieces of equipment but spent a lot of that space on four types of satellites and organic contact lenses. He also noted that although several alien species are mentioned, they are not described. He concluded, "if you like detailed background and don't mind filling in major gaps in rules, Traveller: 2300 is the game for you."

In Issue 7 of The Games Machine John Woods briefly reviewed the original Traveller 2300 game and was impressed by the "strikingly simple rules system", concluding "My first impressions are favourable." Four issues later, in a full-length review, Woods was still impressed by the setting and detail, but felt that after an in-depth examination, the game was badly let down by the rules system. He was especially disappointed in the Task resolution system, which he felt was overly simplistic, pointing out that if the players decide to try something that falls outside of the few examples given, "it is up to the referee to determine an appropriate Task, or set of Tasks, and to choose the difficulty numbers and so on for them [...] which makes life difficult until the referee has had a fair amount of practice with the system." He concluded with ambivalence, saying, "GDW have produced an excellent and entertaining universe for near-future star-hopping adventure. With the various supplements available, the Traveller 2300 world is as well-detailed and as much fun as any you can play. But its rules system is something of a let-down."

In the May 1987 edition of White Dwarf (Issue #89), Jim Bambra reviewed the original Traveller 2300 game, and found the rules "somewhat tedious reading". Having slogged through the rules, he found much to recommend the game, including the character generation system, the skill system, and combat — although he found combat slow compared to the skill system. Bambra felt the starship combat system was "not as good as it could have been... Space combat does not flow very well and is potentially very fiddly once the missiles are flying." Bambra also noted the lack of scenarios, saying, "There is very little information about adventures", pointing out that even in the provided adventure, "vast chunks are left for the GM to develop — a daunting task for most." Bambra concluded, "I would prefer simpler mechanics and a more exciting background."

Bambra also reviewed Traveller 2300 in the March 1988 edition of Dragon (Issue 131), and to the points he had made in White Dwarf, Bambra also criticized the lack of an experience point system — unlike AD&D, where characters advance in skills and powers through their experiences, "A character can survive for years in this game, but he does not improve with age or experience; he stays the same forever. Sure, the PC can get more hardware, more influence, and so on, but he never gets any better at solving tasks." Bambra again emphasized the lack of scenarios, and also the lack of examples in the rules to provide clarity, concluding, "Experienced GMs will have few problems with the game's less-than-satisfactory handling of adventure staging and description, but novices should look elsewhere for their first science-fiction RPG."

A year later, in the May 1989 edition of Dragon (Issue 145), Jim Bambra had a chance to revisit the game with the publication of the updated 2300 AD, successor to Traveller 2300. Bambra found much to like in the new version of the game, including the upgrade from 96 pages of rules and background in the original setting to 208 pages in the revised setting. Bambra found the new rules for 2300 AD were better organized and had a much more professional layout than the previous version. He also found the sections demonstrating the game to new gamemasters to be very helpful. Bambra concluded with a positive recommendation: "The 2300 AD game is a greatly welcomed development. With its new and improved presentation, revised and expanded rules and background, more dynamic feel, and extensive range of support products, the 2300 AD game can truly be called a state-of-the-art science-fiction role-playing game. I recommend it highly to anyone looking for a game of hard science-fiction that pulls no punches and delivers the goods in a highly satisfying manner. In bringing out the 2300 AD game, GDW has come up trumps and made a good game into a great one."

Rick Swan reviewed the original Traveller: 2300 in Space Gamer/Fantasy Gamer No. 79. Swan commented that "Traveller: 2300 is not as good as Twilight: 2000 and is a distant third behind the original Traveller, although admittedly those games are tough acts to follow."

Steve Wieck reviewed 2300 AD in White Wolf #13 (December 1988), rating it a 3 out of 5 and stated that "Overall, 2300AD is game for true sci-fi fans who are looking for role-playing in a realistic human civilization of the future."

Three years later, in his 1990 book The Complete Guide to Role-Playing Games, Swan found that Traveller:2300 came a distant third behind other notable post-apocalyptic role-playing games published by GDW, Twilight: 2000 and MegaTraveller. Although Swan found the character creation rules "elegant", he found the task-resolution system "both awkward and ambiguous" and combat "likewise complicated." Swan concluded by giving this game a rating of 2.5 out of 4, saying, "Traveller: 2300 isn't a bad game, it's just an unnecessary one."

In the same book, Swan reviewed the revised game 2300 AD and pegged its rating at a solid 3 out of 4, saying, "Helpful sections on running and designing adventures ... and the improved organization makes 2300 AD a lot easier to learn than Traveller: 2300. [The designers] turned a fair game into a great one, an impressive accomplishment."

In a retrospective review in Shadis #28 (October 1996), Matt Staroscik remembered 2300 AD favorably because of its cultural ties to present-day Earth. He also recalled that "All of the weapons and starships have a realistic feel, and the uses they project for biotechnology especially are fantastic." Overall, he thought the game provided an "atmosphere of gritty realism, and that's what I, at least, am after in SF."

In a 1996 reader pool conducted by the British games magazine Arcane to determine the top 50 role-playing games, 2300 AD was ranked 50th. Editor Paul Pettengale commented: "The realistic science and technology leads to a gritty, realistic feel. Perhaps one of the best alien species ever created for an RPG, the Kafers are truly alien, with a unique physiology, psychology and society."

Martin Glen retrospectively reviewed 2300 AD for Arcane magazine and stated that "it was a damn good game. In fact, I think I'll dust it off and remind my players of just how devious and downright nasty the French Secret Service used to be. Or shall I say, will be."

James Davis Nicoll in 2020 for Black Gate said "T2300 had many interesting features: alien aliens, an attempt to provide a hard SF RPG, and most notably the Near Star map, which did its best to provide a three dimensional map of the stars within 50 light years of the Solar System. It also had... issues, from the confusing product name to playtest/proofreading issues that meant that as written, nine in ten characters were permanently comatose. Thus the 1988 second edition, renamed, polished, and expanded. As I recall, GDW even allowed people with the first edition to swap the original box set for the second edition rather than making them pay for the same game twice."

== Reviews ==
- Analog Science Fiction and Fact
- G.M. The Independent Fantasy Roleplaying Magazine #2

== Publications ==
=== GDW version ===
==== Boxed sets ====
- Traveller: 2300 boxed set – first edition core rules
- 2300 AD boxed set – second edition core rules
- Star Cruiser – Starship construction rules and tactical space combat boardgame.

==== Sourcebooks ====
- Aurore Sourcebook
- Colonial Atlas
- Earth/Cybertech Sourcebook
- Equipment Guide
- Ground Vehicle Guide
- Invasion
- Kafer Sourcebook
- Nyotekundu Sourcebook
- Ships of the French Arm

==== Adventures ====
- Bayern
- Beanstalk
- Deathwatch Program (Cyberpunk subcampaign)
- Energy Curve
- Kafer Dawn
- Mission Arcturus
- Ranger
- Rotten to the Core (Cyberpunk subcampaign)

==== Third party products ====
- Operation: Overlord (Kafer War adventure, published by 3W Games)
- S.S. Virginia (deck plans, published by Seeker Gaming Systems)
- U.S.S. Hampton (deck plans, published by Seeker Gaming Systems)

=== QuikLink Interactive ===
- 2320 AD – a 2007 sourcebook for the Traveller D20 rules, it advances the 2300AD timeline by 20 years, including consequences from the expected outcomes of published 2300AD campaigns and adventures.

=== Mongoose version ===
==== Core setting book ====
- 2300AD – converts the original setting to use Mongoose's version of the Traveller ruleset.
- 2300AD - Second Edition. Revises and adapts 2300AD for the second edition of the Mongoose version of the Traveller ruleset. This is a boxed set with three books and a fold-out poster maps of human space, showing all connections and travel distances between stars within range of the stutterwarp drive.

==== Sourcebooks ====
- Aerospace Engineer's Handbook (for 2300AD second edition)
- Ships of the Frontier (for 2300AD second edition)
- Tools for Frontier Living (for 2300AD second edition)
- Vehicles of the Frontier (for 2300AD second edition)
- Tools for Frontier Living
- Ships of the French Arm
- Atlas of the French Arm
- Hard Suits, Combat Walkers, and Battlesuits

==== Adventures ====
- Project Bayern (for 2300AD second edition)
- French Arm Adventures
- The Tricolore's Shadow
- Terror's Lair
- Rescue Run
- Salvage Rights
- Black as Pitch
- The Grendelsaga (collects Rescue Run, Salvage Rights, and Black as Pitch)
- Libreville - Corruption in the Core Worlds
- Liberty
- Invasion Part 1 - Background and Appendices (for 2300AD second edition)
