= Warstrider series =

The Warstrider series is a series of novels by William H. Keith Jr., a former author of licensed BattleTech tie-in novels.

== Premise ==
The future. Japan has taken control of Earth politics and of the majority of human colonies on other worlds and humanity is engaged with aliens known as Xenophobes. Humanity has never managed to communicate with the Xenophobes and only has the latter's attacks to learn about them. Later books detail humanity's conflict with itself, and a race of artificial beings called the Web. A subplot involves collective intelligence.

== Development ==
"This was my baby, my first SF series that was entirely my own universe. It's set in the 26th century and involves fringe-of-empire settlers breaking away from an overbearing Earth government dominated by the Japanese Empire [...] which had the sense to grab the high ground of space when the U.S. abandoned it in the early 2000s. Most of the first book revolves around a war with some VERY strange aliens, while the rest pit frontier rebels against the Empire[,] [...] then involve both in a struggle against a malevolent AI machine threat from the Galactic Core." From the William H. Keith Jr. website

== Series works ==
1. Warstrider (1993) (ISBN 0-380-76879-8)
2. Rebellion (1993) (ISBN 0-380-76880-1)
3. Jackers (1994) (ISBN 0-380-77591-3)
4. Symbionts (1995) (ISBN 0-380-77592-1)
5. Netlink (1995) (ISBN 0-380-77968-4)
6. Battlemind (1996) (ISBN 0-380-77969-2)
7. The Ten Billion Gods of Heaven (2015) (Kindle Book only)

The first six books were reissued as e-books in 2014.
