= Decision at Midnight (Star Trek: The Role Playing Game) =

Cover art by David Dietrick, 1986

Decision at Midnight is an adventure published by FASA in 1986 for the Star Trek: The Role Playing Game, itself based on the TV series Star Trek.

== Plot summary ==
Decision at Midnight is an adventure in which the player characters, all junior Star Fleet officers who attended the same Star Fleet Academy class, are assigned to the crew of the frigate USS Arkadelphia which is sent to observe the borders of a group of planets looking to become allies with the Klingons. After an encounter with a Klingon ship, Captain Ian Vellacora of the Arkadelphia starts to show aberrant behavior and suddenly announces he is blockading the planets, preventing Klingon ships from visiting. With a Klingon relief force on the way, the players must choose whether to support the captain despite his increasingly bizarre behavior, join a group of crew members opting for mutiny, or find a third path.

Although players can use their own characters from other adventures or as part of a campaign, this book also provides six pre-generated characters.

== Publication history ==
Decision at Midnight was written by Rick D. Stuart, with interior art by Todd Marsh and Gideon, and cover art by David Deitrick, and was published by FASA in 1986 as a 48-page book with a cardstock card.

== Reception ==
In the September 1986 edition of White Dwarf (Issue #81,) Phil Frances reviewed both Decision at Midnight and sister adventure A Doomsday Like Any Other, and was very pleased by both, commenting, "I'm impressed by them. Standards of design and presentation are wonderful, and both pose real challenges to a group's role-playing abilities. They are both pleasurable to read, and the plots are presented clearly and concisely." His only fault with either adventure was that "both scenarios provide ready-to-play situations with no alternate campaign entry point."

In the September 2010 edition of Diary of the Doctor Who Role-Playing Games (Issue 2), Nick Seidler suggested that Decision at Midnight was a good candidate to be adapted to a Doctor Who RPG, saying, "Best played if the players must go through the post‐incident inquiry and trial as well. Great to keep in the Trek universe or change the details if desired."
