= The Desert Environment =

Science-fiction role-playing game supplement

- Cover by William H. Keith
- Designers: J. Andrew Keith; William H. Keith Jr.
- Publishers: Gamelords
- Publication: 1984; 41 years ago
- Genres: Science-fiction
- Systems: Classic Traveller

The Desert Environment was written by J. Andrew Keith and William H. Keith Jr. for Game Designers Workshop's Traveller role-playing game, and published under license by Gamelords in 1984. The book provides Traveller gamemasters with in-depth information about the desert, allowing them to accurately present adventures in the desert wastes of alien worlds. A companion adventure, Duneraiders was written by the same author.

== Publication history ==
The Desert Environment was written by William H. Keith Jr. and was published in 1984 by Gamelords as a digest-sized 56-page book.

== Reception ==
In the January-February 1985 edition of Space Gamer (Issue No. 72), Tony Watson commented that "The Desert Environment is recommended if your campaign includes desert adventurers. This book should provide all the information necessary to really set the scene."

Steve Nutt reviewed The Desert Environment for Imagine magazine, and stated that "The supplement is well researched, but it must be emphasised that some of the rules systems in the book are deadly. I would advise referees to allow players full access to the book before putting them in a desert situation; in such places quite trivial actions can mean life or death."

Arlen P. Walker reviewed The Desert Environment for Different Worlds magazine and stated that "Converting The Desert Environment to another science-fiction game system will' not be as difficult as some other Traveller conversions. But the real value of this book to those who play other systems is not in its desert rules, but in the desert terrain and survival sections. Even fantasy gamemasters who despise science-fiction gaming would do well to pick up this book; anyone involved in world creation and design should find this book interesting."

In the May 1988 edition of Dragon (Issue #133), Ken Rolston called the book an exceptional treatment of nature "as the antagonist in role-playing campaigns." He noted that the information could be transferred to any role-playing game, saying that this book and two companion volumes were "my standard references when designing wilderness encounters or adventure elements for any RPG."
