= Semper Mars =

1998 novel by Ian Douglas

Semper Mars: Book One of the Heritage Trilogy
- Author: Ian Douglas
- Language: English
- Series: Heritage Trilogy
- Genre: Military science fiction
- Publisher: Eos
- Publication date: 1998
- Publication place: United States
- Media type: Print (Paperback)
- Pages: 376
- ISBN: 0-380-78828-4
- OCLC: 39027039
- Followed by: Luna Marine

Semper Mars: Book One of the Heritage Trilogy is a military science fiction novel by American writer Ian Douglas. It is the first novel in the Heritage Trilogy.

== Plot introduction ==
Set in 2040, the United States finds itself among a hostile world with only Britain, Russia, and Japan as reluctant allies. The dominant force in the world today is the United Nations, which has evolved into a world government and is challenging the US as the world’s sole superpower, motivated for the “greater good.” It has invaded Brazil because of Brazil’s lack of care for the rainforest and it wants the US to give up part of the southwest America for a Hispanic nation known as Aztlán. The UN capital is located at Geneva, Switzerland.

== Plot summary ==
The United States and Russia have set up habitats on Mars, and are researching ruins of an alien civilization near the Face on Mars. The facilities and research are being shared with UN observers. When the UN sends troops up to Mars, the US sends the Marine Mars Expeditionary Force, a 30-man weapons platoon, to protect American civilians and interests on Mars. The United States Marine Corps has been threatened with being disbanded and it hopes that this mission will breathe some life into the organization.

Back on Earth, tensions increase between the UN and the US when the US Embassy in Mexico City is stormed by militants backed by the Mexican government and the Marines stationed there are forced to open fire. The US is able to evacuate the personnel there, but not before the diplomatic damage was done.

It is the events on Mars, however, which cause war to begin between the United States and the UN. American scientists discover human remains inside one of the alien structures. From evidence discovered at the site it appears that these aliens not only were in contact with humans in the past, but may have even been responsible for the creation of the human race itself. The Americans want to release the information at once but the UN forces think differently, afraid that the world could not handle information of this magnitude. The UN forces take over the Mars station, imprisoning the Marines and the scientists, while contacting their superiors about what was found. At the same time UN forces capture the International Space Station, to control any and all launches to Mars, while the UN leadership increases diplomatic pressure on the American government.

This act kicks off hostilities on Earth. The official reason, according to the UN, is to support the independence of the Aztlan nation, among other reasons, but secretly the UN wants to stop the US from monopolizing alien technology and releasing the controversial findings. The United States finds itself under bombardment from cruise missiles launched from Cuba as well as French, German and Manchurian arsenal ships. Simultaneously forces from Mexico and Quebec cross the border to invade. At the same time Russia, one of America's few remaining allies, is attacked all along its southern border by Manchuria. Morale is low and the President is considering surrendering to the UN.

Meanwhile, US Marines recapture the ISS with the help of Shepard Station, an experimental laser armed space station. The UN orders the reluctant Japanese to attack Shepard Station. Though they succeed in disabling it, the Japanese lose all of their fighters and decide to join the Americans and their allies against the UN.

Back on Mars, the Marines are able to escape their imprisonment, but are forced to march across hundreds of miles of Martian desert to reach the UN base. The Marines defeat the UN force at Mars Prime with a surprise attack. They go on to capture Cydonia and defeat the remaining UN troops using smuggled cans of beer as an improvised weapon. The march across Mars soon becomes a famous piece of Marine Corps history. On Earth the fighting is beginning to turn to the United States’ favor.

== Characters ==
- Major Mark Alan Garroway, USMC
- Dr. David Alexander
- Kaitlin Garroway
- 1st Lt Carmen Fuentes, USMC
- Frank Kaminski
- General Montgomery Warhurst, USMC

== Literary significance and reception ==
The CNN review called the novel "well researched, and quite imaginative" with "compelling battle sequences" and also at times even evoking "sentimental pride for the USMC." On SFRevu, Ernest Lilley said the novel was similar to a Tom Clancy techno-thriller with its well constructed and plausible world political situation. Though praising Douglas for his depiction of extraterrestrial combat he found it disappointing that the alien artifacts had such a low profile.
