= Trading Team =

Science-fiction role-playing game supplement

- Designers: J. Andrew Keith
- Publishers: Marischal Adventures
- Publication: 1982; 43 years ago
- Genres: Science fiction
- Systems: Classic Traveller

Trading Team is a 1982 role-playing game adventure published by Marischal Adventures for Traveller.

== Plot summary ==
Trading Team is an adventure which is set in the Reavers' Deep sector, involving the crew of the Scotian Huntress far trader.

== Publication history ==
Trading Team was written by J. Andrew Keith and was published in 1981 by Marischal Adventures as a 4-page pamphlet; a second edition was published in 1987 by Seeker.

== Reception ==
William A. Barton reviewed Trading Team in The Space Gamer No. 53. Barton commented that "Trading Team is another worthy addition to the Traveller line. Unless you just don't like short folio adventures, it'll provide you with an interesting evening of Traveller role-playing."

Tony Watson reviewed Trading Team for Different Worlds magazine and stated that "As was the case with the previous folios, Trading Team offers a quick but challenging short adventure that a referee and his group could play through in an evening. The illustrations are nice and the price is right."
