= The Outcasts (Star Trek: The Role Playing Game) =

Role-playing game supplement

The Outcasts is an adventure published by FASA in 1985 for the science fiction role-playing game Star Trek: The Role Playing Game, which is itself based on the TV series Star Trek.

== Plot summary ==
The Outcasts is an espionage mission where the player characters try to turn a renegade Romulan into a spy for Federation Intelligence.

== Publication history ==
The Outcasts was written by Guy W. McLimore, Jr., and was published by FASA in 1985 as a 48-page book with a cardstock card. The cover art is by David Deitrick, from his original artwork, a 16" x 24" hotpress watercolor board with a watercolor underpainting overlaid with airbrush and then acrylic brushwork.

== Reception ==
In the February 1986 edition of White Dwarf (Issue #74), John Grandidge was very pleased with this adventure, writing, "At long last, FASA have released something that lives up to the high standard of the Star Trek main rules." Grandidge thought the adventure was flexible enough to work "equally well for Star Fleet officers and civilian adventurers, and there are notes in the text covering changes for the latter where needed." He noted that three of the fifteen scenes "contain combat and these punctuate nicely the shady dealings and detective work that make up the bulk of the playing time." He didn't like the suggested "Signpost Encounters" designed to help the gamemaster stay on the plot, calling them "rather heavy-handed," although he indicated that these could be reworked into "good little scenes in themselves." He concluded by giving the book a perfect overall rating of 10 out of 10, saying, "For the remarkably high overall marks below I have chosen to ignore the ridiculous prices of these adventures in order to emphasise the quality of the plots; the touch of melodrama in Outcasts" is "perfectly faithful to the essence of Star Trek."
