= Aurore Sourcebook =

Role playing game supplement

Humanity's Furthest Outpost
- Cover by Steve Venters
- Designers: William H. Keith Jr.
- Publishers: Game Designers' Workshop
- Publication: 1987; 39 years ago
- Genres: Science fiction
- Systems: 2300 AD
- ISBN: 0943580374

Aurore Sourcebook is a supplement published by Game Designers' Workshop in 1987 for the science fiction role-playing game 2300 AD.

== Contents ==
Aurore Sourcebook is a campaign setting supplement which details the distant planet Aurore and includes ideas for adventure scenarios, with eight pages of color illustrations.

== Publication history ==
Aurore Sourcebook was written by William H. Keith Jr., with a cover by Steve Venters, and was published in 1987 by Game Designers' Workshop as a 96-page book.

== Reception ==
In the May 1988 edition of Dragon (Issue #145), Jim Bambra thought this book "contains a wealth of detail and is stuffed full of adventure ideas... Great care and inspired design have gone into this book." Bambra concluded, "The Aurore Sourcebook is highly recommended as a fully fledged science-fiction setting and as a world of adventure."

== Other reviews ==
- Tidewater Traveller Times Volume 1, Issue 5 (Oct 1987, p. 5)
- G.M. The Independent Fantasy Roleplaying Magazine #2
