= The Hammer Shall Strike =

The Hammer Shall Strike is a 1985 role-playing game adventure published by Fantasy Games Unlimited for Psi World.

== Plot summary ==
The Hammer Shall Strike is an adventure containing two scenarios, as well as new rules.

The Hammer Shall Strike expands the psionic system by introducing the new Animalist major discipline along with ten minor psionic disciplines, and a set of marginal abilities used by the weaker majority of Psi characters.

== Publication history ==
The Hammer Shall Strike was written by Del Carr and Cheron, and was published by Fantasy Games Unlimited in 1985 as an 32-page book.

== Reception ==
Stewart Wieck reviewed The Hammer Shall Strike in White Wolf #7 (1987), rating it a 6 out of 10 and stated that "This adventure supplement is useful mostly because of its addition of the major discipline Animalist and ten minor disciplines. It also lists marginal psionic abilities which the weaker 90% of Psis possess."

== Reviews ==
- Comics Feature #45
