= Ordeal by Eshaar =

Science-fiction role-playing game supplement

- Designers: J. Andrew Keith; William H. Keith Jr.
- Publishers: FASA
- Publication: 1981; 45 years ago
- Genres: Science fiction
- Systems: Classic Traveller

Ordeal by Eshaar is a 1981 role-playing game adventure for Traveller published by FASA.

== Plot summary ==
Ordeal by Eshaar is an adventure in which the player characters must deal with the diplomacy and intrigue early in the Fifth Frontier War on an alien planet near the Zhodani Consulate.

== Publication history ==
Ordeal by Eshaar was the first published Traveller adventure by FASA. Ordeal by Eshaar was written by J. Andrew Keith and William H. Keith Jr. and was published in 1981 by FASA as a digest-sized 44-page book.

== Reception ==
William A. Barton reviewed Ordeal by Eshaar in The Space Gamer No. 46. Barton commented that "Ordeal by Eshaar is undoubtedly the best non-GDW Traveller adventure published by anyone so far – and it ranks high among GDW's own offerings. Recommended."

Tony Watson reviewed Ordeal by Eshaar for Different Worlds magazine and stated that "Ordeal by Eshaar is a good job all around containing fine production and a situation as interesting and intriguing as any scenario GDW has published. My only complaint is that it is a bit more expensive than it should be."

Bob McWilliams reviewed Ordeal by Eshaar for White Dwarf #31, giving it an overall rating of 6 out of 10 for the novice, and 7 for the expert, and stated that "Well produced and with plenty going on, the designers have provided referees with as much help as can be fitted in booklets of this size, gone into detail at points in the adventure where it's necessary and not filled out with 'chrome'."
