= Lee's Guide to Interstellar Adventure =

Science-fiction role-playing game supplement

- Designers: Gregory P. Lee
- Publishers: Gamelords
- Publication: 1983; 42 years ago
- Genres: Science-fiction
- Systems: Classic Traveller

Lee's Guide to Interstellar Adventure is a 1983 role-playing game supplement for Traveller published by Gamelords.

== Contents ==
Lee's Guide to Interstellar Adventure is a book that provides both a description of the planet and an adventure scenario for 11 worlds.

== Publication history ==
Lee's Guide to Interstellar Adventure was written by Gregory P. Lee and was published in 1983 by Gamelords as a digest-sized 48-page book.

== Reception ==
Roger E. Moore reviewed Lee's Guide to Interstellar Adventure, Vol. 1 in Ares Special Edition #2 and commented that "Lee's Guide makes an excellent addition to a Traveller game referee's library, and referees of other SF role-playing games might well be advised to pick this booklet up and adapt the situations to their own game campaigns. I highly recommend it."

Tony Watson reviewed Lee's Guide to Interstellar Adventure in The Space Gamer No. 72. Watson commented that "all very good [...] A solid, original effort."

Tony Watson reviewed Lee's Guide to Interstellar Adventure for Different Worlds magazine and stated that "I was pleased with volume 1 of Lee's Guide to Interstellar Adventure, and look forward to subsequent volumes, should Gamelords decide to produce them. The looser, less detailed and choreographed scenarios leave room for the referee's imagination to flesh out the details and mold the story to conform to an on-going campaign. Lee's Guide is so filled with good ideas for the referee that likes to handle the details himself, that is good for many sessions of challenging role-playing."
