= Adventure Class Ships, Vol. I =

Science-fiction role-playing game supplement

- 2010 cover by William H. Keith
- Designers: Jordan Weisman
- Publishers: FASA
- Publication: 1981
- Genres: Science-fiction
- Systems: Classic Traveller

Adventure Class Ships, Vol. I is a tabletop role-playing game supplement, written by Jordan Weisman, with a cover by William H. Keith, for Traveller, and published by FASA in 1981.

== Contents ==
Adventure Class Ships, Vol. I is a set consisting of sheets of 15mm scale deck plans and booklets of statistics and descriptions for ten distinct Imperial, Zhodani and independent ships, plus plans of a smaller scale for four additional auxiliary ships.

== Publication history ==
Adventure Class Ships, Vol. I was written by Jordan Weisman, Craig Johnson, Scott Walschlager, and Ross Babcock, and was published in 1981 by FASA as a boxed set containing a 16-page pamphlet, and five large double-sided map sheets.

It was republished in by Far Future Enterprises in 2010.

== Reception ==
Tony Watson reviewed Adventure Class Ships, Vol. 1 for Different Worlds magazine and stated that "As for the deckplans themselves, they are excellent, as one might expect from FASA, a company that entered the market with a line of deckplans. These are probably some of the most meticulous plans around, offering not the usual half-inch, 1.5 meter scale grid, but a great amount of interior detail such as consoles, tables, beds, and regular and command chairs as well. This attention to detail allows easy use of the plans with tactical combat rules such as Snapshot or Azhanti High Lightning."

William A. Barton reviewed Adventure Class Ships, Vol. I in The Space Gamer No. 49. Barton commented that "Overall, Adventure Class Ships, Vol. I proves an excellent play aid for Traveller and is recommended fully."
