= Duel Arcane =

Duel Arcane is a game of magical combat designed by John Shannonhouse and published by Gamelords in 1980.

== Components ==
Duel Arcane consists of a 28-page rulebook with 4 pull-out character sheets.

== Gameplay ==
Duel Arcane is a game involving battle between two magicians who have the ability to shapeshift into various animals. Before play begins, each player creates a mage by rolling dice to generate values for five abilities: Talent, Reflexes, Perception, Stamina and Resistance. From those values, seven more characteristics can be calculated: Hits to Unconsciousness, Hits to Kill, Fatigue Points, Initiative Roll Base, Accuracy Base, Parry Base and Damage Dice Base. The mage also has the ability to assume animal form, including a special totem form. To determine which animals, the player randomly determines the special totem form (or rarely, multiple totem forms). The player then randomly determines how many other animal forms can be learned.

For combat, players declare what their mage will do and to whom, and then roll for initiative using the number of dice allowed by the mage's current animal form. Attacks are made with three dice, and the total must exceed the mage's Strike Accuracy plus the defender's Dodge rating. If an attack succeeds, damage is rolled according to the mage's current animal form, minus the target's armor rating. The winner of a combat places the unconscious mage in limbo, and can use the mage's non-totem animal forms for one combat. Afterwards, the defeated mage returns to play.

== Reception ==
Clayton Miner reviewed Duel Arcane for Pegasus magazine and stated that "Overall, Duel Arcane is an interesting and fun game, but it does bog down at times. There are several places which need to be cleaned up a bit, but as is, it still remains a good game."

In the May 1981 edition of The Space Gamer (Issue No. 39), Aaron Allston was not impressed, saying, "I can't recommend Duel Arcane as a game unto itself; it's playable, but not worth the trouble. However, there's plenty of food for thought here concerning shapeshifting in various FRP magical systems, especially about totem animals and acquisition of forms. At [the price], it could be worth the price to GMs who like to tinker with their game systems."

In Issue 21 of Abyss (October11982), David Hargrave warned "The buyer should be aware that these rules pertain only to a specific 'kind' of role-playing gaming: that of magical combat between two 'shape shifting' magicians." Hargrave concluded "the value is definitely limited, as it is a source for only one real idea. It is best suited for the novice gamer or for one who wants to try a little fantasy gaming but doesn't want to take on the expense and involvement of a real game system."

In the January 1993 edition of Dragon (Issue 189), Lester Smith did not like the randomness of the totem animal generation system, saying, "A lucky roll for a totem form can make the difference between a moderately dangerous mage and a complete killer." Smith also found holes in the rules system, and thought the character creation system was "fairly cumbersome." On the plus side, Smith liked the game because the characters generated were unique individuals, and because the combat system was quick and flexible. He concluded with a recommendation: "If the idea of shape-changing combat sounds appealing to you... by all means buy it."
