= Psi World =

Tabletop science fiction role-playing game

Roleplaying game of psionic powers
- Designers: Del Carr; Cheron Carr
- Publishers: Fantasy Games Unlimited
- Publication: 1984; 42 years ago
- Genres: Science fiction

Psi World is a science fiction role-playing game published by Fantasy Games Unlimited (FGU) in 1984 that takes place in a near-future society in which certain individuals have psionic powers.

== Description ==
In Psi World, players take on the roles of character who have psionic powers. The gamemaster decides whether the campaign will feature psionic characters oppressed by an intolerant society and hunted by the police, or held up as heroes for using their powers to benefit humanity.

The boxed set contains a 32-page booklet "Role Playing Game of Psionic Powers", a 30-page booklet "The Psi World Adventure", a cardstock gamemaster's screen, a sample character sheet, and dice.

During character creation, players can choose from a number of skills, which can be either Level or Non-Level. Level skills, such as unarmed combat, can vary in how well the skill can be done. Non-Level skills, such as swimming, are simply a qualitative yes or no — the character can either swim or cannot swim.

Players also choose either one major psionic power such as Teleportation or Precognition, or two minor powers such as Pyrokinesis.

The rules cover combat, and "the World." Two introductory scenarios are included.

== Publication history ==
Psi World was designed by Del Carr and Cheron, with art by Bill Willingham, Matt Wagner, Bill Cucinotta, Janet Jackson, Rich Rankin, and Cheron, and was published in 1984 by FGU

In 1985, William H. Keith Jr. and J. Andrew Keith expanded into FGU's game lines including Psi World.

In 1985 FGU published the supplement The Hammer Shall Strike that contained new psionic powers and two scenarios. FGU also released five sequentially linked scenarios for Psi World. The first three were in Underground Railroad (1985); two more scenarios were published in Cause for War (1986).

== Reception ==
In Issue 44 of Different Worlds, Scott A. Dillinger liked the character generation, psionics and combat rules. However, Dillinger was not enthralled with the moral issues around "reverse healing" — every power that has the ability to heal also has the ability to harm. Dillinger also thought the lack of direct psionic vs. psionic combat was a missed opportunity. Dillinger concluded by giving the game a solid 3 out of 4, saying, "It's a lot of fun for a little money."

Chris Baylis reviewed Psi World for Imagine magazine and stated that "I would suggest that this is a system for the slightly more mature player, not for the young and blood-thirsty beat-'em-up brigade. Much thought and planning is required by both GM and player, and character interaction and party cooperation is a must for survival and enjoyment."

In Issue 24 of the French games magazine Casus Belli, Michel Serrat noted with approval, "The sociological problems linked to the development of parapsychological powers are addressed precisely." Serrat also pointed out that the psionics rules could easily be transplanted to another role-playing game, saying, "Indeed this game is very scalable, and the referee can easily place it in any RPG campaign." Serrat concluded, "Psi World should be well accepted - despite some shortcomings."

Stewart Wieck reviewed Psi-World in White Wolf #7 (1987), rating it a 7 out of 10 and stated that "Thru and thru, Psi-World is an interesting and pleasing game. It is fairly simple, but does not achieve this by sacrificing either playability or campaign development."

In his 1990 book The Complete Guide to Role-Playing Games, game critic Rick Swan called the game "an interesting premise for an RPG ... generally well done and reasonably engaging." Swan concluded by giving the game a rating of 2.5 out of 4, saying, "Psi World is an interesting alternative to standard fantasy RPGs, but its focus is ultimately too narrow for extended play."

In his 1991 book Heroic Worlds, Lawrence Schick commented: "Feel persecuted just because you're better than everyone else? This game is for you!"
