= The Phantastical Phantasmagorical Montie Haul Dungeon =

Role-playing game supplement

The Phantastical Phantasmagorical Montie Haul Dungeon is a 1982 role-playing game adventure published by Gamelords.

== Contents ==
The Phantastical Phantasmagorical Montie Haul Dungeon is a humorous fantasy role-playing game adventure.

== Reception ==
Lewis Pulsipher reviewed The Phantastical Phantasmagorical Montie Haul Dungeon in The Space Gamer No. 51. Pulsipher commented that "This might have made a decent article in Dragon magazine, but as a module it seems overpriced to all but those who delight in fiendish GM 'humor.' You'd be better off creating your own funny dungeon."
