= Aslan Mercenary Ships =

Science-fiction role-playing game supplement

- Designers: J. Andrew Keith; Jordan Weisman; Ross Babcock III
- Publishers: FASA
- Publication: 1982; 43 years ago
- Genres: Science fiction
- Systems: Classic Traveller

Aslan Mercenary Ships is a 1982 role-playing game supplement for Traveller published by FASA.

== Contents ==
Aslan Mercenary Ships is a boxed set presenting deck plans with descriptions for two 3,000 ton Aslan mercenary ships.

== Publication history ==
Aslan Mercenary Ships was written by J. Andrew Keith, Jordan Weisman, and Ross Babcock III, and was published in 1982 by FASA as a boxed set containing two digest-sized 16-page pamphlets, three large maps, and counters.

== Reception ==
William A. Barton reviewed Aslan Mercenary Ships in The Space Gamer No. 57. Barton commented that "I recommend Aslan Mercenary Ships even more than its companion set, especially for those Traveller players who hunger for more on the Aslan corner of the universe."

Tony Watson reviewed Aslan Mercenary Ships for Different Worlds magazine and stated that "Aslan Mercenary Ships offers a useful, pre-assembled package for introducing the operations of an alien race into a Traveller or Striker campaign, and should prove valuable to referees who conduct militarily oriented campaigns. The set is nicely presented and well thought out. My only caveat is regarding the price: [the price] is a bit high for what you get. For the referee who wishes to make Asians an important part of his campaign, especially Asians operating in a military capacity, the play aid would be useful."

Bob McWilliams reviewed Aslan Mercenary Ships for White Dwarf #36, giving it an overall rating of 6 out of 10 for the novice, and 8 for the expert, and stated that "the plans themselves and the supporting material show continuing improvement over past efforts from the company."
