= The Undersea Environment =

Science-fiction role-playing game supplement

- Cover by William H. Keith
- Designers: J. Andrew Keith
- Publishers: Game Designers' Workshop
- Publication: 1983
- Genres: Science-fiction
- Systems: Classic Traveller

The Undersea Environment is a 1983 role-playing game supplement, written by J. Andrew Keith for Traveller, and published by Gamelords.

== Contents ==
The Undersea Environment is a supplement that details alien oceans, including factors in the depths that affect characters such as pressure, gravity, temperature, the effects of decompression on divers, and undersea communication and combat.

== Publication history ==
The Undersea Environment was written by J. Andrew Keith, with art by William H. Keith Jr., and was published in 1983 by Gamelords as a digest-sized 48-page book.

A companion adventure, The Drenslaar Quest was written by the same author.

== Reception ==
Tony Watson reviewed The Undersea Environment for Different Worlds magazine and stated that "Given the wealth of background information contained in this volume, it should not be too difficult for a gamemaster to set up and run an adventure or two under the sea. If your Traveller campaign might benefit from such a setting, this book may prove extremely useful, and may in fact find applicability for other role-playing systems."

Tony Watson reviewed The Mountain Environment and The Undersea Environment together in The Space Gamer No. 72. Watson commented that "The tight focus and elaborate detail of these supplements is both their strength and weakness. Just about all aspects of mountain and undersea environments are covered, but I wonder just how much of this material is really going to make its way into the average adventure."
