= Earth/Cybertech Sourcebook =

Tabletop role-playing game supplement

Cover art by Janet Aulisio, 1989

Earth/Cybertech Sourcebook is a supplement published by Game Designers' Workshop (GDW) in 1989 for the science-fiction role-playing game 2300 AD.

== Description ==
Earth/Cybertech Sourcebook gives a cyberpunk spin to the 2300 AD game. The book describes Earth in the 24th century, Earth's protective shell of defensive spaceships, the orbiting duty-free port called "Gateway", a description of the cyberpunk ethos, a range of personal bionic enhancements, and the concept of cyberspace.

The book includes a complete cyberpunk adventure, "Worm in the Big Apple".

== Publication history ==
GDW created their popular space opera role-playing game Traveller in 1977. Nine years later, GDW released a new and unrelated role-playing game with a hard science theme, Traveller 2300. Although Traveller and Travller 2300 were unrelated games, the similar titles caused confusion, and in 1988, GDW released a second edition of the new game retitled 2300 AD. Perhaps because of the initial confusion, Traveller 2300 / 2300 AD sold poorly compared to Traveller.

About the same time, several competitors released cyberpunk-themed role-playing games which proved to be popular, including R. Talsorian Games's Cyberpunk (1988) and FASA's Shadowrun (1989). In an attempt to ride this wave, GDW published Earth/Cybertech Sourcebook in 1989 to give 2300 AD a cyberpunk theme. The 96-page book was written by Lester W. Smith, with interior art by Rick Harris, Rob Caswell, and Tim Bradstreet, and cover art by Janet Aulisio.

GDW also quickly published several other cyberpunk supplements for 2300 AD, but sales were poor. As games historian Shannon Appelcline noted in the 2014 book Designers & Dragons, "The last few 2300 books supported this darker cyberpunk future, but it wasn't enough to sustain the line, which came to an end in 1990."

== Reception ==
In Issue 19 of The Games Machine (June 1989), John Woods thought most of this book was just okay, but called the 14-page chapter about cybertech "The supplement's most exciting part" and hoped GDW would release more material about this part of the game. Overall, he warned that "Like most of the 2300 AD add-ons, this supplement's emphasis is on ideas for referees to develop further rather than instant action-packed material." He concluded, "There's plenty here to keep players happy, and with a little referee work and some judicious borrowing from book and film sources, it should provide dozens of adventures for any group, with the Cyberpunk rules adding quite literally a new dimension to roleplaying! Strongly recommended."

In the May 1989 edition of Games International (Issue 5), Paul Mason liked the layout of the book, although he felt some of the art was substandard. He also commented that several geographical errors "undermines the authority of the background material." Mason found the usefulness of the book to vary chapter by chapter. He thought descriptions of nations in 2300 "were not the most riveting reading" and "don't enhance the usefulness of the book as a tool to run a cyberpunk game", found the chapter on cybertech "quite sophisticated", but said the chapter on cyberspace was "quite superficial". He concluded that the book "is excellent value for 2300 referees who wish to inject a dose of cyberpunk into their campaign. If you don't already play 2300, you probably won't find it too useful."

== Other reviews ==
- Games Review, Vol. 1 Issue 8 (May 1989, p.20) and Vol 2, Issue 7 (Apr 1990, p.31)
- Casus Belli, Number 23 (April 1989, p.5)
- Casus Belli #69 (May 1992)
- Codling, Stuart (February 1990). "Earth/Cybertech Sourcebook". GamesMaster Magazine. 2 (6): 29.
