= Heritage Trilogy =

Series of books written by Ian Douglas

Heritage Trilogy is a series of military science fiction books written by Ian Douglas that focus on the United States Marine Corps. It is followed by the Legacy Trilogy and the Inheritance Trilogy.

== Novels ==
- Semper Mars (1998)
- Luna Marine (1998)
- Europa Strike (2000)

== Background ==
The events of the Heritage Trilogy span from 2040 to 2067. In Semper Mars, evidence of an alien civilization that may have intervened in human evolution threatens to throw the Earth into chaos and war when discovered by scientists in the subterranean ruins on Mars. The Marine Mars Expeditionary Force, a 30-man weapons platoon, has been dispatched from the United States Marine Corps to Mars to protect American civilians and interests with lethal force if necessary. The discoveries on Mars, however, start a global war. The United States and its allies fight against most of the member nations of United Nations.

As the war drags on it is discovered that Mars is not the only place that holds ruins of an alien civilization. In Luna Marine it is discovered that the Earth's own Moon contains mysterious technologies of long vanished species. The US attempts to take those ruins currently held by the UN using another Marine force made from veterans from Mars, supported by the first antimatter-powered starship. The UN, however, plans to end the war by dropping an asteroid on the United States. Though an Aerospace Force nuclear missile strike is able to divert the asteroid itself, they are unable to prevent the wreck of the UN starship shepherding the asteroid from crashing on Chicago, destroying part of the city. Meanwhile, the alien ruin on the Moon is captured and humanity learns a second alien race not only taught them the elements of civilization but also enslaved them. The war ends with the UN suing for peace before it eventually collapses.

Twenty years after the UN War, the Earth's nations continue to fight in space for scraps of alien technology. In Europa Strike a strange artifact lies imprisoned beneath the ice-locked oceans of Europa. Both a Chinese task force and a Marine Expeditionary Unit race to secure the artifact. It turns out it is a starship is called "The Singer" for the eerie tones it emits. Crewed by an ancient artificial intelligence, in turns out that this ship belongs to a third race that is responsible for the destruction of the other two alien civilizations that once inhabited the Solar System.

== Major themes ==
The Heritage Trilogy focuses on the United States Marine Corps and Ian Douglas (a pseudonym for William H. Keith Jr.) shows his fondness for the Marine Corps by providing history and other trivia on this branch of the American military. The trilogy is also noted for its ability to evoke American patriotism.
