= Legacy Trilogy =

Series of books written by Ian Douglas

Legacy Trilogy is a series of military science fiction books written by Ian Douglas that focus on the United States Marine Corps. The trilogy is the sequel to the Heritage Trilogy and is followed by the Inheritance Trilogy.

Where Douglas's previous Heritage Trilogy focussed mainly on the exploits of United States Marines engaged in combat against, at various points, the UN and the Chinese, throughout various locations within the Solar System, the Legacy trilogy brings the 'Hunters of the Dawn' sub-plot to the fore, and concentrates on interstellar combat against various alien races.

As with the Heritage Trilogy, the three novels span a considerable amount of time, (reflecting partly the temporal dislocation experienced by marines travelling on ships at relativistic speeds). As before, the principal characters are members of the Garroway, Ramsey, Lee, Alexander and Warhurst families, who lend continuity to the story as members of Marine Corps dynasties.

== List of novels ==
- Star Corps (2003)
- Battlespace (2006)
- Star Marines (2007)
