= 2300AD Ground Vehicle Guide =

Ground Vehicle Guide is a supplement published by Game Designers' Workshop in 1988 for the science fiction role-playing game 2300 AD.

== Contents ==
Ground Vehicle Guide is a supplement that details over 30 ground vehicles, most of which are military or paramilitary. Each vehicle description is accompanied by an illustration. Eight color plates illustrate cut-away views of four of the vehicles, as well as exterior views of two others, and unit insignias of eight units.

== Publication history ==
Ground Vehicle Guide is a 64-page perfect bound book written by Loren K. Wiseman, with additional material by Lester W. Smith and Frank Chadwick, and art by David Deitrick and A.C. Farley. The book was published by Game Designers' Workshop in 1988.

== Reception ==
In the May 1989 edition of Dragon (Issue 145), Jim Bambra found the illustrations clear, and noted that any campaigns set during the "Kafer War" would benefit from this book. Bambra concluded that "Any 2300 AD groups engaged in ground combat actions will find plenty to interest them among the vehicles described."
