= The Compleat Tavern =

Tabletop role-playing game supplement

The Compleat Tavern is a 1981 fantasy role-playing game supplement published by Gamelords.

== Contents ==
The Compleat Tavern is a supplement which features guidelines on the accommodations, employees, and patrons found in taverns, as well as rules of running games of skill and chance, and a system for barroom brawls.

== Reception ==
William A. Barton reviewed The Compleat Tavern in The Space Gamer No. 39. Barton commented that "The Compleat Tavern should prove a valuable play aid to those FRP gamemasters who haven't the time or inclination to create from scratch every aspect of their fantasy worlds - and it can even be adapted to such diverse systems as Traveller and Villains & Vigilantes."
