= Year of the Phoenix =

Tabletop role-playing game

Cover art by David Deitrick

Year of the Phoenix is a science-fiction role-playing game published by Fantasy Games Unlimited in 1986 in which the characters are accidentally transported a century into the future when Russia has occupied North America.

== Description ==
In Year of the Phoenix, players create astronaut characters who have joined the United States Space Command in 1997. Character creation, referenced in the 40-page "Training Manual", includes details of the astronauts' detailed histories and personalities. Players assign points to various "Skill Spheres" to emphasize the skills they want.

On their first mission, a routine rescue mission over Antarctica, the astronauts encounter a space warp that transports them to the year 2197, when Russia has invaded and occupied North America and are only opposed by small bands if resistance fighters.

The 80-page "Adventure Guide", the gamemaster's rulebook, describes a fairly complex skill-based system. There are two scenarios, one introductory.

The game box also includes a gamemaster's screen, a player handout, pregenerated character sheets, a map, combat grid, and vehicle counters.

== Publication history ==
Year of the Phoenix was designed by Martin Wixted, and was published in 1986 by FGU as a boxed set with cover art by David Deitrick and interior art by Martin Wixted and Patrick Zircher. FGU was in financial difficulty at this time, and Year of the Phoenix turned out to be the last new role-playing game published by the foundering company. Over the next two years, FGU published its final supplements for Aftermath!, Space Opera, Villains and Vigilantes, and Year of the Phoenix before discontinuing operations.

== Reception ==
In Issue 82 of Space Gamer/Fantasy Gamer, Lee McCormick commented that "All in all, I found the game and its components attractive, easy to read, and well organized. The gamemastering guidelines were instructional and invaluable. The game's initial premise is exciting and the 'twist' makes Year of the Phoenix a must for space gamers and patriots."

In his 1990 book The Complete Guide to Role-Playing Games, game critic Rick Swan found that "Though the basic mechanics are simple, they're smothered in an avalanche of charts, tables, and numbers that makes the game difficult to master, especially for the referee who has to keep track of it all." Swan concluded by giving the game a rating of 2.5 out of 4, saying, "Year of the Phoenix contains enough good ideas to make the effort worthwhile for science-fiction role-players looking for an offbeat alternative."

== Other reviews ==
- Stardate (Volume 3, Issue 4 - Summer 1987)
