= An Imbalance of Power =

Cover art by David Dietrick, 1986

An Imbalance of Power is an adventure published by FASA in 1986 for the science fiction role-playing game Star Trek: The Role Playing Game, itself based on the TV series Star Trek.

== Plot summary ==
Although most Star Trek adventures feature the players as Starfleet officers, in this adventure, the player characters are Klingon officers on a D7 battlecruiser. They discover a primitive world with enormous deposits of durallium ore, which is an important component of warp drive shielding. Although the planet is currently embroiled in a civil war, the characters must somehow secure the planet as a client of the Klingon Empire.

== Publication history ==
FASA first published Star Trek: The Roleplaying Game under license in 1982, and followed that with many supplements and stand-alone adventures. An Imbalance of Power, a 48-page softcover book published in 1986, was written by Michael Mornard, with interior art by Darnell Williams and Jeff Laubenstein, and cover art by David Deitrick. The package also included two bound-in pamphlets, bound-in cardboard counter sheets, and a bound-in color map.

== Reception ==
Marcus L. Rowland reviewed An Imbalance of Power for White Dwarf #85, and stated that "The amount of work imposed on the referee is a drawback, but for those who like an occasional wargame this adventure is probably a must."
