= High Passage =

Science-fiction role-playing game magazine

- Issue #2
- Publisher: High Passage Group, FASA
- Founder: Jim Cunningham
- Founded: 1981
- Final issue Number: 1982; 5
- Country: USA
- Language: English

High Passage was a gaming magazine first published in 1981, written and produced by Christopher Kupczyk, Scott Walschlager, Jim Cunningham and Craig Johnson.

== Contents ==
High Passage was a magazine that was approved to be used with Traveller.

== Publication history ==
High Passage was a digest-sized magazine that Jim Cunningham created with his High Passage Group, and after financial issues made it difficult to continue independent publication, FASA made an agreement in August 1981 to publish the magazine. William H. Keith Jr. began producing artwork for High Passage, and Jordan Weisman and Ross Babcock worked on the layout and editing, so that FASA was able to release High Passage #2 (1981) as their first issue. After conflicts between FASA and the High Passage Group, FASA editor J. Andrew Keith was able to complete High Passage #5 (1982), but right before High Passage #6 was sent to press the High Passage Group severed the partnership and advised FASA that they would not be able to publish any more material for High Passage. FASA replaced this magazine with a new one by J. Andrew Keith in October 1982 titled Far Traveller.

== Reception ==
William A. Barton reviewed the first issue of High Passage in The Space Gamer No. 40. Barton commented that "Although there is room for improvement in future issues, High Passage, based on its first issue, stands quite high among the many approved-for-Traveller items now on the market."

Tony Watson reviewed High Passage for Different Worlds magazine and stated that "I was pleased with High Passage and can give it a solid recommendation. The authors have made a concerted effort to mesh their information with the already large body of Traveller material available elsewhere. The booklet is well worth the asking price, when one considered the large amount of material included. Judging the playaid as an initial offering from a group of relative unknowns, I was very impressed."

Tony Watson reviewed High Passage, issue 2, for Different Worlds magazine and stated that "The second issue of High Passage showed some nice improvements over the first, both in quality of the feature adventure and the physical presentation. However, it lacks the first issue's diversity and is substantially shorter in page count at a higher price."
