= Denial of Destiny =

Science fiction role-playing game adventure

Artwork by David Deitrick, 1983

Denial of Destiny is an adventure published by FASA in 1983 for the science fiction role-playing game Star Trek: The Role Playing Game, based on the TV series Star Trek.

== Plot summary ==
Denial of Destiny is an adventure set on the USS Enterprise; the player characters — assumed to be Federation officers — are ordered to take Ambassador Fox and a rescue fleet to the doomed planet of Aleriad, which lies in the path of a debris field that will cause an extinction-level event. Although the inhabitants have no knowledge of space travel or the Federation, the player characters are ordered to break the Prime Directive and rescue as many inhabitants as possible. If any inhabitants agree to be rescued, the player characters may have to deal with a revolt when the inhabitants discover their planet has been destroyed.

== Publication history ==
Denial of Destiny was the third adventure published by FASA for Star Trek: The Role Playing Game, a 40-page book with eight loose-leaf pages containing the deck plans of four starships. The book was written by Andrew Philip Hooper, with interior graphic design and art by Dana Knutson. The cover art used on both the book and the cardstock slipcover packaging is by David Deitrick, from his original artwork, a 12" x 16" illustration board using airbrush, inks and dyes.

Keith DeCandido noted that the "abrasive" Ambassador Fox first appeared in the original Star Trek TV episode "A Taste of Armageddon"; Ambassador Fox subsequently made appearances in many Star Trek products, including Denial of Destiny, several novels and the DC Comics Star Trek monthly comic.

== Reception ==
In the January-February 1985 edition of Different Worlds (Issue #38), William A. Barton called this adventure "full of possibilities for exciting Star Trek adventure in the spirit of the TV series' exploration of new worlds and contact of new civilizations." Although Barton viewed the book in a mostly favorable light, he did comment that "Denial is not without its problems, though they are minor." He noted that deck plans for the Enterprise were not included, but are necessary, so gamemasters would need to salvage those from another FASA product. Barton also thought the book could have been organized better. Nonetheless, Barton concluded by giving the adventure a rating of 2.5 out of 4 stars, saying, "Overall, though, for a solid enjoyable Star Trek adventure, Denial Of Destiny is a sure bet.

The website RPG Collecting highlighted Denial of Destiny, noting that it and other FASA products for Star Trek "are hard to find, and often, they're even harder to find in good condition. Prices range widely based on condition, but if you're a hard core collector who's interested in collecting their entire line, you can expect to spend a lot of money doing it."
