= The Mountain Environment =

Science-fiction role-playing game supplement

- Cover by William H. Keith
- Designers: J. Andrew Keith
- Publishers: Gamelords
- Publication: 1983
- Genres: Science-fiction
- Systems: Classic Traveller

The Mountain Environment is a 1983 tabletop role-playing game supplement, written by J. Andrew Keith, with a cover by William H. Keith, for Traveller published by Gamelords.

== Contents ==
The Mountain Environment is a book that details how to use mountainous terrain as a locale for adventure scenarios.

== Publication history ==
The Mountain Environment was written by J. Andrew Keith, with art by William H. Keith Jr., and was published in 1983 by Gamelords as a digest-sized 48-page book.

A companion adventure, Ascent To Anekthor was written by the same author.

== Reception ==
Stephen Nutt reviewed The Mountain Environment for Imagine magazine, and stated that "How many times will your Travellers have to scale a mountain face? The only times I have been able to use this are in crash situations or when small climbs are needed, usually skulking around doing a dirty deed. Apart from that one scenario where the players climb a mountain for fun, I don't think I shall ever use the full mountaineering rules."

Tony Watson reviewed The Mountain Environment and The Undersea Environment together in The Space Gamer No. 72. Watson commented that "The tight focus and elaborate detail of these supplements is both their strength and weakness. Just about all aspects of mountain and undersea environments are covered, but I wonder just how much of this material is really going to make its way into the average adventure."

Arlen P. Walker reviewed The Mountain Environment for Different Worlds magazine and stated that "Neither is there guidance here on what hazards an experienced climber would expect to find in a climb, based on adjacent terrain, and what hazards might be completely unexpected. A gamemaster inexperienced with climbing could quite easily omit something in describing the mountain to the players which the experienced climber would have seen simply because he was looking specifically for it. This lack of adequate description might cause the players to choose an incorrect approach."
