= Traveller Alien Module 4: Zhodani =

1985 Science-fiction role-playing game supplement

Alien Module 4: Zhodani
Encounters with the Psionic Masters
- Cover by David Dietrick
- Designers: J. Andrew Keith; Marc W. Miller; John Harshman
- Publishers: Game Designers' Workshop
- Publication: 1985; 40 years ago
- Genres: Science-fiction
- Systems: Classic Traveller

Traveller Alien Module 4: Zhodani is a 1985 tabletop role-playing game supplement written by J. Andrew Keith, Marc W. Miller, and John Harshman, Cover by David Dietrick for Traveller published by Game Designers' Workshop.

== Contents ==
Zhodani details the Zhodani, a human race whose leaders are able to practice psionics.

== Publication history ==
Part of the classic Traveller Alien Modules series.

== Reception ==
Craig Sheeley reviewed Zhodani in Space Gamer No. 76. Sheeley commented that "Zhodani is a great module, the best that GDW has produced so far. I rather doubt that a lot of players will play Zhodani characters, because of the happy, well-adjusted, trusting nature of the Zhodani people [...] but gamemasters will love the module. A must for any continuing Traveller campaign."

In a retrospective review of Zhodani in Black Gate, Patrick Kanouse said "This supplement provides a GM and player all the information they need to begin playing as Zhodani or adding Zhodani as opponents or allies."

== See also ==
List of Classic Traveller Alien Modules
