= David Deitrick =

- Known for: Fantasy art

David R. Deitrick is an artist whose work has appeared in role-playing games.

== Career ==
David Deitrick has had illustrations published in several different science fiction role-playing games.

In 2014, Scott Taylor of Black Gate, named David Deitrick as No. 3 in a list of The Top 10 RPG Artists of the Past 40 Years, saying "I applaud this fantastic artist for his work on Traveller, Renegade Legion, Battletech, Star Trek, Dr. Who, Space: 1889, and Star Wars, which in itself is an incredibly impressive list."

== Works ==
=== 2300 AD ===
- 2300AD Ground Vehicle Guide

=== The Doctor Who Role Playing Game ===
- The Hartlewick Horror

=== Star Trek: The Role Playing Game ===
- A Doomsday Like Any Other
- An Imbalance of Power
- Decision at Midnight
- Denial of Destiny
- The Outcasts

=== Traveller ===
- Alien Realms
- BeltStrike: Riches and Danger in the Bowman Belt
- Traveller Alien Module 1: Aslan
- Traveller Alien Module 3: Vargr
- Traveller Alien Module 6: Solomani
- Tarsus: World Beyond the Frontier

=== Other ===
- Year of the Phoenix
