= Gamelords =

Role playing game company

- Industry: Tabletop role-playing games
- Founded: 1980 in Gaithersburg, Maryland, USA
- Founders: Kerry Lloyd; Richard Meyer; Janet Trautvetter; Michael Watkins
- Owner: Tadashi Ehara

Gamelords was an American game company that produced tabletop role-playing games and game supplements.

== History ==
Kerry Lloyd founded the company, with three friends - Richard Meyer, Janet Trautvetter, and Michael Watkins in 1980. Gamelords was centered in Gaithersburg, Maryland. Gamelords published the role-playing game Thieves' Guild in 1980. Looking to produce more group-oriented products for The Fantasy Trip, Howard M. Thompson of Metagaming Concepts signed an agreement in 1982 with Gamelords to create a campaign world for the game, but he terminated the agreement after only two campaign books were published.

When FASA ended its support of Traveller, William H. Keith Jr. and J. Andrew Keith moved their Traveller writing to Gamelords. The Keith brothers wrote seven Traveller supplements for Gamelords, including The Mountain Environment (1983), The Undersea Environment (1983), and The Desert Environment (1984).

Gamelords was sold to Tadashi Ehara in 1986.

== Publications ==
- Duel Arcane (1980)
- The Compleat Tavern (1981)
- The Phantastical Phantasmagorical Montie Haul Dungeon (1982)

=== Thieves Guild ===
see Thieves Guild Publications

=== Traveller ===
- Lee's Guide to Interstellar Adventure (1983)
- The Mountain Environment (1983)
- The Drenslaar Quest (1983)
- The Undersea Environment (1983)
- Ascent To Anekthor (1984)
- Startown Liberty (1984)
- The Desert Environment (1984)
- Duneraiders (1984)
- A Pilot's Guide to the Drexilthar Subsector (1984)
- Wanted: Adventurers (1984)
