= Tarsus: World Beyond the Frontier =

1983 Science-fiction role-playing game supplement

Tarsus
World Beyond the Frontier
- Cover art by David Deitrick
- Designers: Marc W. Miller; Loren K. Wiseman
- Publishers: Game Designers' Workshop
- Publication: 1983
- Genres: Science-fiction
- Systems: Classic Traveller

Tarsus: World Beyond the Frontier is an adventure published by Game Designers' Workshop in 1983 for the science fiction role-playing game Traveller. It is the first of five publications in the Traveller Modules series.

== Description ==
Tarsus is a module that contains several adventures set on the planet Tarsus, as well as a large amount of background information about the planet.

== Publication history ==
Traveller was published in 1977, and immediately became highly popular. A large number of supplements, expansions and adventures were published for it. Tarsus, written by Marc W. Miller and Loren K. Wiseman, and published by GDW in 1983 as a boxed set with cover art by David Deitrick, was the first in a series of five "modules" published by GDW that contained larger adventures and additional materials.

== Reception ==
Andy Slack reviewed Tarsus for White Dwarf #50, giving it an overall rating of 9 out of 10, and stated that "Tarsus is an excellent adventure for the beginning band - either of new players or of new characters - but considering the time it took me to sort it out, it may be too complex for new GMs. I refrain from giving it an overall 10 because of the lack of adequate cross-referencing and weather tables, and inconsistent hex numbering on the subsector map."

Frederick Paul Kiesche III reviewed Tarsus in Space Gamer No. 68. Kiesche commented that "Tarsus (and the concepts behind it) are an exciting new area to be explored in the Traveller universe. I am looking forward to more modules such as this one [...] There's nothing like injecting new blood into an already-lively universe."

Terrence McInnes reviewed Tarsus for Different Worlds magazine and stated that "The boxed module concept is outstanding. It allows for much more adventure material and supporting documentation than GDW's adventure booklets. If handled correctly, boxed modules could become the new standard for Traveller adventures in the years to come."

In his 1990 book The Complete Guide to Role-Playing Games, game critic Rick Swan called this "an ambitious boxed set ... an excellent introduction for newcomers and an exciting package for veterans."

In a retrospective review of Tarsus: World Beyond the Frontier in Black Gate, John ONeill said "Tarsus isn't meant to be a fully fleshed-out adventure pack in the modern sense. It's more of what we'd call a sandbox setting today — a cleverly designed setting that doesn't require players to follow a script to have fun, but rather encourages them to pursue their own interests, and has lots of rewards for players who do just that."

== See also ==
- Classic Traveller Modules
