= The Inheritance Trilogy (Douglas series) =

Novel trilogy by William H. Keith Jr.

- Country: USA
- Language: English
- Published: 2008-2009
- No. of books: 3
- Preceded by: Heritage Trilogy; Legacy Trilogy

The Inheritance Trilogy is a series of military science fiction books written by William H. Keith Jr. that focus on the United Star Marine Corps. The trilogy is the sequel to the Heritage Trilogy and the Legacy Trilogy.

== List of novels ==
- Star Strike (2008)
- Galactic Corps (2008)
- Semper Human (2009)

== Background ==
When the centuries-old refugee ship Argo is destroyed by a Xul sentry, Earth is in danger yet again. After conquering Alighan of the Islamic Theocracy, the United Star Marines must fight the Xul, but unlike previous encounters, the Marines are taking the offensive. The United Star Commonwealth sends the 1st Marine Interstellar Expenditionary Force (1MIEF) to fight the Xul out in space so as to buy time for the rest of humanity. The 1MIEF decides to investigate a system where it appears an alien race caused its sun to go nova. There they discover a race of aliens that fought the Xul before by destroying their suns. The Marines use one of these weapons to destroy a Xul base.

Ten years after the events of Star Strike, humans have located the homeworld of the Xul, deep within the Galactic Center. The 1MIEF wants to destroy the system, but misguided politics on Earth no longer support the war against the Xul and attempt to shut the mission down. Eventually a compromise is reached with a peace mission going along with the 1MIEF. The humans arrive at the exact center of the galaxy and discover a dyson sphere (or cloud) around the black hole in the center of the galaxy. Worse, the Xul are developing a weapon that can rewrite nearby reality, making targets like starships no longer exist. The peace mission fails and the Marine forces cause a star to go off course toward the black hole destroying the Xul's dyson cloud. In the epilogue this awakens a trans-galactic intelligence previously unable to access the Milky Way due to the Xul's interference.
