= The Legend of the Sky Raiders =

Science-fiction role-playing game supplement

- Designers: J. Andrew Keith; William H. Keith Jr.
- Publishers: FASA
- Publication: 1981; 44 years ago
- Genres: Science fiction
- Systems: Classic Traveller

The Legend of the Sky Raiders is a 1981 role-playing game adventure for Traveller published by FASA.

== Plot summary ==
The Legend of the Sky Raiders is an adventure in which the player characters are on an expedition supporting a scientific team, looking in swampy outback territory for clues to help them find out about the legendary Sky Raiders.

== Publication history ==
The Legend of the Sky Raiders was written by J. Andrew Keith and William H. Keith Jr. and was published in 1981 by FASA as a digest-sized 48-page book with a two-color map.

== Reception ==
William A. Barton reviewed The Legend of the Sky Raiders in The Space Gamer No. 50. Barton commented that "Legend of the Sky Raiders is definitely worth adding to your Traveller collection and, when run, should prove one of the more exciting adventures your players have yet experienced."

Tony Watson reviewed The Legend of the Sky Raiders for Different Worlds magazine and stated that "Perhaps the only criticism this reviewer can level at the book is the fact that to retain the integrity of the scenario, the referee may have to be a little heavy-handed in his guidance of the course of the action. Still, it is an excellent adventure, well worth the time and effort."

Bob McWilliams reviewed The Legend of the Sky Raiders for White Dwarf #31, giving it an overall rating of 8 out of 10, and stated that "Well produced and with plenty going on, the designers have provided referees with as much help as can be fitted in booklets of this size, gone into detail at points in the adventure where it's necessary and not filled out with 'chrome'."

In a retrospective review of The Legend of the Sky Raiders in Black Gate, Patrick Kanouse said "The Legend of the Sky Raiders holds up very well and has a place at the gaming table for adventuring Travellers to this day."
