= Traveller Alien Module 2: K'kree =

Science fiction role-playing game supplement

Alien Module 2: K'kree
Encounters with the Enigmatic Centaurs
- Cover by David Dietrick.
- Designers: J. Andrew Keith, Loren K. Wiseman
- Publishers: Game Designers' Workshop
- Publication: 1984; 41 years ago
- Genres: Science-fiction
- Systems: Classic Traveller

Traveller Alien Module 2: K'kree is a 1984 role-playing game supplement for Traveller, written by J. Andrew Keith and Loren K. Wiseman, cover by David Dietrick, and published by Game Designers' Workshop. Part of the classic Traveller Alien Modules series.

== Contents ==
K'kree is a supplement that details the K'kree race, including their history and society, character generation, and rules appropriate for the large six-limbed people.

== Reception ==
Craig Sheeley reviewed K'kree in Space Gamer No. 71. Sheeley commented that "The K'kree are a difficult race to game, but their difference should help to enliven any Traveller campaign. At [the price], 'K'kree is a good buy for the amount of material included."

Steve Nutt reviewed Alien Module: K'Kree for Imagine magazine, and stated that "This module is a good way to expand your knowledge of the Traveller universe, and this alone will probably sell it, in spite of the shortcomings."

Bob McWilliams reviewed K'Kree, Alien Module 2 for White Dwarf #65, giving it an overall rating of 7 out of 10, and stated that "Three adventures are provided and together they form a much better introduction (than with Aslan)."

== See also ==
- List of Classic Traveller Alien Modules
