= Traveller Alien Module 1: Aslan =

1984 Science-fiction role-playing game supplement

Alien Module 1: Aslan
Adventure and Intrigue with a Proud Warrior Race
- Cover by David Deitrick.
- Designers: J. Andrew Keith; John Harshman; Marc W. Miller
- Publishers: Game Designers' Workshop
- Publication: 1984; 41 years ago
- Genres: Science-fiction
- Systems: Classic Traveller

Traveller Alien Module 1: Aslan is a 1984 role-playing game supplement for Traveller, Written by J. Andrew Keith, John Harshman, and Marc W. Miller, cover by David Deitrick, and published by Game Designers' Workshop. Part of the classic Traveller Alien Modules series.

== Contents ==
Aslan is the first Traveller module released for a series of sourcebooks to focus on each of the most important alien races of the game.

== Reception ==
Craig Sheeley reviewed Aslan in Space Gamer No. 70. Sheeley commented that "Aslan is an excellent module. I recommend it without hesitation. It's worth more than [the price]."

Terry Mcinnes reviewed Aslan for Different Worlds magazine and stated that "Aslan is an outstanding achievement and a must-buy for the serious Traveller player."

Steve Nutt reviewed Alien Module: Aslan for Imagine magazine, and stated that "All in all, this is a good buy. An Aslan-based campaign would be very different indeed."

Bob McWilliams reviewed Aslan, Alien Module 1 for White Dwarf #65, giving it an overall rating of 9 out of 10, and stated that "For the most part I was not disappointed with Aslan ('Adventure and Intrigue with a Proud Warrior Race'). Naturally I could have done with even more social and historical background than is provided, but what you get inside the folder-type cover is a 40-page booklet jam-packed with detail."

== Reviews ==
- Analog Science Fiction and Fact

== See also ==
- List of Classic Traveller Alien Modules
