= Traveller Alien Module 3: Vargr =

Science-fiction role-playing game supplement

Alien Module 3: Vargr
Freebooting Encounter with Wolves of Space
- Cover by David Deitrick.
- Designers: J. Andrew Keith; John Harshman; Marc W. Miller
- Publishers: Game Designers' Workshop
- Publication: 1984; 41 years ago
- Genres: Science-fiction
- Systems: Classic Traveller

Traveller Alien Module 3: Vargr is a 1984 tabletop role-playing game supplement, written by J. Andrew Keith, John Harshman, and Marc W. Miller for Traveller published by Game Designers' Workshop. Part of the classic Traveller Alien Modules series.

== Contents ==
Vargr is a supplement which details a race that began as genetically altered wolves, descended from wolves taken from Earth to another world many years ago.

== Reception ==
Craig Sheeley reviewed Vargr in Space Gamer No. 73. Sheeley commented that "Vargr will get a lot of use in a Traveller campaign; a lot of players would find them interesting characters. [...] Even if you don't like the 'official' Imperium campaign, buy Vargr; it'll enliven any Traveller campaign."

Bob McWilliams reviewed Vargr, Alien Module 3 for White Dwarf #65, giving it an overall rating of 9 out of 10, and stated that "in my opinion, Vargr (the most recent release) is the best all round play aid since the Traveller Adventure."

Tony Watson reviewed Vargr for Different Worlds magazine and stated that "Vargr is a good buy-intelligent, well-designed, and interesting. For the Traveller campaign that needs a sound treatment of alien races, this supplement is a fine choice. However, a good portion of this material has appeared elsewhere. Those who already have The Traveller Adventure have access to much of the basic information on Vargr society and the basic Vargr character-generation tables, the most important aspects of the book. Nevertheless, for those campaigns in which the Vargr figure prominently, this is an excellent choice."

== Reviews ==
- Dragon #136 (Aug. 1988)

== See also ==
- List of Classic Traveller Alien Modules
