= J. Andrew Keith =

American game designer

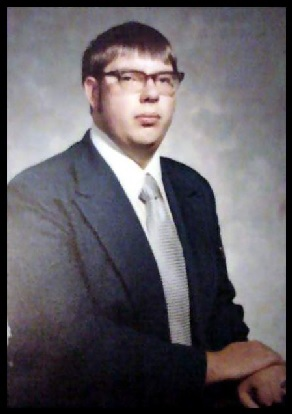
- Andrew Keith
- Born: August 31, 1958
- Died: August 7, 1999 (aged 40)
- Resting place: Saint Clair Cemetery (Greensburg, Pennsylvania)
- Occupation: Game designer

John Andrew Keith (August 31, 1958 – August 7, 1999) was an American author and games developer.

== Career ==
J. Andrew Keith, and his brother William H. Keith Jr., responded to ads in Journal of the Travellers Aid Society for authors to write for Game Designers' Workshop (GDW); Loren Wiseman started them with freelancing for GDW in the late 1970s and the three of them set up much of the early material for Traveller. J. Andrew Keith wrote so much for the Journal of the Travellers Aid Society that he began to use the pseudonyms John Marshal and Keith Douglass. The Keith brothers were making enough money that they were able to freelance full-time by 1979. The Keith brothers then began working for FASA by the end of 1980. FASA began publishing adventures for Traveller beginning with Ordeal by Eshaar (1981) by the Keith brothers, who then wrote the "Sky Raiders" trilogy (1981–1982) for FASA. J. Andrew Keith briefly edited the magazine High Passage in 1982 before the High Passage Group told FASA that they could no longer publish material for High Passage; FASA replaced this magazine with a new magazine by J. Andrew Keith called Far Traveller beginning in October 1982. FASA ended its support of Traveller in 1983, so the Keith brothers continued writing Traveller material with the new company Gamelords, but continued working for FASA on other games. The Keith brothers wrote seven supplements for Gamelords, including The Mountain Environment (1983), The Undersea Environment (1983), and The Desert Environment (1984).

J. Andrew Keith wrote some adventures for Fantasy Games Unlimited's Chivalry & Sorcery before the line ended in 1984. The Keith brothers then worked on some of FGU's other lines in 1985 including Aftermath!, Daredevils, Flashing Blades, and Psi World. The Keith brothers also designed Freedom Fighters (1986), one of the last role-playing games published by FGU.

== Works ==
Andrew was a rather prolific Science Fiction and Role-Playing Game author, and the bibliography presented below is in no way comprehensive. Several of these works were with various co-authors, most commonly his brother, William H. Keith Jr.

- A note regarding pen names in the words of William H. Keith Jr.:

"We shared several [pen names]: Keith William Andrews, Keith Douglass, and H. Jay Riker. Back in the Traveller days, when he was doing a ton of writing for the old Journal of the Traveller's Aid Society, he used several pen names, including Keith Douglass and John Marshall, so it wouldn't look like the journal was entirely an Andrew Keith production."

=== Science fiction novels ===
- Wing Commander: False Colors
- Wing Commander: Heart of the Tiger
- The Fifth Foreign Legion: March or Die
- The Fifth Foreign Legion: Honor and Fidelity
- The Fifth Foreign Legion: Cohort of the Damned
- Battletech: Blood of Heroes
- Battletech: Mercenary's Star

=== Science fiction short stories ===
- The Legacy of Leonidas
- Rendezvous with Death
- Orion Rising

=== Traveller RPG material ===
Books, Supplements, and Folio Adventures: Cargonaut Press, Digest Group Publications, FASA, Gamelords, GDW, Marischal Adventures, and Seeker.

- Escape
- Letter of Marque
- Faldor: World of Adventure
- Rogues in Space: Letter of Marque
- Rogues in Space: Scam
- Starport Planetfall

==== GDW ====
- The Traveller Adventure
- Alien Module 1 Aslan (1984)
- Alien Module 2 K'kree (1984)
- Alien Module 3 Vargr (1984)
- Alien Module 4-Zhodani (1985)
- Alien Module 5 Droyne (1985)
- Alien Module 7-Hivers (1986)
- BeltStrike: Riches and Danger in the Bowman Belt
- Alien Realms
- Aliens for Traveller
- Arctic Environment
- Chamax Plague
- Horde
- Night of Conquest
- Merchant Prince: Special Supplement 1
- Exotic Atmospheres: Special Supplement 2 (1983)
- Nomads of the World Ocean
- Murder on Arcturus Station
- Traveller Adventure 13: Signal GK
- Double Adventure 6, Divine Intervention/Night of Conquest
- Travellers' Aid Society Alien Encyclopedia
- World Builder's Handbook

==== Gamelords ====
- The Mountain Environment (1983)
- The Drenslaar Quest (1983)
- The Undersea Environment (1983)
- Ascent To Anekthor (1984)
- Startown Liberty (1984)
- The Desert Environment (1984)
- Duneraiders (1984)
- A Pilot's Guide to the Drexilthar Subsector (1984)
- Wanted: Adventurers (1984) under the pen name, John Marshal

==== FASA ====
- The Trail of the Sky Raiders
- The Legend of the Sky Raiders
- Fate of the Sky Raiders
- Harrensa Project (1983)
- Ordeal by Eshaar (1981)
- Stazlekh Report, The (1983)
- Uragyad'n of the Seven Pillars

==== Marischal Adventures ====
- Flight of the Stag
- Salvage Mission (1981, 1987)
- Trading Team(1981, 1987)

==== Digest Group Publications ====
- Grand Census
- Grand Survey

=== Magazine articles ===
List of magazine articles
- Adventures in Traveller: Exploration
- Adventures in Traveller: Trade and Commerce
- Adventures in Traveller: Wilderness Situations
- Adventurette: Jailbreak
- Adventurette: Night Rescue
- Adventurette: The Last Bastion
- Adventurette: Trial By Justice
- Amber Zone: Drannixa Gambit
- Amber Zone: Embassy in Arms
- Amber Zone: Lockbox
- Amber Zone: Raid on Stataorlai
- Amber Zone: Royal Hunt
- Amber Zone: Small Package
- Amber Zone: The Birthday Plot
- Amber Zone: Tournament
- Amber Zone: Tuktaar Connection
- Amber Zone Ventures Afar
- Amber Zone: Without a Trace
- Awaiting Shipment: Petrochemicals
- Azun
- Bestiary: Afeahyaltow
- Bestiary: Crested Jabberwock
- Bestiary: Doyle's Eel
- Bestiary: Garhawk
- Bestiary: Ice Crawler
- Bestiary: Luugir
- Boarding Pass: Jalas Glennol
- Caledon Highlanders
- Care and Feeding of NPCs
- Casual Encounter: Emil "Boomer" Brankovich
- Casual Encounter: Enli Iddukagan
- Casual Encounter: Fast "Johnny" McRae
- Casual Encounter: Gamaagin Kaashukiin
- Casual Encounter: Glorinna Firella
- Casual Encounter: Gunnar Haelvedssen
- Casual Encounter: Ramon San Yarvo
- Casual Encounter: Ringaal DeAstera
- Casual Encounter: Simone Garibaldi
- Civilian Striker Weapons
- Closest Encounter
- Compleat Starport
- Computer Implants
- Computer Software for High Guard
- Contact: Ael Yael
- Contact: Aslan
- Contact: The Girug'kagh
- Contact: Irklan
- Contact: The Girug'kagh
- Contact: The Virushi
- Dev Landrel
- Flare Star
- Hunting Bugs
- I'm a Doctor, Not a. . .
- In Transit: Grav Mining Vehicle
- In Transit: Orbital Tug
- Newcomers, The
- Outside the Expanses: Reaver's Deep
- Parachutes
- Periastron
- Pilot's Guide to Ea Subsector
- Pilot's Guide to the Caledon Subsector, A
- Pilot's Guide to the Scotian Deep Subsector
- Planetfall: Supplementary Material for MegaTraveller
- Port Authority Handbook: Arrival In-System
- Port Authority Handbook: Communications
- Port Authority Handbook: Convoys
- Port Authority Handbook: Interdicted Planets
- Port Authority Handbook: Inward Clearance
- Port of Call: Rejhappur
- Port of Call: Roakhoi
- Reavers' Deep Sector
- Referee's Guide to Planet-building, Parts I and II
- Religion in the Two Thousand Worlds
- Ship's Locker: Flares and Signalling Devices
- Ship's Locker: Torches and Welding Equipment
- Ship's Locker: Vargr Corsair Bands
- Small Cargoes and Special Handling
- Small Cargoes: Three for the Road
- Small Cargoes: Afeahyakhtow
- Small Cargoes: Hkyadwaeh
- Storm
- Striking it Rich
- Temperature in Traveller
- Traveller: The Final Frontier
- Traveller's Gear: Body Pressure Suit
- Travelling Without a Starship
- Umpire Strikes Back!, The
- Vargr Grav Platforms
- Vland!
- Wardn
- Wardn Enigma
- World's of the Imperium: Fisher's World
  - appeared in Challenge, Far and Away, Far Traveller, High Passage, Journal of the Travellers' Aid Society, MegaTraveller Journal, Space Gamer, Traveller Chronicle, and Travellers' Digest.

=== Miscellaneous Traveller Credits: FASA, and Seeker ===
- Adventure Class Ships I - Booklet II
- Adventure Class Ships II - Booklet I & II
- Aslan Mercenary Ships - Booklet I & II
- I.S.C.V. Leander - Booklet (scenarios: The Hostage, Terminal Velocity, and Raider!)
- I.S.P.M.V. Fenris - Booklet (scenarios: Boring From Within, Prisoners at Large, and Surprise Reversed)
- I.S.P.M.V. Tethys - Booklet (scenarios: Enemy Action, Staff Meeting, and Retreat from Stiara)
- Merchant Class Ships - Booklet I & II
- Starport Module I: Hotel Complex - Booklet (scenarios: Break-In, The Gamblers, and Hostages) (1981)
- Z.I.S.M.V. Vlezhdatl - Booklet (scenarios: Boarding Action, Prize Crew, and Escape) (1981)
