= William H. Keith Jr. =

American writer and game designer (born 1950)

- Born: August 8, 1950 (age 76)
- Occupation: Novelist
- Writing career
- Genres: Military fiction Science fiction

William H. Keith (born August 8, 1950) is an American author mainly contributing to military science fiction and military fiction and related game design, who writes also under several pen names, such as Ian Douglas, Robert Cain and H. Jay Riker. His newer original works are written under the name of Ian Douglas.

== Early life ==
William H. Keith grew up with his brother J. Andrew Keith.

William H. Keith served in the United States Navy as a hospital corpsman from 1969 to 1972 during the Vietnam War era.

== Career ==
William H. Keith Jr. and his brother J. Andrew Keith noticed ads in Journal of the Travellers Aid Society which announced that Game Designers' Workshop (GDW) was looking for authors; Loren Wiseman hired them to start freelancing for GDW in 1978 or 1979, and the three worked together on a lot of the early material for the Traveller universe. William Keith also contributed heavily to the graphical appearance of that era of Traveller releases. The Keith brothers began earning enough money that they were able to do freelance work full-time beginning around 1979. The Keith brothers began working for FASA by the end of 1980, with William Keith contributing artwork for the magazine High Passage beginning in 1981. FASA began publishing adventures for Traveller beginning with Ordeal by Eshaar (1981) by the Keith brothers, who then wrote the "Sky Raiders" trilogy (1981–1982) for FASA. William Keith designed the role-playing game Behind Enemy Lines (1982), the first RPG set in the 1940s. FASA ended its support of Traveller in 1983, so the Keith brothers continued writing for Traveller with the new company Gamelords, but continued to work for FASA on other projects. The Keith brothers authored seven Traveller supplements published by Gamelords, including The Mountain Environment (1983), The Undersea Environment (1983), and The Desert Environment (1984), and adventures intended for the environments described in those rulebooks.

The Keith brothers produced some material for the Chivalry & Sorcery line in 1984, and in 1985 they began working on other lines for Fantasy Games Unlimited including Aftermath!, Daredevils, Flashing Blades, and Psi World. The Keith brothers also designed Freedom Fighters (1986), one of the final role-playing games published by FGU. William Keith authored Delta Force: America Strikes Back! (1986), the first role-playing game from Task Force Games. William Keith wrote Decision at Thunder Rift (1986), the first novel published by FASA. William Keith authored a large MegaTraveller campaign set in the Gateway sector for The MegaTraveller Journal #4 (1993), the final publication of Digest Group Publications.

William Keith became a professional artist and writer, working in the game industry with his brother Andrew, particularly for Game Designers' Workshop and FASA before becoming a full-time author. Much of his early work, including the Warstrider series, the Freedom's Rangers series, the Cybernarc series, and the Invaders of Charon series, is currently out of print; 'Warstrider' will be re-released in 2014. He was also an early author for BattleTech, writing the saga of the Gray Death Legion.

Keith also writes under various pseudonyms and "house names", including Ian Douglas and H. Jay Riker, and is a shadow author of several books "by" celebrities. He has written extensively in Keith Laumer's Bolo series, contributing several short stories to the Bolo anthologies, as well as three full-length books, Bolo Brigade, Bolo Strike, and Bolo Rising. As Ian Douglas, he writes military science fiction: the Galactic Marines series (composed of the Heritage Trilogy, the Legacy Trilogy, and the Inheritance Trilogy), and the newer Star Carrier series. As H. Jay Riker he writes military fiction: a series about the United States Navy SEALs progression from World War II through the Vietnam War, Desert Storm, and Iraqi Freedom, and another series, The Silent Service, about the United States submarine service.

Other novels include Diplomatic Act with Peter Jurasik, and Two of Minds, nominated for a Newbery Award. He also continued Keith Laumer's Retief series with Retief's Peace. His first non-fiction book, The Science of the Craft, was published in 2005; it is about the link between witchcraft and science.

Keith's recent work includes three books in Stephen Coonts' Deep Black series; a police procedural/detective novel in the Android universe; and a new series about Navy Hospital Corpsmen in the future.

Keith, a Wiccan and a Reiki master, is also a member of Western Pennsylvania Mensa.

== Bibliography ==
=== Significant works ===
Writing as William H. Keith Jr.:

BattleTech series

- Decision at Thunder Rift (1986) ISBN 978-0-451-45221-4; reprinted as ISBN 978-0-14-017549-3, ISBN 978-0-931787-69-0, ISBN 978-0-451-45184-2, and ISBN 978-3-453-03889-9
- Mercenary's Star (1987) ISBN 978-1-55560-030-3; reprinted as ISBN 978-0-451-45194-1 and ISBN 978-0-14-017550-9
- The Price of Glory (1987) ISBN 978-1-55560-038-9; reprinted as ISBN 978-0-451-45217-7, ISBN 978-0-14-017551-6, and ISBN 978-3-453-03891-2
- Blood of Heroes (with J. Andrew Keith) (1993) ISBN 978-0-451-45259-7
- Tactics of Duty (1995) ISBN 978-0-451-45382-2, reprinted as ISBN 978-0-451-45490-4
- Operation Excalibur (1996) ISBN 978-0-451-45526-0, reprinted as ISBN 978-3-453-10927-8

Doctor Who series

- Doctor Who & the Vortex Crystal (1986) ISBN 978-0-931787-67-6
- Doctor Who & the Rebel's Gamble (1986) ISBN 978-0-931787-68-3

Renegade Legion

- Renegade's Honor (1988) ISBN 978-1-55560-057-0

Invaders of Charon: Buck Rogers in the XXVth Century series

- Nomads of the Sky (1992) ISBN 978-1-56076-098-6
- Warlords of Jupiter (1993) ISBN 978-1-56076-576-9, reprinted as ISBN 978-0-09-931551-3

Sharuq/Stingray

- Sharuq (1993) ISBN 978-0-06-100614-2
- Stingray (1994) ISBN 978-0-06-100615-9

Westrider series

- Warstrider (1993) ISBN 978-0-380-76879-0; reprinted as e-book (2014)
- Rebellion (1993) ISBN 978-0-380-76880-6; reprinted as e-book (2014)
- Jackers (1994) ISBN 978-0-380-77591-0; reprinted as e-book (2014)
- Symbionts (1995) ISBN 978-0-380-77592-7; reprinted as e-book (2014)
- Netlink (1995) ISBN 978-0-380-77968-0; reprinted as e-book (2014)
- Battlemind (1996) ISBN 978-0-380-77969-7; reprinted as e-book (2014)
- The Ten Billion Gods of Heaven (2015) (Kindle Book only)

In the worlds of Keith Laumer

- Bolo Brigade (1997) ISBN 978-0-671-87781-1
- Bolo Rising (1998) ISBN 978-0-671-57779-7
- Bolo Strike (2001) ISBN 978-0-671-31835-2, 978-0-7434-3566-6, 978-0-7434-3566-6
- Retief's Peace (2005) ISBN 978-1-4165-0900-4, 978-1-4165-2135-8

Star*Drive universe

- Two of Minds (1999) ISBN 978-0-7869-1558-3

Android

- Free Fall (2011) ISBN 978-1-61661-097-5

Writing with J. Andrew Keith as Keith William Andrews:

Freedom's Rangers series

- Freedom's Rangers (1989) ISBN 978-0-425-11643-2
- Raiders of the Revolution (1989) ISBN 978-0-425-11832-0
- Search and Destroy (1990) ISBN 978-0-425-12004-0
- Treason in Time (1990) ISBN 978-0-425-12167-2
- Sink the Armada! (1990) ISBN 978-0-425-12300-3
- Snow Kill (1991) ISBN 978-0-425-12620-2

Writing as Ian Douglas:

Heritage Trilogy

- Semper Mars (1998) ISBN 978-0-380-78828-6
- Luna Marine (1999) ISBN 978-0-380-78829-3
- Europa Strike (2000) ISBN 978-0-380-78830-9

Legacy Trilogy

- Star Corps (2003) ISBN 978-0-380-81824-2
- Battlespace (2006) ISBN 978-0-380-81825-9
- Star Marines (2007) ISBN 978-0-380-81826-6

Inheritance Trilogy

- Star Strike (2008) ISBN 978-0-06-123858-1
- Galactic Corps (2008) ISBN 978-0-06-123862-8
- Semper Human (2009) ISBN 978-0-06-123864-2

Star Corpsman Series

- Bloodstar (2012) ISBN 978-0-06-189476-3
- Abyss Deep (2013) ISBN 978-0-06-189477-0

Star Carrier series

1. Earth Strike (2010) ISBN 978-0-06-184025-8
2. Center of Gravity (2011) ISBN 978-0-06-184026-5
3. Singularity (2012) ISBN 978-0-06-184027-2
4. Deep Space (2013) ISBN 978-0-06-218380-4
5. Dark Matter (2014) ISBN 978-0-06-218399-6
6. Deep Time (2015) ISBN 978-0-06-218405-4
7. Dark Mind (4–25–2017) ISBN 978-0-06-236898-0
8. Bright Light (11–27–2018) ISBN 978-0062369017
9. Stargods (11–26–2020) ISBN 978-0062369031

Andromedan Dark

- Altered Starscape (2016) ISBN 978-0-06-237919-1
- Darkness Falling (2017) ISBN 978-0-06-237922-1

Solar Warden

- Alien Secrets (2020) ISBN 978-0-06-282538-4
- Alien Hostiles (2021) ISBN 978-0-06-282540-7
- Alien Agendas (2023) ISBN 978-0-06-329946-7

Writing as Keith Douglas:

Carrier series

- Carrier (1991) ISBN 978-0-515-10593-3
- Viper Strike (1991) ISBN 978-0-515-10729-6
- Armageddon Mode (1992) ISBN 978-0-515-10864-4
- Flame-Out (1992) ISBN 978-0-515-10994-8
- Maelstrom (1993) ISBN 978-0-515-11080-7
- Countdown (1994) ISBN 978-0-515-11309-9
- Afterburn (1996) ISBN 978-0-515-11914-5

(subsequent books in this series written by other authors under the same house name)

SEAL Team Seven Series

- SEAL Team Seven (1994) ISBN 978-0-425-14340-7
- Specter (1995) ISBN 978-0-425-14569-2
- Nucflash (1995) ISBN 978-0-425-14881-5

(subsequent books in this series written by other authors under the same house name)

Writing as Robert Cain:

Cybernarc series

- Cybernarc (1991) ISBN 978-0-06-100208-3
- Gold Dragon (1991) ISBN 978-0-06-100283-0
- Island Kill (1992) ISBN 978-0-06-100385-1
- Capo's Revenge (1992) ISBN 978-0-06-100461-2
- Shark Bait (1992) ISBN 978-0-06-100462-9
- End Game (1993) ISBN 978-0-06-100463-6

Writing as H. Jay Riker

SEALS The Warrior Breed series:

- Silver Star (1993) ISBN 0-380-76967-0
- Purple Heart (1994) ISBN 0-380-76969-7
- Bronze Star (1995) ISBN 0-380-76970-0
- Navy Cross (1996) ISBN 0-380-78555-2
- Medal of Honor (1997) ISBN 0-380-78556-0
- Marks of Valor (1998) ISBN 0-380-78557-9
- In Harm's Way (1999) ISBN 0-380-79507-8
- Duty's Call (2000) ISBN 0-380-79508-6
- Casualties of War (2003) ISBN 0-380-79510-8
- Enduring Freedom (2005) ISBN 0-06-058597-8
- Iraqi Freedom (2007) ISBN 0-06-058607-9

Silent Service Series

- Grayback Class (2000) ISBN 0-380-80466-2
- Los Angeles Class (2001) ISBN 0-380-80467-0
- Seawolf Class (2002) ISBN 0-380-80468-9
- Virginia Class (2004) ISBN 0-06-052438-3
- Ohio Class (2006) ISBN 0-06-052439-1

Written with others

Written with Peter Jurasik:

- Diplomatic Act (1998) ISBN 978-0-671-87788-0, 978-0-671-57823-7

Ghostwritten for Bruce Boxleitner: '

- Frontier Earth (1999) ISBN 978-0-441-00589-5, 978-0-441-00794-3
- Frontier Earth: Searcher (2001) ISBN 978-0-441-00799-8, 978-0-441-00887-2

Non-fiction CD-Rom Game Guides with Nina Barton:

- Toonstruck (1996) ISBN 978-1-56686-405-3
- Titanic: Adventure out of Time (1996) ISBN 978-1-56686-657-6
- Spycraft: the Great Game (1997) ISBN 978-1-56686-425-1
- Riven Hints & Solutions (1997) ISBN 978-1-56686-691-0
- Riven Official Solutions (1997) ISBN 978-1-56686-709-2
- Fallout (1997) ISBN 978-1-56686-713-9
- Lands of Lore: Guardians of Destiny (1997) ISBN 978-1-56686-288-2
- Riven Player's Guide (1997) ISBN 978-1-56686-762-7
- Baldur's Gate (1998) ISBN 978-1-56686-788-7

Deep Black series with Stephen Coonts:

- Arctic Gold (2009) ISBN 978-0-312-94695-1
- Sea of Terror (2010) ISBN 978-0-312-94696-8
- Death Wave (2011) ISBN 978-0-312-67113-6, 978-0-312-37549-2

(previous books in this series written by Stephen Coonts and Jim DeFelice)

With Lt. Col. Anthony Shaffer:

- The Last Line (2013) ISBN 978-1-2500-0775-9

Other (short stories and non-fiction)

Short stories:

- "Dance of Vengeance" in Shrapnel: Fragments from the Inner Sphere (1989) ISBN 978-1-55560-082-2
- "Hold Until Relieved" in Bolos IV: Last Stand (1997) ISBN 978-0-671-87760-6; reprinted in The Best of the Bolos: Their Finest Hour (2010) ISBN 978-1-4391-3375-0
- "The Scent of Evil" in Starfall (1999) ISBN 978-0-7869-1355-8
- "UNODIR" (writing as H. Jay Riker) in First to Fight (1999) ISBN 978-0-515-12528-3
- "Fossils" in Asimov's Science Fiction Magazine, August 1999; reprinted in Worldmakers (2001) ISBN 978-0-312-27570-9
- "A Place to Stand" in Civil War Fantastic (2000) ISBN 978-0-88677-903-0, 978-0-7434-8741-2
- "A Show of Force" in Guardsmen of Tomorrow (2000) ISBN 978-0-88677-918-4
- "Brothers" in Bolos V: Old Guard (2001) ISBN 978-0-671-31957-1
- "Friendly Fire" (writing as H. Jay Riker) in First to Fight II (2001) ISBN 978-0-425-18007-5
- "A Terrible Resolve" in A Date Which Will Live in Infamy: An Anthology of Pearl Harbor Stories That Might Have Been (2001) ISBN 978-1-58182-222-9
- "Iterations" in Past Imperfect (2001) ISBN 978-0-7564-0012-5, 978-0-613-91914-2
- "Power Play" in Silicon Dreams (2001) ISBN 978-0-7564-0018-7
- "In the Bubble" in Alternate Gettysburgs (2002) ISBN 978-0-7394-2642-5, 978-0-425-18377-9
- "Los Niños" in Future Wars (2003) ISBN 978-0-7564-0129-0
- "Silent Company" in Crash Dive: First to Fight III (2003) ISBN 978-0-515-13575-6
- "The Weapon" in Future Weapons of War (2007) ISBN 978-1-4165-2112-9, 978-1-4165-5519-3
- "Partnership" in Man vs. Machine (2007) ISBN 978-0-7564-0436-9
- "Starfire" in Battletech: 25 Years of Art & Fiction (2009) ISBN 978-1-934857-53-3
- "Americans Landing at Normandy Beach" in Men at War (2009) ISBN 978-0-425-23013-8
- "Dead Names" in Shadowrun: Spells & Chrome (2011) (ISBN 978-1-934857-23-6)
- "The Johnson Maneuver" in Armored (2012) (ISBN 978-1-4516-3817-2)
- "Riding the Wind" in Shanghai Steam (2012) (ISBN 978-1-7705-3022-5)
- "Positive Message" in Fiction River 2: How to Save the World (2013) (ISBN 978-0-615-78353-6)
- "The New Angeles Space Elevator" (uncredited) in The Worlds of Android: Visions of Life in the Future (2016) (ISBN 978-1-63344-221-4)
- "Rings of Earth" in Towering Yarns: Space Elevator Short Stories (Volume 1) (2017) (ISBN 978-1-9814952-0-7)

Non-fiction craft:

- The Science of the Craft (2005) ISBN 978-0-8065-2633-1; reprinted as e-book (2014)

Essays:

- "The Fermi Paradox and the Inheritance Universe" (2011) http://www.whkeith.com/fermi.html
- "The Anthropic Principle" (2012) http://www.whkeith.com/anthropic-principle.html
