= Starliner =

Starliner may refer to:

- Boeing Starliner, a crewed spacecraft
- Ford Starliner (1960–1961), a fastback version of the Ford Galaxie
- Lockheed L-1649 Starliner (1956–1958), an airplane
- Spaceship (disambiguation), analog of jetliner or cruiseliner
- Vega Model 2 Starliner, a 1939 prototype lightplane by Vega Aircraft Corporation
- Studebaker Starliner (1952–1954), a pillarless hardtop version of the Studebaker Starlight
- The Starliner, a former roller coaster at Miracle Strip Amusement Park, Panama City Beach, Florida
- "The Starliner", a track from Doctor Who at the BBC Radiophonic Workshop Volume 4: Meglos & Full Circle

== See also ==
- Liner (disambiguation)
- Spaceliner (disambiguation)
- Star (disambiguation)
- Starline (disambiguation)
- Starship (disambiguation)
