= Spaceliner =

Spaceliner may refer to:

- SpaceLiner, a suborbital spaceplane developed by DLR
- Mitsubishi Space Liner car
- Spacecraft in general
- Starship analogs of oceanliners or airliners
- Intercontinental Earth-to-Earth spaceflight that enters outer space on the journey, such as is proposed for the SpaceX BFR spaceship

== See also ==
- Spaceline (disambiguation)
- Starliner (disambiguation)
