= Full-size Ford =

Overview
- Manufacturer: Ford
- Production: 1908–2019

Body and chassis
- Class: full-size car
- Layout: rear-wheel drive, body-on-frame (1908–2011) front-wheel drive/all-wheel drive (2005–2019)
- Body styles: Sedan; Station wagon Coupe; Convertible; Pickup truck Coupe utility

Powertrain
- Engines: I4 (1908-1934, 2014-2017); I6 (1935-1972); V6 (2005-2019); V8 (1932–2012)
- Transmissions: 2-speed planetary 3-speed manual 4-speed manual 2-speed automatic 3-speed automatic 4-speed automatic 6-speed automatic

Full-size Ford is a term adopted for a long-running line of Ford vehicles with a shared model lineage in North America. Originating in 1908 with the Ford Model T, the line ended in 2019 with the Ford Taurus, as Ford withdrew from the full-sized sedan segment in North America. Across 111 years, 15 generations, and over 60 million examples of the model line were produced across over 50 model nameplates. By contrast, the longest-running single nameplate worldwide is the Chevrolet Suburban, in use since the 1935 model year.

While best known for its production as a four-door sedan, the model lineage supported a wide range of body configurations, including coupes, hard tops, convertibles, station wagons, and retractable hardtops. Prior to the 1948 model year, the Ford chassis was also the basis of Ford pickup trucks (which were replaced by the Ford F-Series). To different extents, Mercury and Lincoln shared either a body and/or chassis with full-sized Fords from the 1940s to the 2010s.

Alongside with its status as the physically largest sedan offered by Ford in North America, nearly the entire line shared a common design lineage, including a rear-wheel drive layout and body-on-frame construction (excepting the final Ford Taurus), a V8 engine was offered for nearly all generations. At the time of its 2012 model-year discontinuation, the Ford Crown Victoria was the final mass-produced sedan offered with a separate frame.

== Etymology ==
During the first half of the 20th century, American automobiles were typically identified by manufacturer and model year (such as a 1952 Ford). At the time, each manufacturer offered nearly the same range of body styles for each of their vehicle brands (e.g., Ford, Mercury, and Lincoln). To augment their brand lineups, automakers began to market their vehicle lines in multiple nameplates, distinguished by exterior and interior trim.

The term "full-size" came into use in the early 1960s, following the introduction of compact and intermediate sedans by American automakers (with Ford releasing the Ford Falcon, Ford Fairlane, and the later Ford Mustang). While not a size term relative to its predecessors, full-size indicated the largest and most complete sedan offered by Ford (at 134 inches long, the Model T was 6 inches shorter than the introductory 1976 Ford Fiesta).

== Design commonality ==
Following the production of the Model T nearly unchanged from 1908 to 1927, the introduction of the Model A marked the first of multiple generations of a common model lineage, keeping pace with contemporary technology and consumer tastes. With the introduction of its V8 engine, the 1932 Ford Model B/Model 18 became the first widely produced car line with the engine type. From the 1932 to 2012 model years, Ford offered a V8 in its full-sized cars (making it standard equipment from 1935 to 1940 and from 1973 to 2012).

Originating from the Model T, each generation of the model line shared a common chassis construction layout. Body-on-frame construction (various designs) was combined with a front-engine, rear-wheel drive powertrain and a live rear axle; the design is similar to many light trucks sold in North America. The sole exception is the Ford Taurus (which entered production as the 2005 Ford Five Hundred), which introduced unibody construction, four-wheel independent suspension, and front-wheel drive (optional all-wheel drive); for the first time since 1931, no V8 engine was offered. Similar in several dimensions in comparison to its Crown Victoria market predecessor, the Five Hundred/Taurus was larger than the market flagships produced by Ford of Europe (Ford Scorpio) and Ford Australia (Ford Fairlane/LTD).

=== Production figures ===
Production Figures (1908–1978)
Generation	Model T	Model A	Model B/Ford V8	1935 Ford	1937 Ford	1941 Ford	1949 Ford	1952 Ford	1955 Ford	1957 Ford	1960 Ford	Galaxie/LTD (two generations)	Total production
Production	15,006,449	4,849,340	1,109,714	1,751,031 (1935–1936)	2,380,980 (1937–1940)	1,996,696 (1941–1942) (1946–1948)	2,525,425 (1949–1951)	3,079, 025 (1952–1954)	2,827,849 (1955–1956)	3,977,846 (1957–1959)	4,138,182 (1960–1964)	10,288,996 (1965–1978)	53,931,533

Following the downsizing of the Ford LTD to the Panther platform for the 1979 model year, Ford produced over 5 million vehicles under the LTD, LTD Crown Victoria, Country Squire, Crown Victoria, Crown Victoria P71, and Crown Victoria Police Interceptor nameplates.

=== Police usage ===
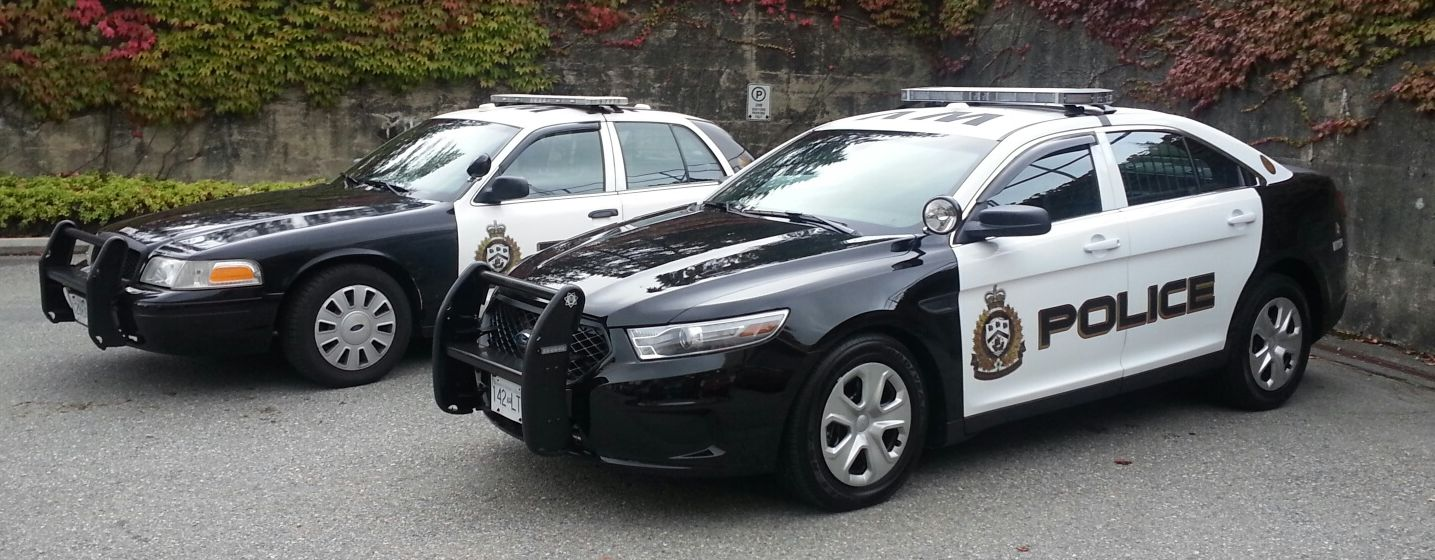
Ford Crown Victoria Police Interceptor and Ford (Taurus) Police Interceptor Sedan

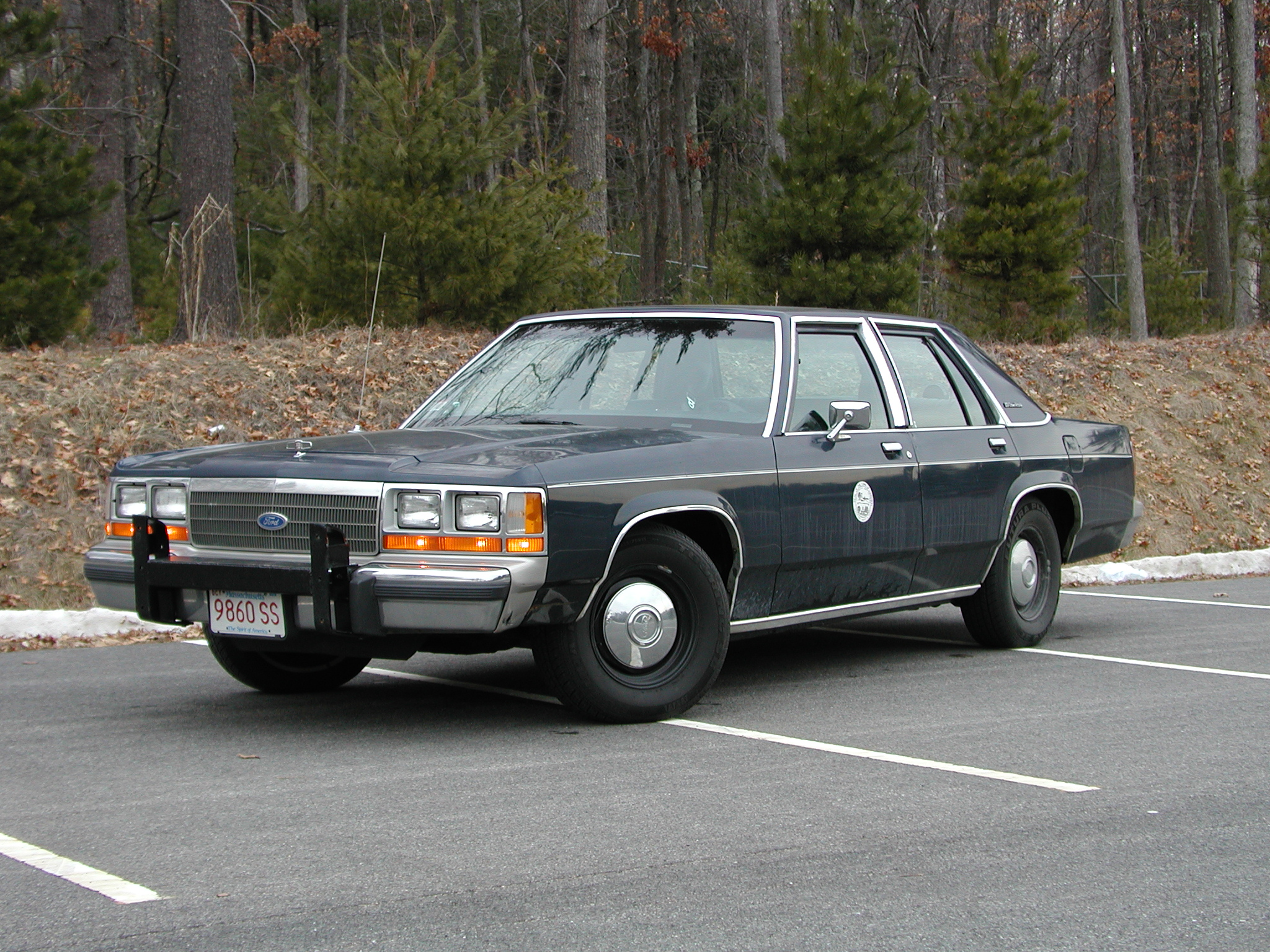
1990 Ford LTD Crown Victoria S unmarked police car (retired)

Following the 1932 introduction of the Ford V8, police forces of North America shifted preferences for police cars; the powerful V8 engine paired in a mass-market vehicle led police forces to end their usage of premium-brand (and higher-price) vehicles. Along with comparable sedans from AMC, Chrysler, and General Motors, the model line saw heavy use by police forces that desired robust body-on-frame construction, rear-wheel drive traction, and V8 engine power. In 1950, Ford introduced its first specialized option package for police cars; the package added heavy-duty components and an engine from the Mercury sedan.

Following the 1996 demise of the General Motors B platform (AMC ended production of large rear-wheel drive sedans in 1978, with Chrysler following suit in 1981), Ford held a virtual monopoly on police vehicles sold in North America into the 2010s. For 1992, the Ford Crown Victoria Police Interceptor became a distinct model line (not offered to the general public). The heavy-duty chassis of the model line proved popular among police forces during the 1990s, following the development of the PIT maneuver.

While the Ford Five Hundred was never offered as a police vehicle, the Ford Police Interceptor Sedan was introduced for 2013 (developed from the Taurus; the Police Interceptor Utility was developed from the Ford Explorer). Though the first Ford police car produced without rear-wheel drive or a V8 engine, the Police Interceptor Sedan was offered with two V6 engines (both more powerful than the previous V8); an optional twin-turbocharged V6 was shared with the Taurus SHO.

== First generation (1908–1927) ==
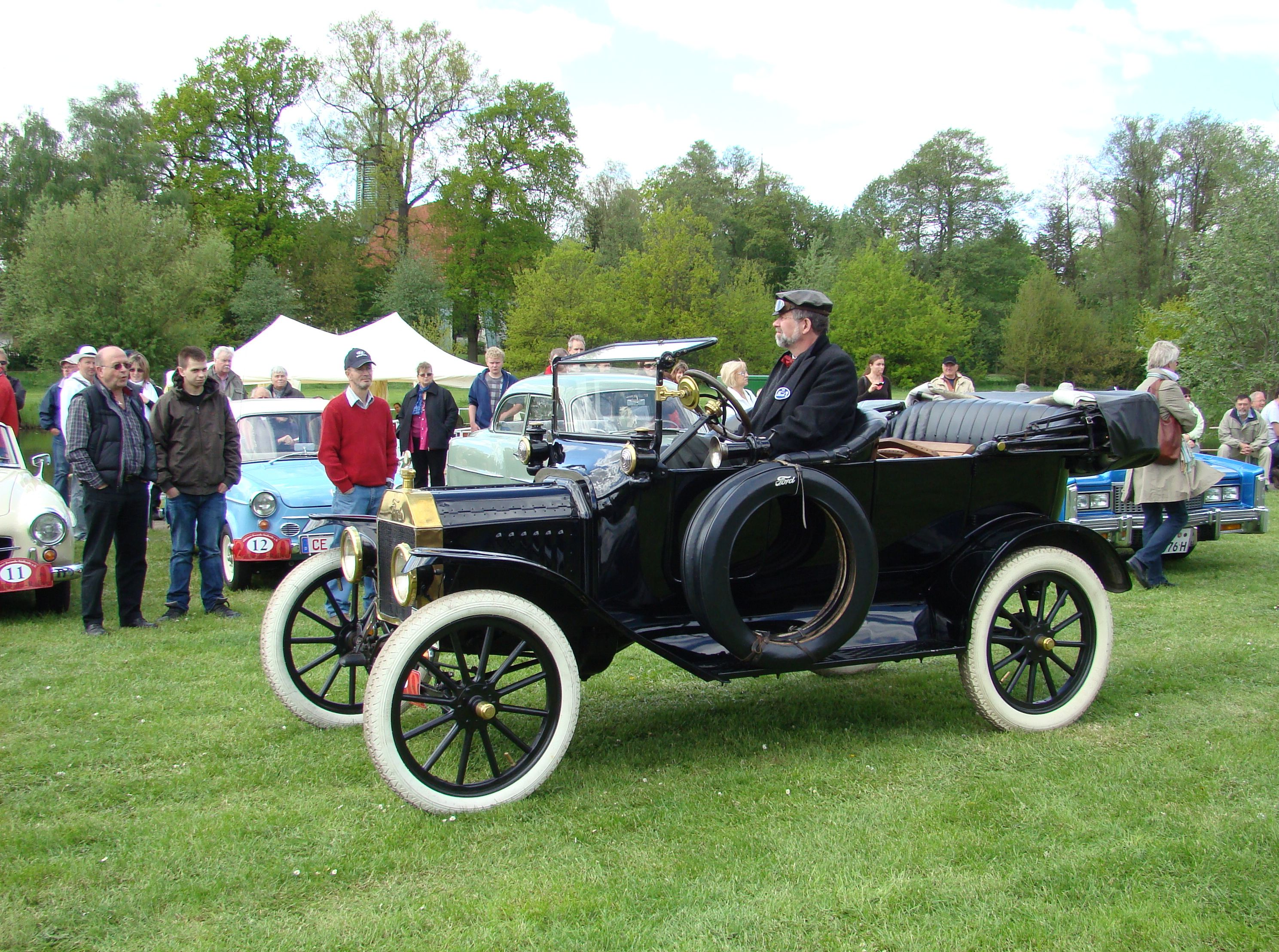
Model T (4-door touring)

In September 1908, the lineage of the full-sized Ford began as the Model T entered production. The successor to the Model N and Model S, the Model T would become the first Ford to use mass-production techniques. Produced in over 14 body styles, over 15 million were produced in 19 years of production. Although its predecessors introduced the front-engine, rear-wheel drive configuration to the company, the Model T was the first Ford produced in left-hand drive.

Throughout its production run, the Model T had relatively few changes. In addition to changes to refine its production (which dictated its specification of black paint), technological upgrades were made along the way. Ford added electric lights (in 1910), electric starting (1919), balloon tires (1925), and wire wheels (1926).

As the Model T aged in comparison to its competition, the market share held by Ford began to erode by the mid-1920s. At the end of 1927, the Model A was introduced as its replacement.

== Second generation (1927–1931) ==
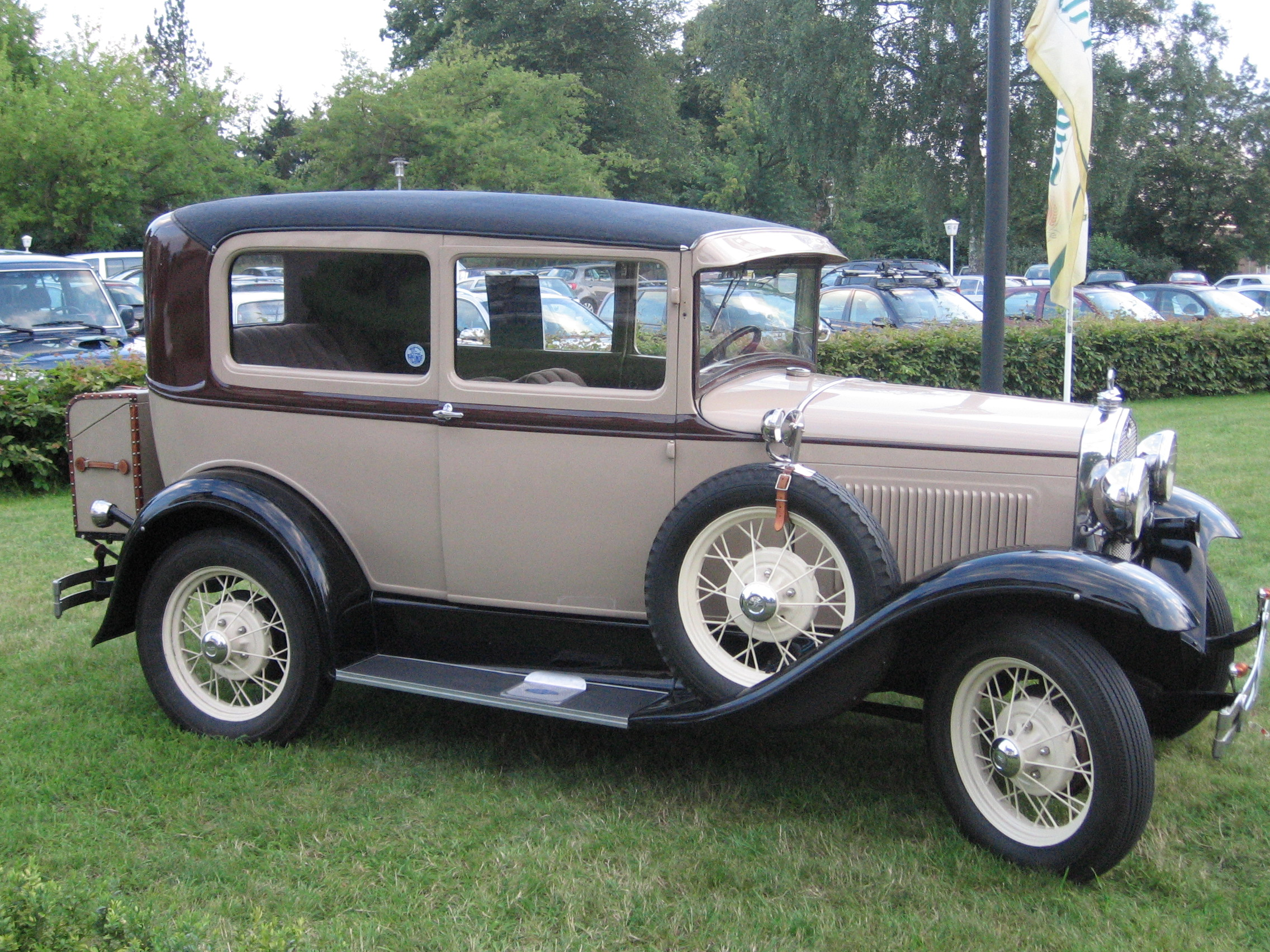
1930 Model A (Tudor sedan)

Introduced in December 1927, the Model A borrowed its name from the first car produced by the company in 1903. As with the Model T, the Model A used a front-engine, rear-wheel drive layout with body-on-frame construction; an all-new four-cylinder engine was introduced. As before, the Model A was produced in a wide variety of body styles; in contrast to its predecessor, the car's bodywork was designed by an in-house styling predecessor headed by Edsel Ford. Produced from 1927 to 1931, around 4.8 million were produced.

As the Model A was the first all-new design in 19 years, many features were upgraded. The Model A introduced Ford buyers to conventional driver controls; it now had pedals for the brakes, throttle, and clutch, as well as a separate gearshift. Safety glass made their automotive industry debut when Ford used it for the windshield.

== Third generation (1932–1934) ==
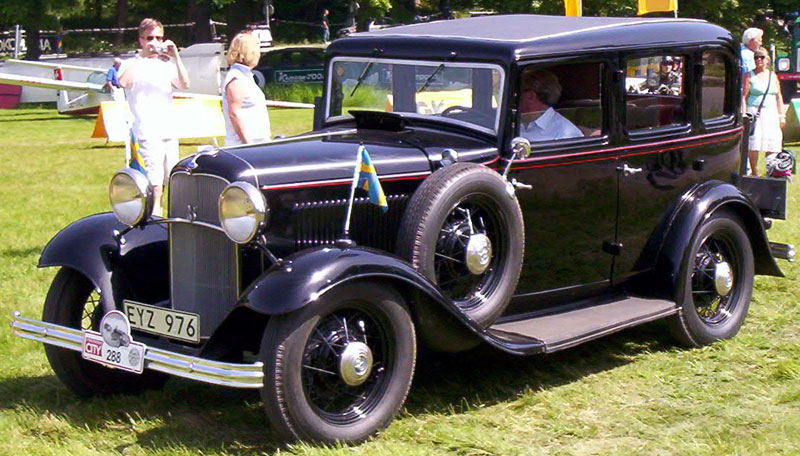
A 1932 Model 18 (V8) DeLuxe Fordor sedan

For the 1932 model year, Ford introduced a revised version of the Model A. The Model B was introduced with a modernized powertrain and chassis and slightly restyled bodywork. Only five years removed from the last Model T, the Model B introduced Ford and the entire automotive industry to yearly changes for model styling. In 1933, the exterior was redesigned, while the 1934 wore a new front end of its own; all three versions rode on the same basic chassis.

For 1932, Ford introduced an option that would remain in the full-sized Ford line for seven decades. Developed as a response to the 1929 introduction of the Chevrolet "Stovebolt Six", the Model 18 offered a 65-hp flathead V8 engine for a $10 price premium over the standard Model B. Demand for the V8 was so strong that Ford struggled to keep up. After 1934, the four-cylinder engine was discontinued; the next four-cylinder Ford in North America was the Pinto in 1971.

== Fourth generation (1935–1936) ==
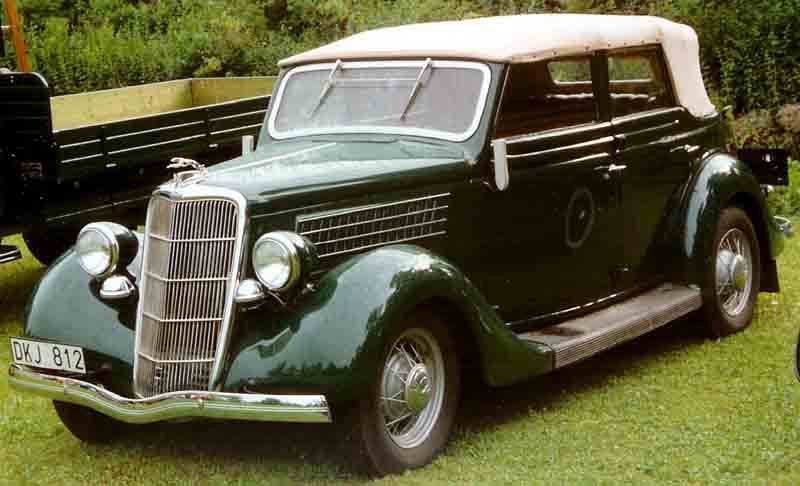
A 1935 Model 48 Convertible Sedan

For the 1935 model year, the Ford lineup was powered exclusively by a V8 engine. Styling changes introduced the first integrated trunks on sedan models and suspension changes increased interior room. In 1936, further updates included the introduction of solid wheels and the integration of the horn into the bodywork.

== Fifth generation (1937–1940) ==
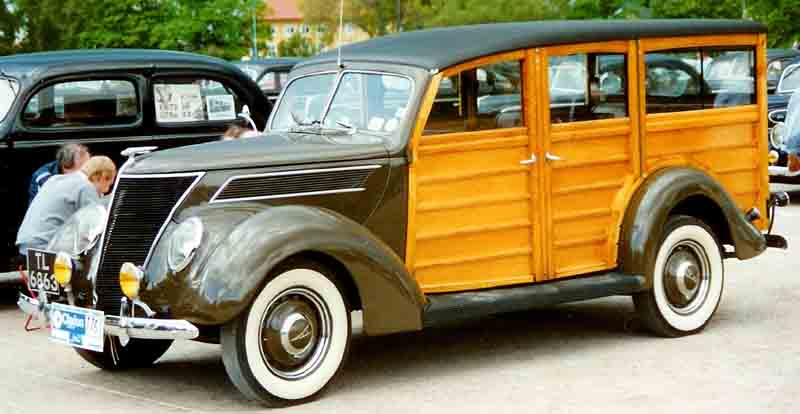
A 1937 Model 78 De Luxe Station Wagon

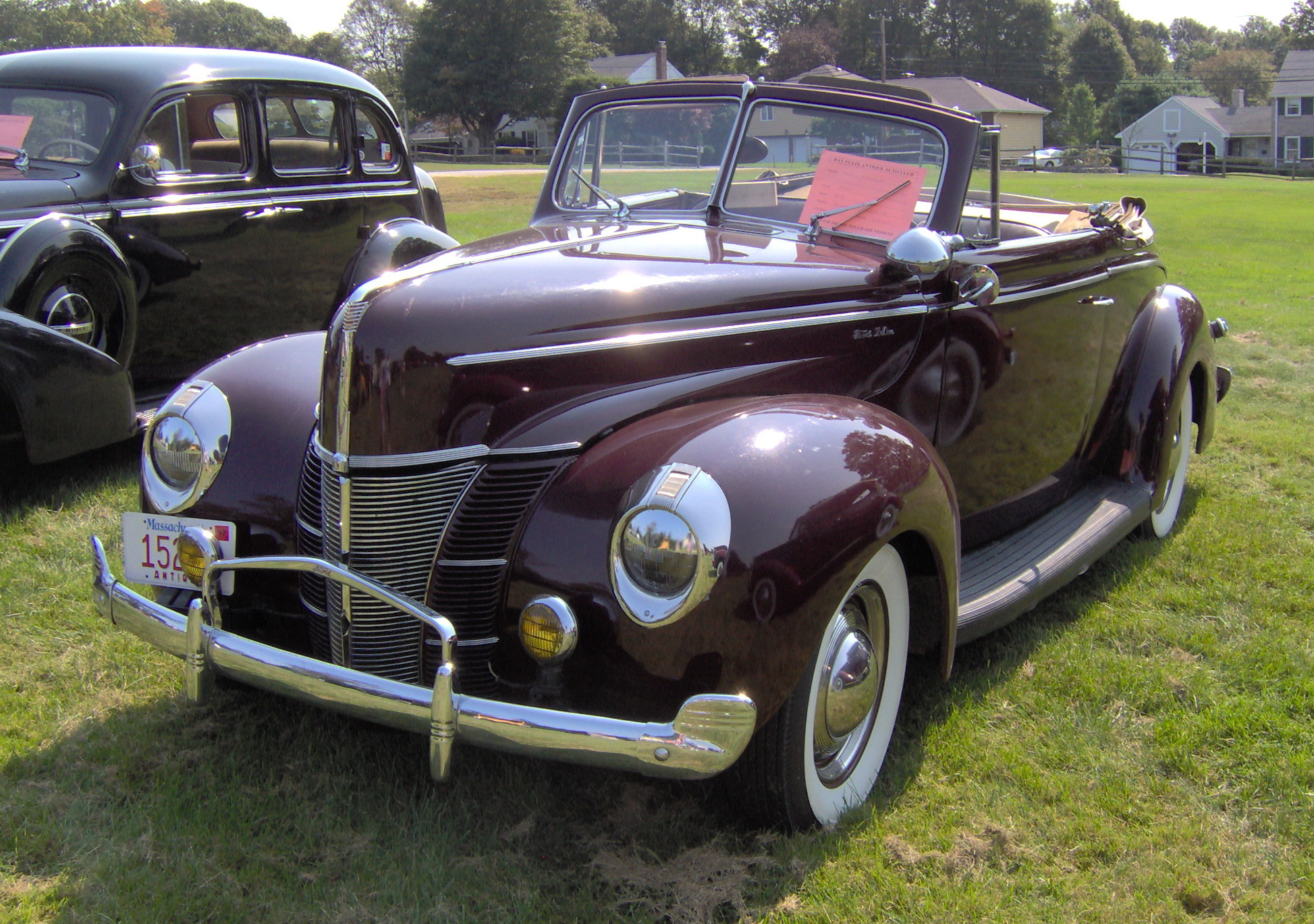
1940 De Luxe convertible

For 1937, Ford updated its car lineup with minor styling changes. However, the introduction of the De Luxe Ford marked the beginning of expansion of the Ford Motor Company brand lineup. De Luxe Ford was marketed as an upscale sub-brand to bridge the gap between Ford and Lincoln-Zephyr. In 1939, the Mercury was launched; although sharing a chassis with the Ford, its body was 6 inches wider with a wheelbase 4 inches longer; Mercury superseded De Luxe Ford as a brand.

As buyer tastes began to change in the late 1930s, certain body styles were pruned from the lineup; 1939 was the last year for the four-door phaeton and for single-seat coupes and convertibles (and their rumble seats). A conventional "alligator" hood replaced the "butterfly" hood with its lifting side panels. Ford made several safety-related changes, as well. The dashboard was redesigned (to feature recessed controls) in 1938, hydraulic brakes were added in 1939, and sealed-beam headlights were introduced a year later.

== Sixth generation (1941–1948) ==
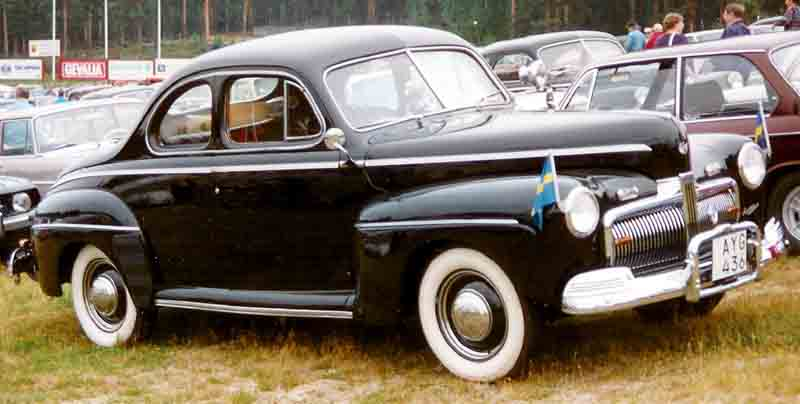
A 1942 Super Deluxe Coupe

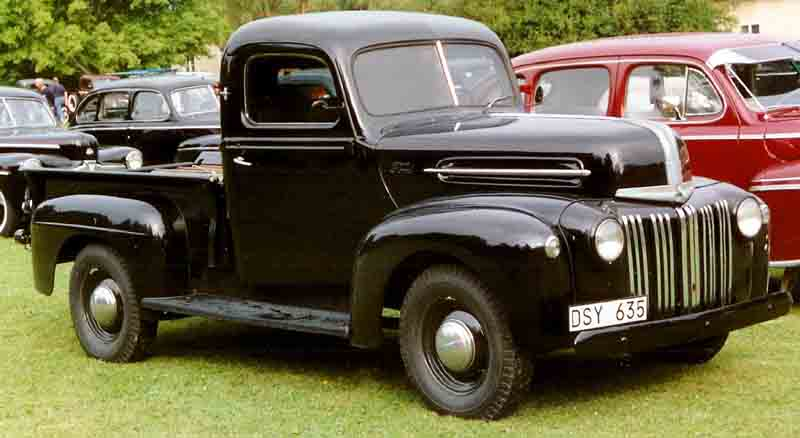
A 1946 Ford V8 pickup truck, the next-to-last year before Ford trucks were built on a dedicated platform

For 1941, Ford introduced an all-new generation of cars and trucks. These were the final generation of cars produced in the lifetimes of both Edsel Ford and Henry Ford. Due to the success of Mercury, De Luxe Ford was changed from a subbrand back to a trim level within the Ford lineup. The width of the body had now increased to the point where running boards had become vestigial. For the first time since the Model K of 1906, an inline-six engine was available (as a base engine).

From February 1942 to July 1945, civilian production was discontinued as Ford manufactured military products for World War II. As production resumed, Ford released the 1946 model with few changes aside from a new grille. Under the hood, the V8 engine was now shared with Mercury, allowing Ford to break the 100-hp barrier for the first time. In 1947, the last Ford trucks based on the car chassis were produced. For 1948, the F-Series was introduced as a dedicated truck chassis.

== Seventh generation (1949–1951) ==
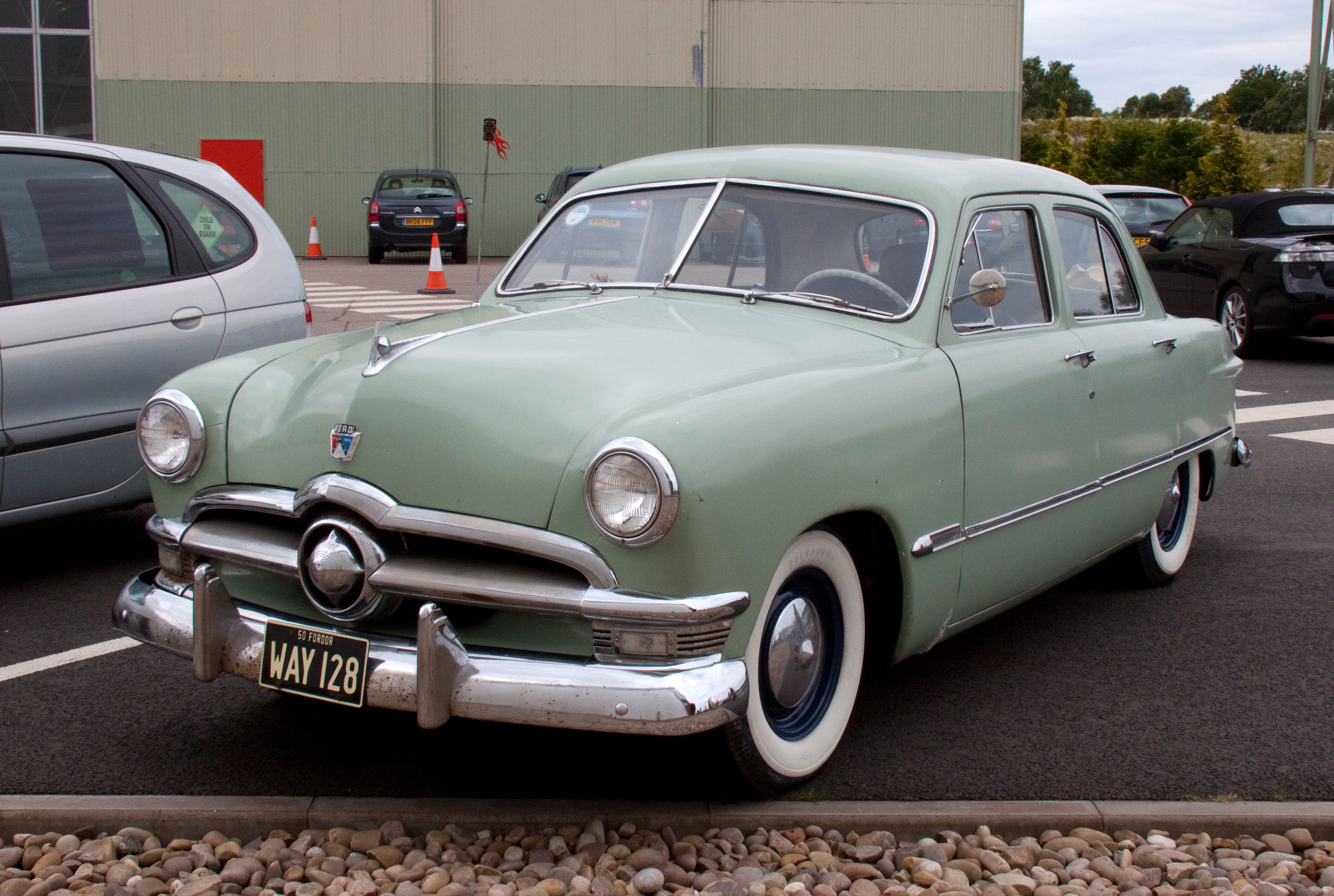
1950 Ford 4-door sedan

For the 1949 model year, Ford redesigned its car lineup with a number of significant changes. The transverse-leaf suspension, seen since the Model T, was replaced by independent front suspension and longitudinal leaf springs. Fenders and running boards were completely integrated into the bodywork.

In 1950, the Ford model line expanded itself further as the division added model names to the lineup (as opposed to Ford Standard or Ford Custom). A year later, an automatic transmission appeared for the first time. Wood-paneled station wagons were now available as Country Squire. Ford entered the youth market in 1951 with a new Victoria pillarless hardtop-convertible, a direct competitor to the Chevrolet Bel Air.

== Eighth generation (1952–1954) ==
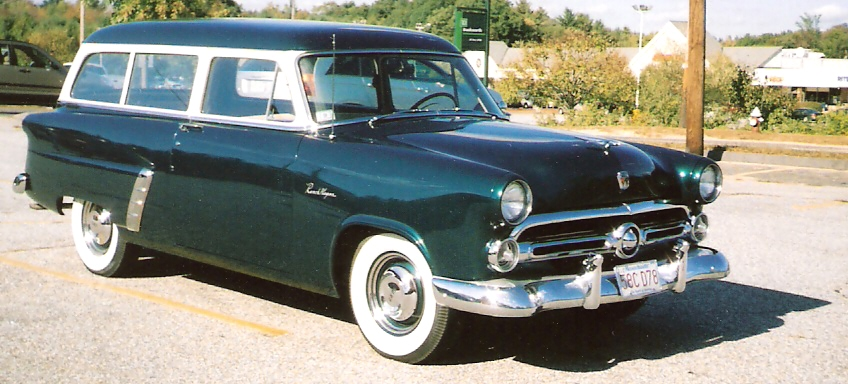
A 1952 Mainline two-door Ranch Wagon

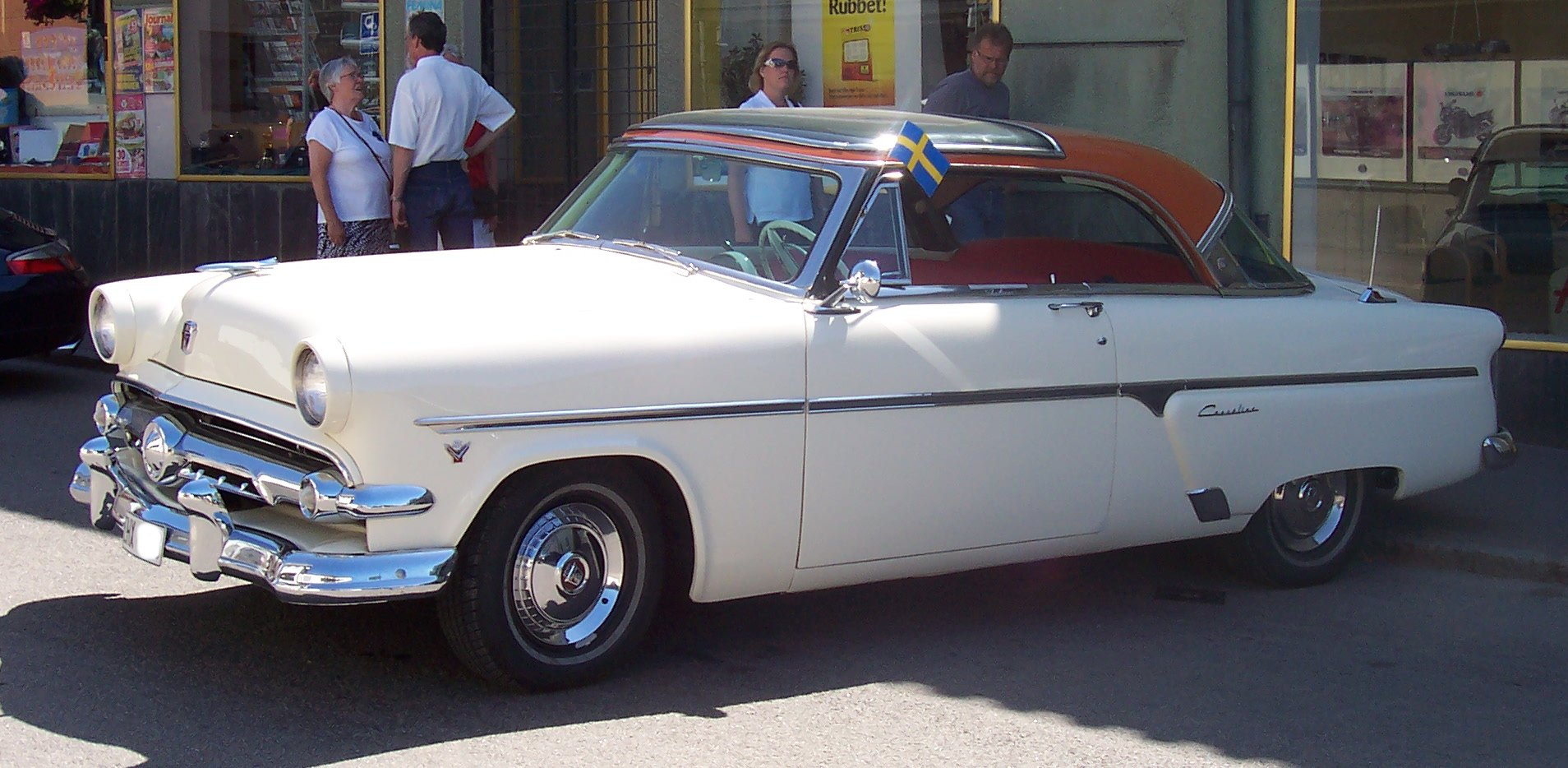
A 1954 Crestline Skyliner

For 1952, Ford updated its cars with mild exterior updates; this generation is distinguished by the introduction of a single-piece windshield. The pedals were remounted from the floor to below the dashboard.

Mechanically, power brakes and power steering became an option in 1954, and the overhead-valve Y-block V8 replaced the Flathead V8 seen since 1932. At 130 hp, the Y-block produced twice the horsepower as the original 1932 V8.

=== Nameplates ===
- Ford Mainline
  - Ranch Wagon
- Ford Customline
  - Country Sedan
- Ford Crestline
  - Sunliner
  - Victoria
  - Country Squire
- Ford Courier

== Ninth generation (1955–1956) ==
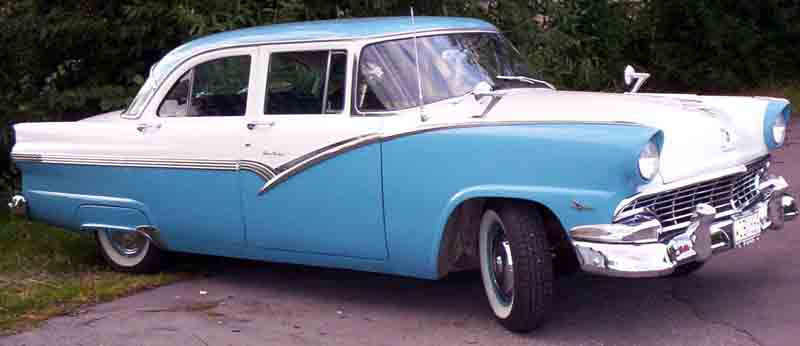
1956 Fairlane four-door sedan

In 1955, the Ford car lineup was given a mild update over the previous year, although several features made their first appearance in this generation. Air conditioning was now available as a factory-installed option. The Lifeguard option package, introduced in 1956, featured front and rear seat belts, a padded dashboard, and redesigned door latches. Although this was the first generation of Fords to undergo crash testing, the Lifeguard package was not well received by buyers. Several nameplates in the Ford lineup made their first appearance during this time. Ford introduced the Fairlane, Crown Victoria, and Ranch Wagon as part of the 1955 lineup. Station wagons were now a separate model series from two- and four-doors.

=== Nameplates ===
- Ford Mainline (1955–1956)
  - coupe utility (Australia only)
- Ford Customline (1955–1956)
- Ford Fairlane (1955–1956)
- Ford Ranch Wagon (1955–1956)
- Ford Crown Victoria/Crown Victoria Skyliner (1955–1956)
- Ford Courier (1955–1956)
- Ford Parklane (1956)

== Tenth generation (1957–1959) ==
For the first time since 1949, the 1957 Ford lineup was built on an all-new chassis; a new frame allowed for the use of lower-mounted bodies. As part of the convertible lineup, the Skyliner introduced a new feature: the retractable hardtop. The Ranchero, introduced in 1957, was the first coupe utility pickup sold in North America, antedating the Chevrolet El Camino by two years. The Ranchero was developed from the Courier sedan delivery with the bodywork above the cargo area removed.

In 1959, the Galaxie nameplate was introduced.

=== Nameplates ===
- Ford Custom (1957–1958)
- Ford Custom 300 (1957–1959)
- Ford Fairlane/Fairlane 500/Fairlane Skyliner (1957–1959)
- Ford Galaxie/Galaxie 500/Galaxie Skyliner (1959)
- Ford Courier (1957–1959)
- Ford Ranch Wagon (1957–1959)
- Ford Ranchero (1957–1959)
- Ford Del Rio (1957–1958)
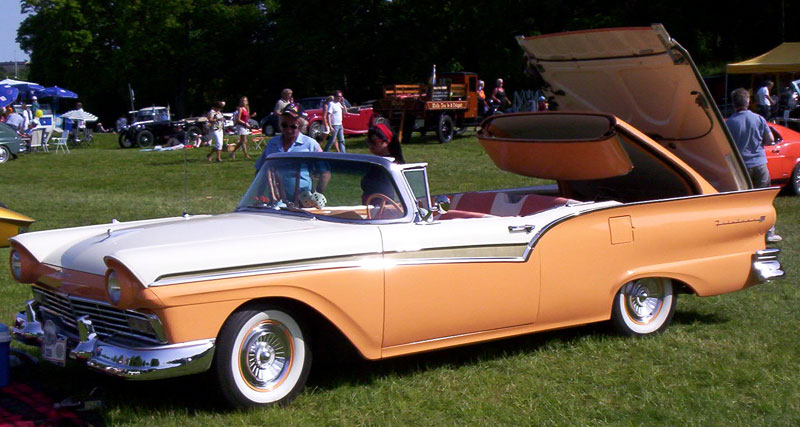
1957 Fairlane 500 Skyliner

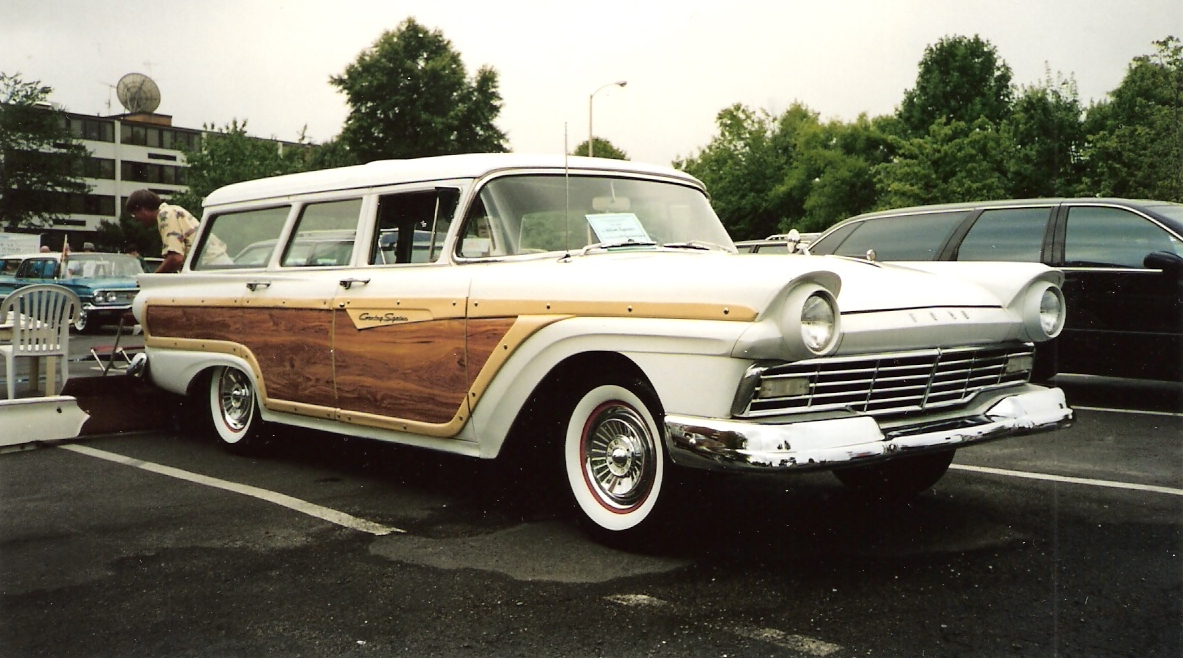
1957 Country Squire

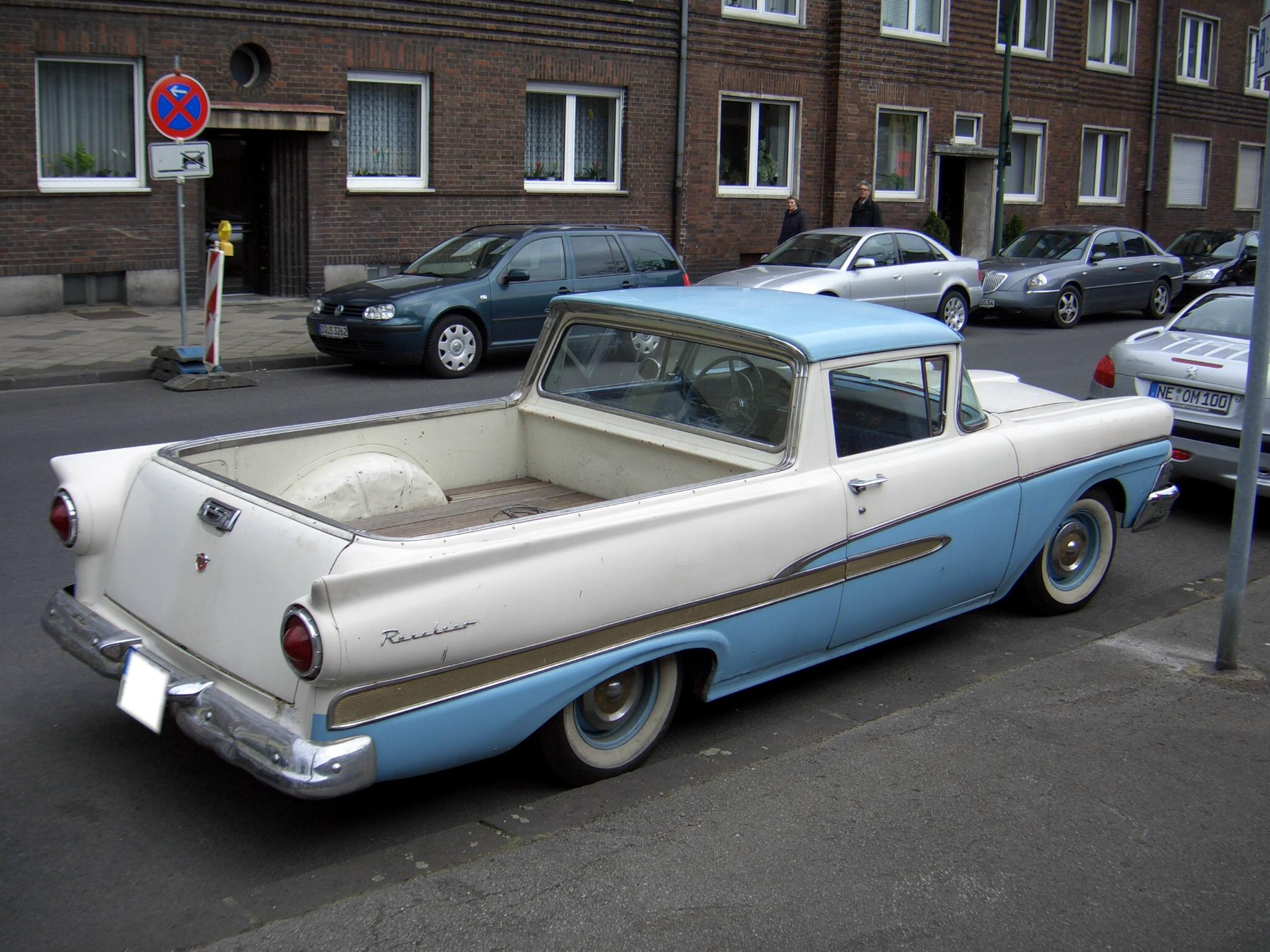
1958 Ranchero, rear 3/4 view

== Eleventh generation (1960–1964) ==
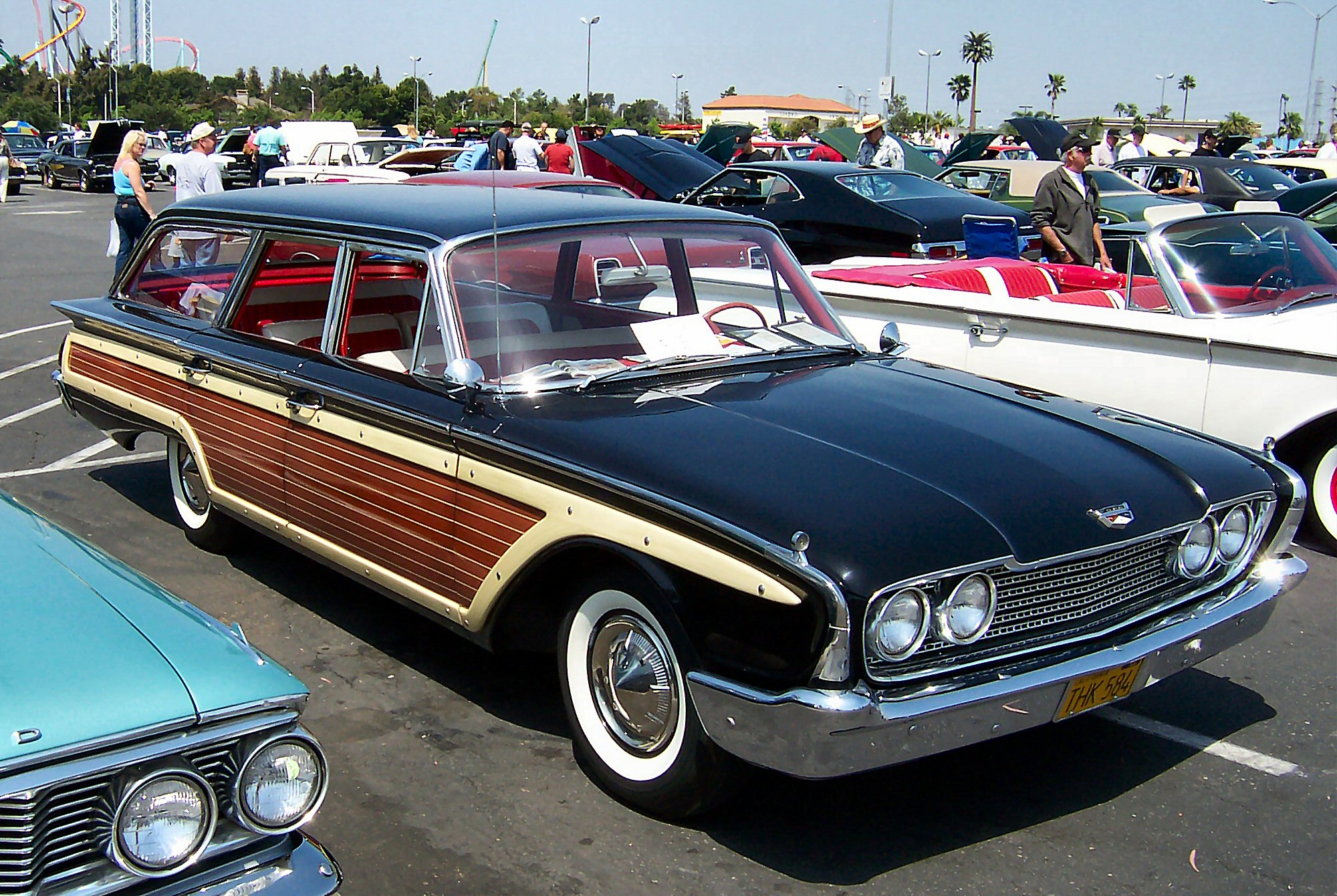
1960 Ford Country Squire

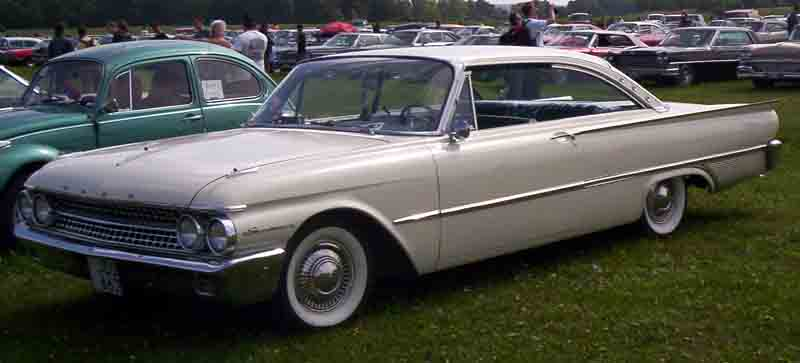
1961 Ford Galaxie Starliner

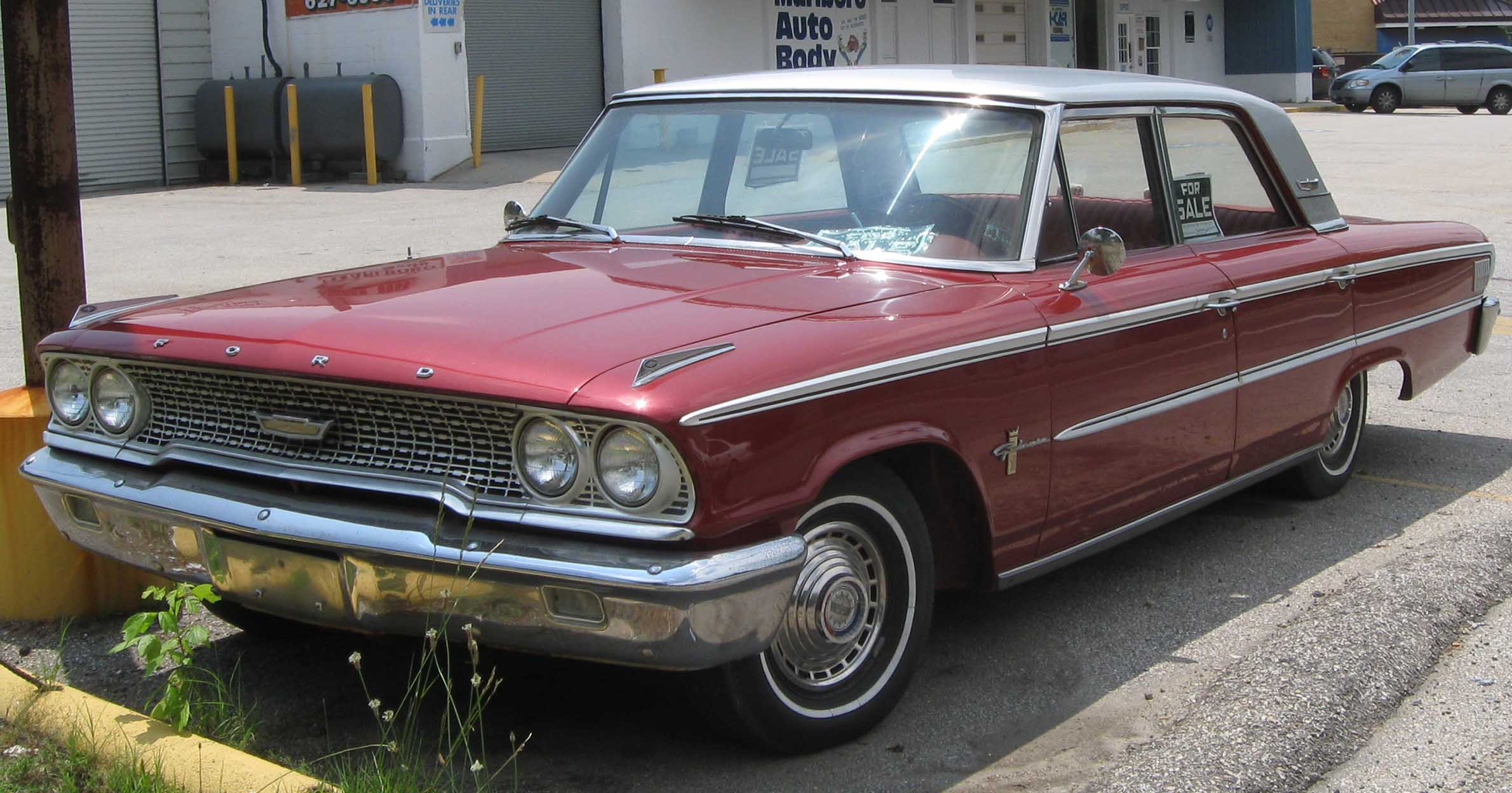
1963 Galaxie sedan

For 1960, the full-sized Ford chassis was lengthened by an inch to a 119-inch wheelbase. Coinciding with the redesign, a long-running precedent within Ford came to an end. Since the introduction of the Model T over a half-century before, Ford had largely produced a single model line of cars (as well as trucks, before 1948), with individual nameplates denoting a trim-level hierarchy. With the 1960 introduction of the Ford Falcon compact, the previous line of Fords (ranging from the Custom to the Galaxie and station wagons) became the full-sized Ford model range of cars. For 1962, Ford used the Fairlane nameplate for a third model range, sized between the Falcon and Galaxie (sharing components from both model lines); named an intermediate, the Fairlane was an ancestor of the mid-sized car segment of today.

Following the expansion of Ford chassis, several Ford body styles ended their production during this generation. Following a large decline in demand, 1960 marked the final year of the Ford Courier sedan delivery (largely replaced by the Ford Econoline van, derived from the Falcon) and 1961 marked the end of the full-sized two-door Ranch Wagon. The Ranchero shifted to the compact Falcon chassis for 1960, ending its commonality with full-sized Fords. For 1961, Mercury downsized its model line; in what would be a precedent through 1978, Mercury full-sized sedans became mechanical counterparts of the full-sized Ford, distinguished by a slightly longer wheelbase.

The 1960 Ford chassis received a number of drivetrain revisions. While 1960 had engines carried over from the previous generation, 1961 marked the first use of the long-running Windsor V8 engine family, with a 289 V8 replacing a 292 Y-block V8. The 390 FE-series V8 was introduced, marking the first big-block V8 (ranging from 352 to 427 cubic inches) in a Ford sedan.

=== Nameplates ===
The 1960 Ford saw several nameplate shifts. Following the discontinuation of the Custom/Custom 300, the Fairlane served as the standard Ford for 1960 and 1961. As a replacement for the Skyliner retractable hardtop, the Starliner fastback hardtop served as the flagship hardtop, with the Sunliner convertible making its return. For 1962, as the Fairlane was established as a free-standing model range, all full-sized Fords were Galaxies; with the introduction of the Galaxie 500 and Galaxie 500 XL submodels (replacing the Starliner/Sunliner), the bucket-seats-and-console 500 XL served as a competitor to the Chevrolet Impala Super Sport. As a base model for fleets, for 1963, Ford introduced the Ford 300, which was renamed the Custom for 1964.

The three-model station wagon series remained unchanged from 1960 to 1962. For 1963, the base-trim Ranch Wagon was adopted by the Fairlane model range.

- Ford Fairlane (1960–61)
- Ford Galaxie (1960–64)
  - Ford Starliner/Sunliner (1960-1961)
  - Ford Galaxie 500/500XL (1962-1964)
- Ford Ranch Wagon (1960–62)
- Ford Country Sedan (1960–64)
- Ford Country Squire (1960–64)
- Ford Courier (1960)
- Ford 300 (1963)
- Ford Custom (1964)

== Twelfth generation (1965–1968) ==
For the 1965 model year, the full-sized Ford platform underwent a complete redesign. While sharing the 119-inch wheelbase of the previous generation, Ford redesigned the frame and suspension in an effort to upgrade ride and handling. The longitudinal rear leaf springs (used since 1949) were replaced by a three-link coil-sprung live rear axle. In modified form, the design was used through the production of the 1979-2012 Panther chassis (and the Ford Aerostar van).

To comply with federal safety mandates, in 1967 the full-sized Fords were updated with a padded dashboard, recessed controls, collapsible steering column with padded steering wheel, and three-point seatbelts; 1968 models gained side marker lights. For 1968, the front fascia underwent a revision, shifting from vertically stacked headlights to horizontally mounted headlamps; the XL, LTD, and Country Squire were given hidden headlamps.

=== Nameplates ===
The 1965 Ford line gained the Ford LTD. Initially a 1965 submodel of the Galaxie 500, the LTD became a full model line for 1966. Adopting many of the convenience features available on a Lincoln or Mercury, the Ford LTD was introduced before or alongside sedans such as the Chevrolet Caprice and Dodge Monaco. The Ranch Wagon returned to the station-wagon line, based upon the Custom.

For 1967, the Ford Galaxie 500 XL was rebranded as the Ford XL (sportiest of the full-sized Ford line).

- Ford Custom/Custom 500 (1965–1968)
- Ford Galaxie (1965–1968)
  - Galaxie 500 (1965-1968)
  - Galaxie 500 LTD (1965)
  - Galaxie 500/500XL (1965–1966)
    - Ford XL (1967–1968)
- Ford LTD (1966–1968)
- Ford Ranch Wagon (1965-1968)
- Ford Country Sedan (1965–1968)
- Ford Country Squire (1965–1968)
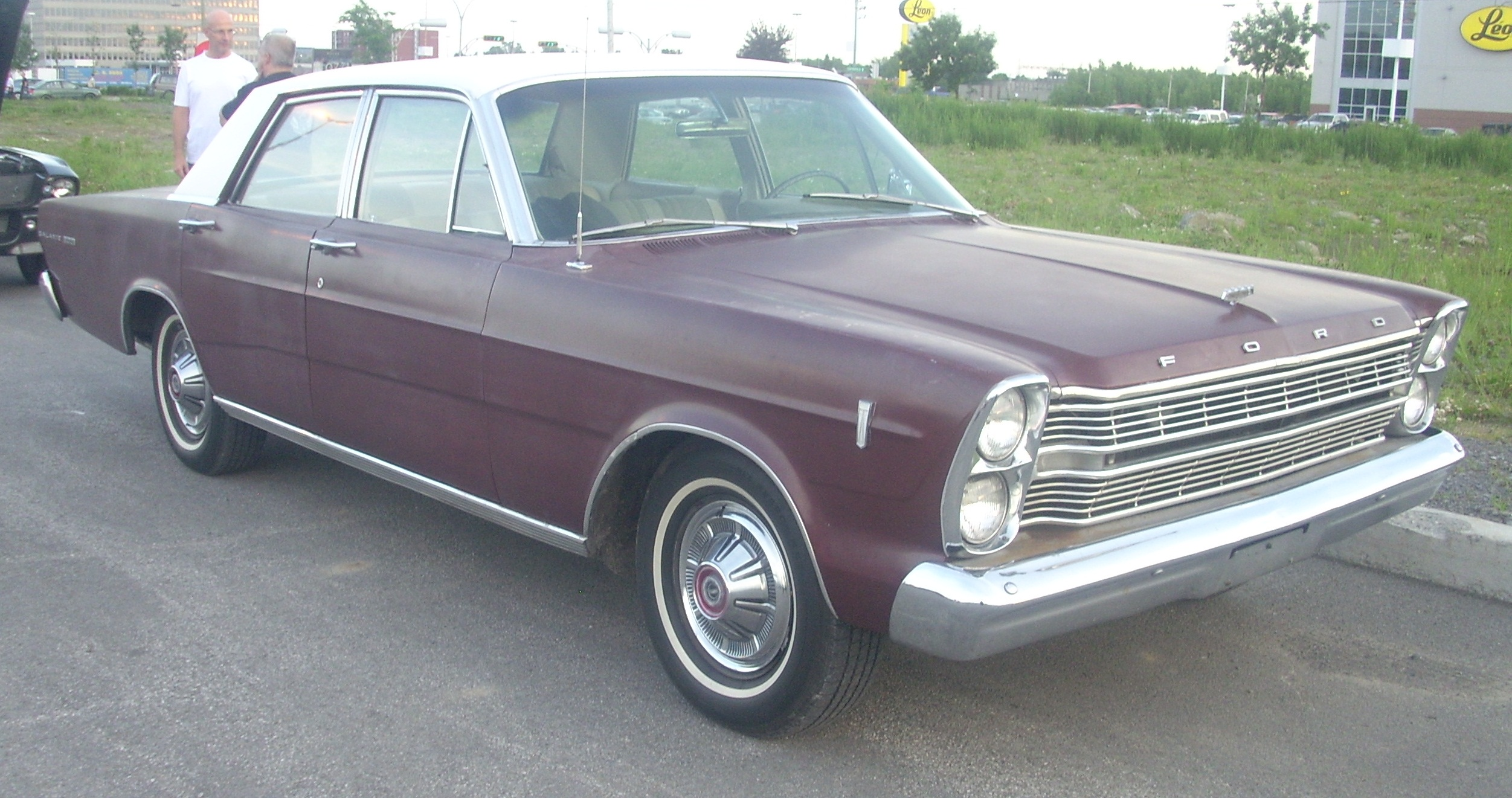
1966 Galaxie 500 4-door sedan

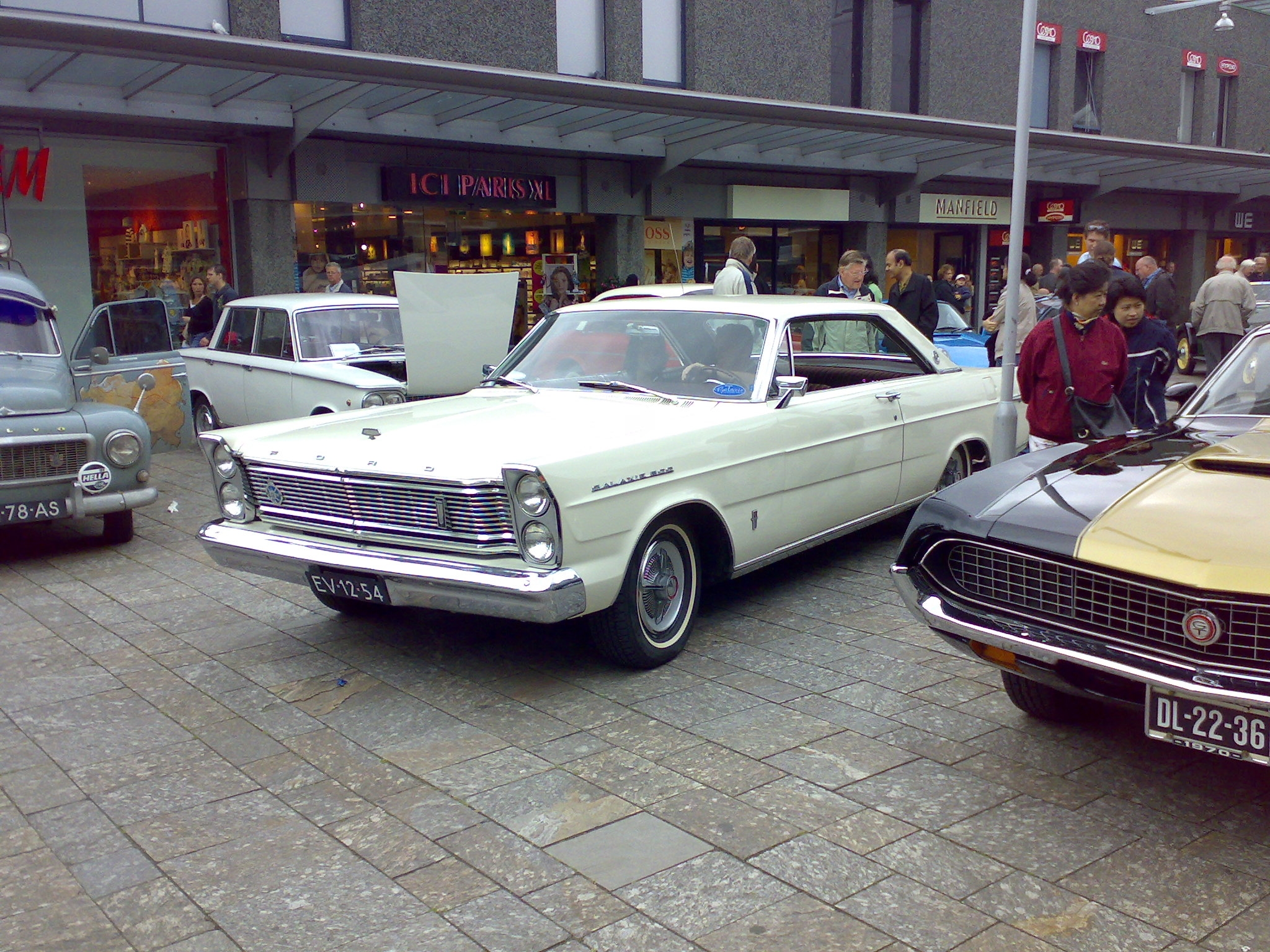
1965 Galaxie 500 LTD 2-door hardtop coupe

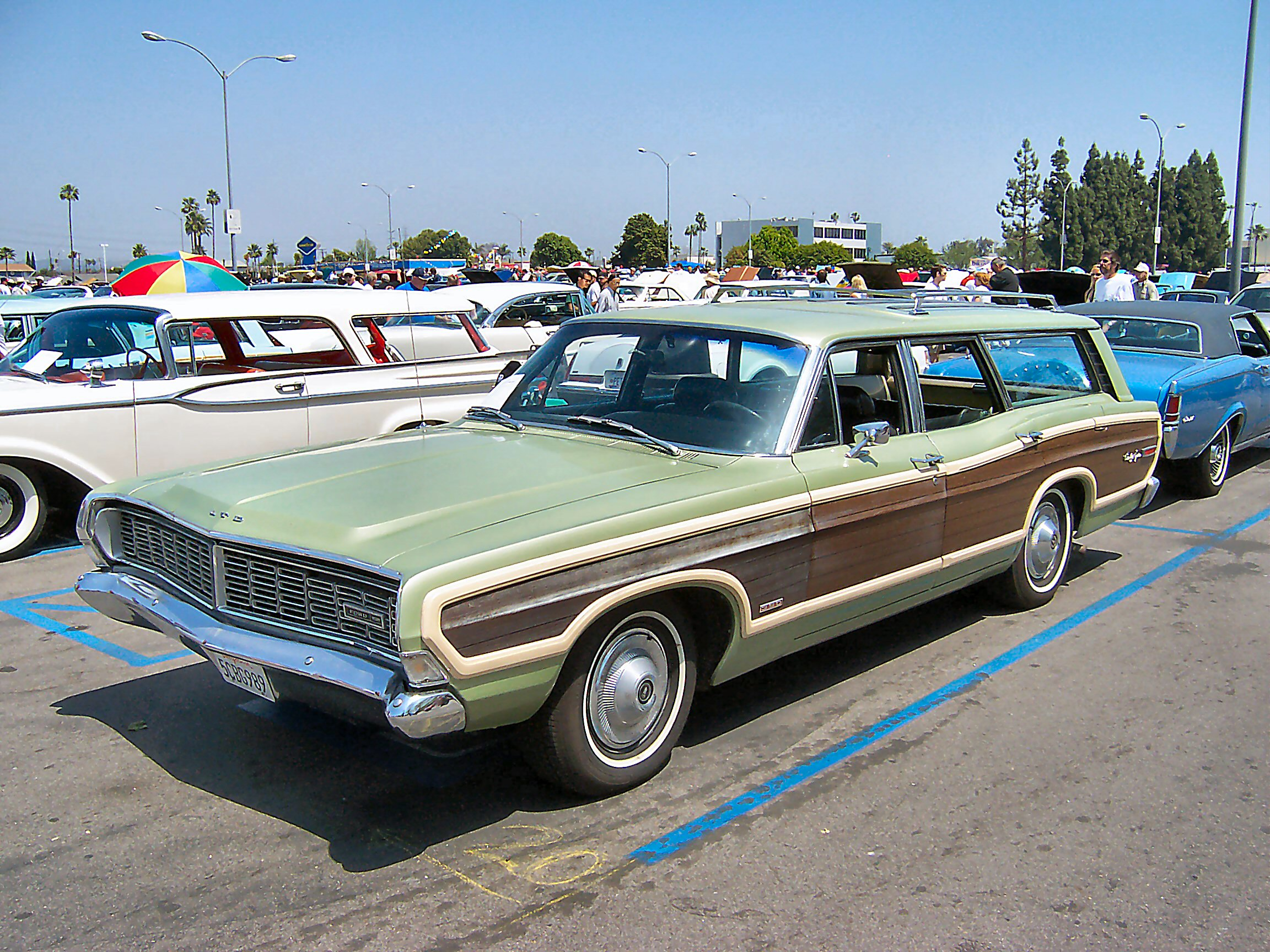
1968 LTD Country Squire station wagon

== Thirteenth generation (1969–1978) ==
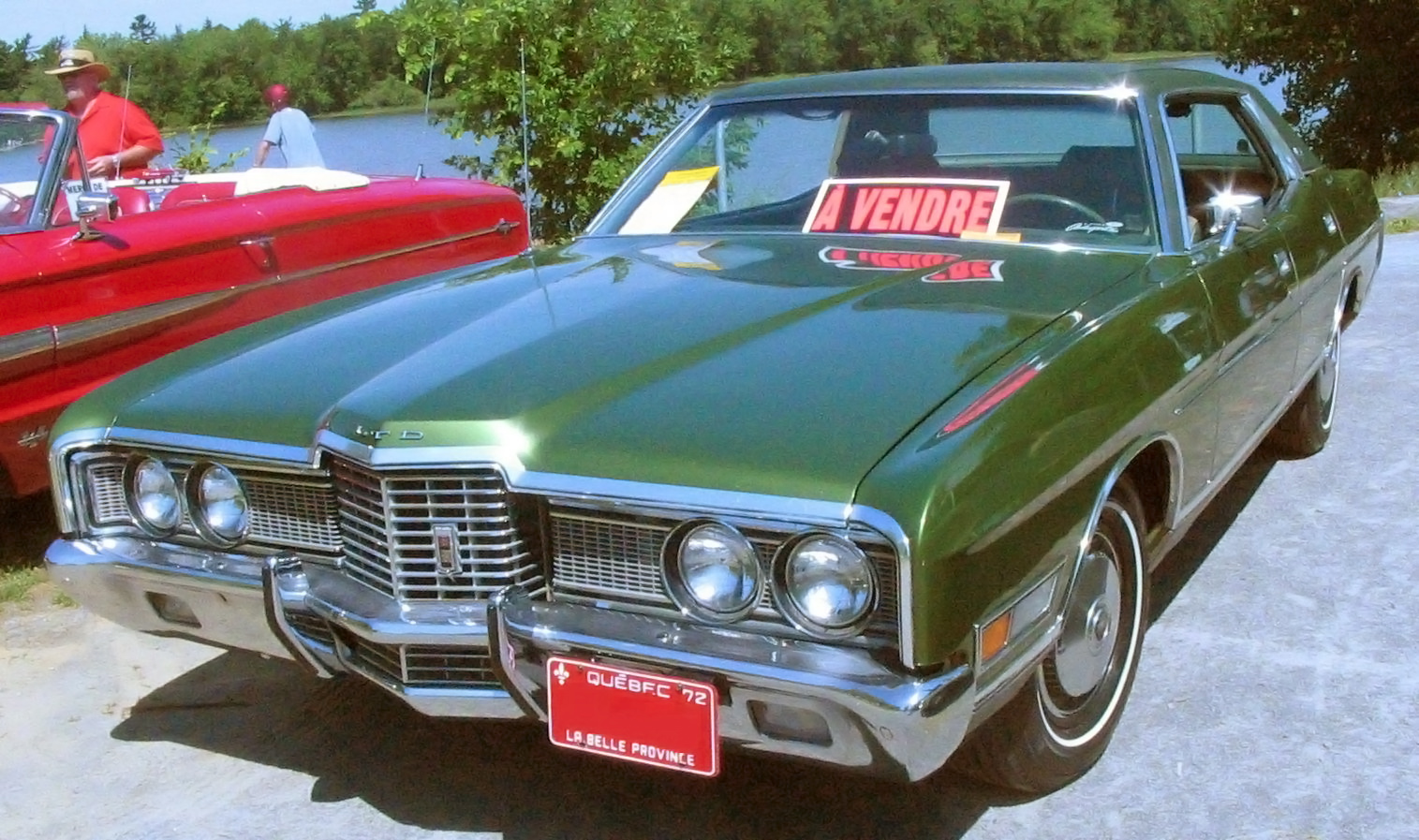
1972 LTD 4-door Hardtop

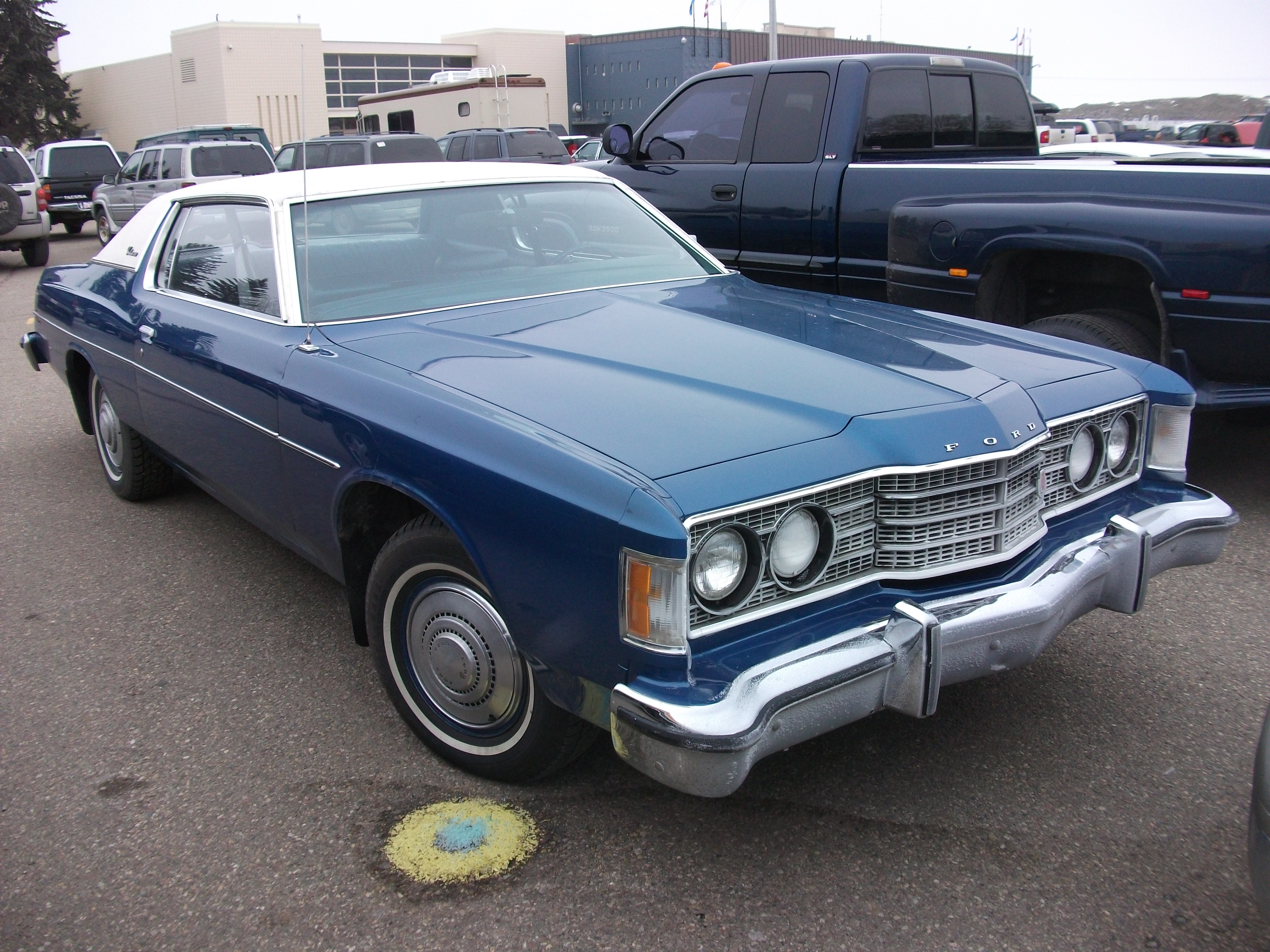
1974 Galaxie 500 2-door Hardtop

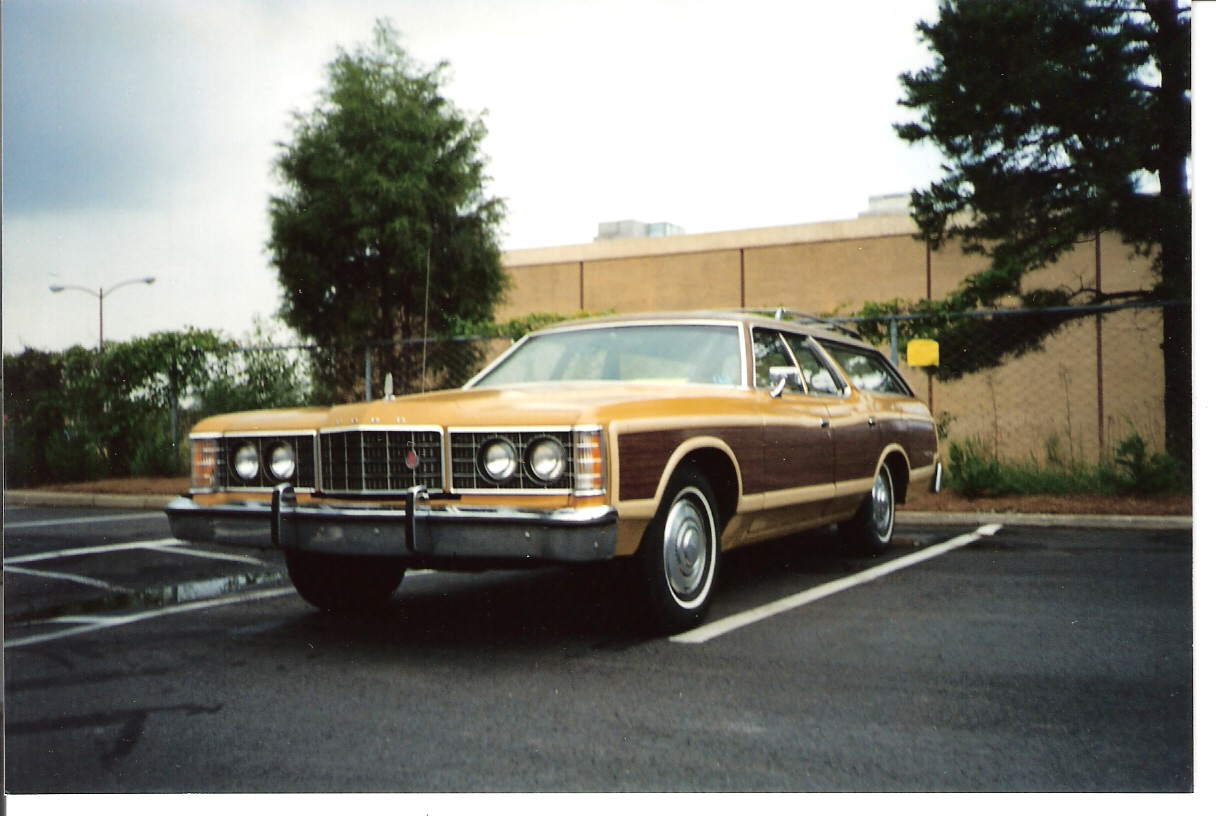
1973 LTD Country Squire

For 1969, the full-sized Ford line was given a redesign. Expanding to a 121-inch wheelbase, the all-new chassis shared a similar suspension configuration as the previous generation. In a marketing change, Ford streamlined its full-sized line, integrating station wagon and sedan nameplates.

Alongside traditional differences between grilles and trim, Ford designers began to further distinguish each full-sized model range from each other. While Customs and Galaxies were fitted with exposed headlamps (shifted from vertically stacked to horizontal), XLs and LTDs adopted the hidden headlamps (offered by Lincoln-Mercury). The XL and Galaxie 500 SportsRoofs were fastbacks, sharing a roofline with the Mercury Marauder; standard Galaxie 500s and LTDs used a formal hardtop roofline.

During the early 1970s, the model line underwent a transition. After 1970, the XL was discontinued, as demand for high-performance vehicles shifted further away from full-sized vehicles. A minor revision of the exterior was introduced for 1971; while the tradition of Ford round/square brake lights was ended, the LTD became one of the first cars equipped with a third brake light (a feature dropped in 1973), and 1972 marked the final year for the long-running Custom and the LTD convertible.

For 1973, the full-sized line underwent a redesign of the body. To accommodate federal regulations, the front fascia was fitted with large 5 mph bumpers (rear versions were added for 1974). While Lincoln-Mercury retained hardtop rooflines, Ford added thick B-pillars and fixed rear quarter windows to its two-door coupes. Four-door sedans and station wagons became "pillared hardtops"; while still using frameless door glass, the roofline was reinforced with thin metal B-pillars. To accommodate the growth in size, V8 engines became standard, ranging up to 7.5 L (460 cubic inches); in another change, automatic transmissions also became standard equipment.

As the 1970s progressed, Ford gradually consolidated its full-sized range under the LTD nameplate (which included the Country Squire station wagon). After 1974, the Galaxie was discontinued (along with the Country Sedan station wagon); the Custom 500 was largely relegated to fleet and police sales.

Second only in production to the Model T, about 7,850,000 examples of the 1969-1978 full-sized Ford/Mercury platform were produced; the Fords on a 121 in (3.07 m) wheelbase, and the variously named Mercurys (except their wagons) on a more luxurious 124 in (3.15 m) wheelbase.

=== Nameplates ===
- Ford Custom/Custom 500 (1969–1978)
- Ford LTD (1969–1978)
- Ford XL (1969–1970)
- Ford Galaxie/Galaxie 500 (1969–1974)
- Ford Country Sedan (1969–1974)
- Ford Country Squire (1969–1978)
- Mercury Marquis
- Mercury Monterey, and others

== Fourteenth generation (1979–2011) ==
Necessitated by the implementation of American federal fuel economy standards (CAFE), Ford introduced an all-new full-sized line for 1979. In line with General Motors, Ford underwent downsizing, losing 15 inches of length and 800 pounds of curb weight; the 1979 LTD received smaller exterior dimensions than the midsized LTD II. In spite of its smaller size, the redesign led to increased interior and trunk space. The all-new Panther chassis remained rear-wheel drive, and retained the standard V8 engine power.

As the LTD was introduced, Ford began development on its intended replacement, the front-wheel drive Ford Taurus. As fuel prices stabilized and demand for full-sized cars remained, Ford made the decision to continue to produce the Panther platform alongside the Taurus. In a rebranding of the model line, the Custom 500 was dropped in the United States (ending altogether in Canada in 1981). In 1983, as part of a major model shift throughout Ford Motor Company, the LTD and LTD Crown Victoria were split apart. The LTD Crown Victoria (and the Country Squire) became the sole full-sized cars, while the LTD nameplate took over for a facelifted version of the slow-selling Granada sedan.

For 1992, the Crown Victoria was introduced (dropping the LTD prefix); the Country Squire station wagon was discontinued. As part of a substantial upgrade of the Panther chassis, the Crown Victoria adopted a ground-up redesign of the exterior (influenced by the first-generation Taurus). The redesign included four-wheel disc brakes, antilock brakes, and dual airbags; the long-running 5.0 L V8 was replaced by a 4.6 L V8, the first overhead-cam V8 offered in an American full-sized sedan. The Ford Crown Victoria Police Interceptor was introduced as a purpose-built police vehicle, including upgraded suspension and drivetrain components; the distinct model was not offered for retail sale.

The Crown Victoria underwent a single exterior revision for 1998 model year, adopting the formal rear roofline of the Mercury Grand Marquis and minor revisions to the front and rear fascias. For the 2003, the Panther chassis underwent an update to the frame and suspension, improving the handling of the model line.

While well supported by fleet and police sales, Ford ended retail sale of the Crown Victoria, effectively replacing the model line between the Taurus and the Grand Marquis. Following the 2011 model year, it was no longer legal for sale in North America (as the model was designed without stability control). Following a short run of 2012 production destined entirely for export to Saudi Arabia, the final Ford Crown Victoria was produced on September 15, 2011.

=== Nameplates ===
- Ford LTD (1979–1982)
- Ford Custom 500 (1979–1981, Canada)
- Ford LTD Crown Victoria (1983–1991)
- Ford Country Squire (1979–1991)
- Ford Crown Victoria (1992–2012)
- Ford Police Interceptor (1999–2011)

=== Concept cars ===
- The 1993 Aston Martin Lagonda Vignale used an extended Panther chassis (Lincoln Town Car)
Full-size

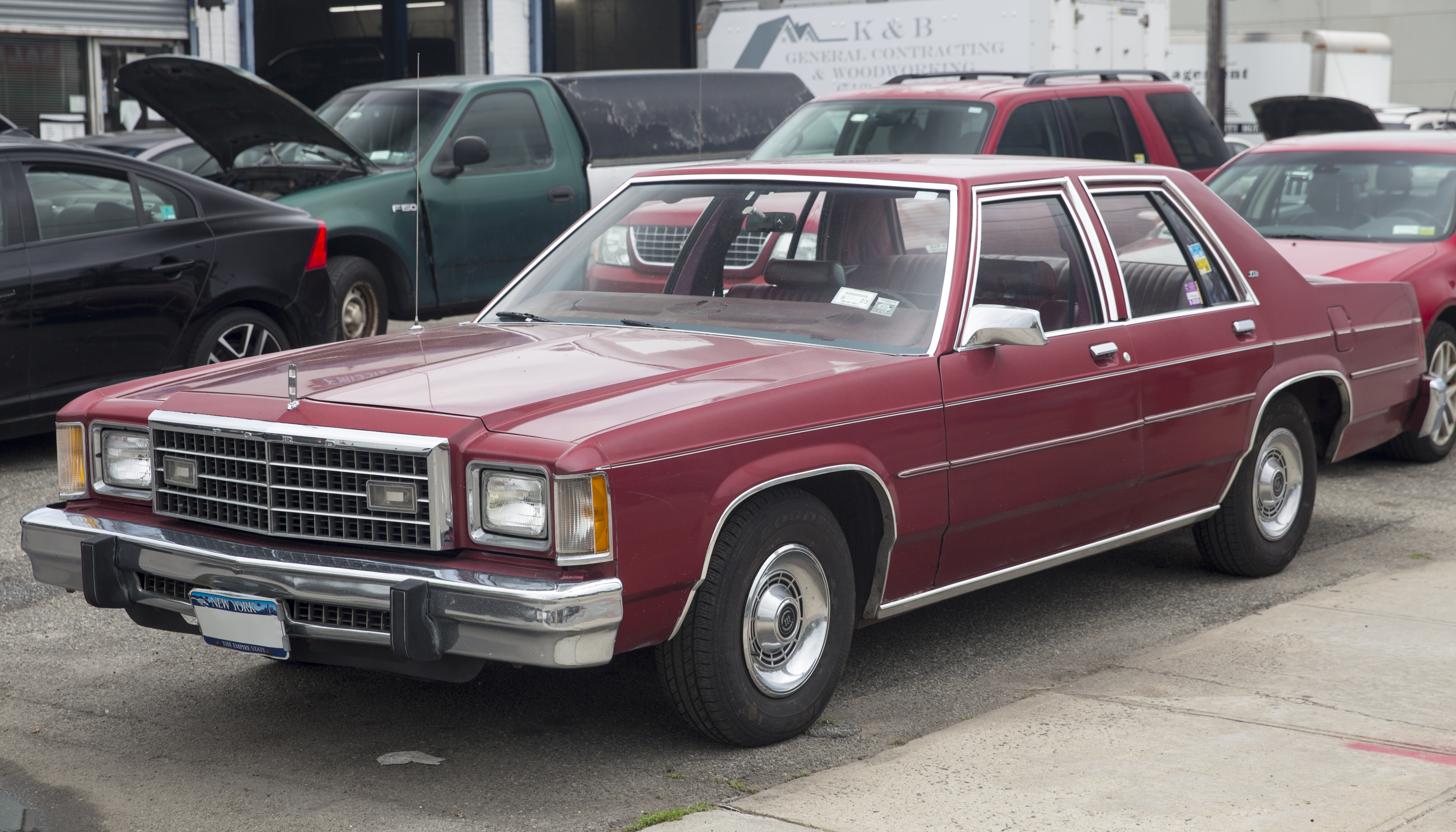
1979 Ford LTD

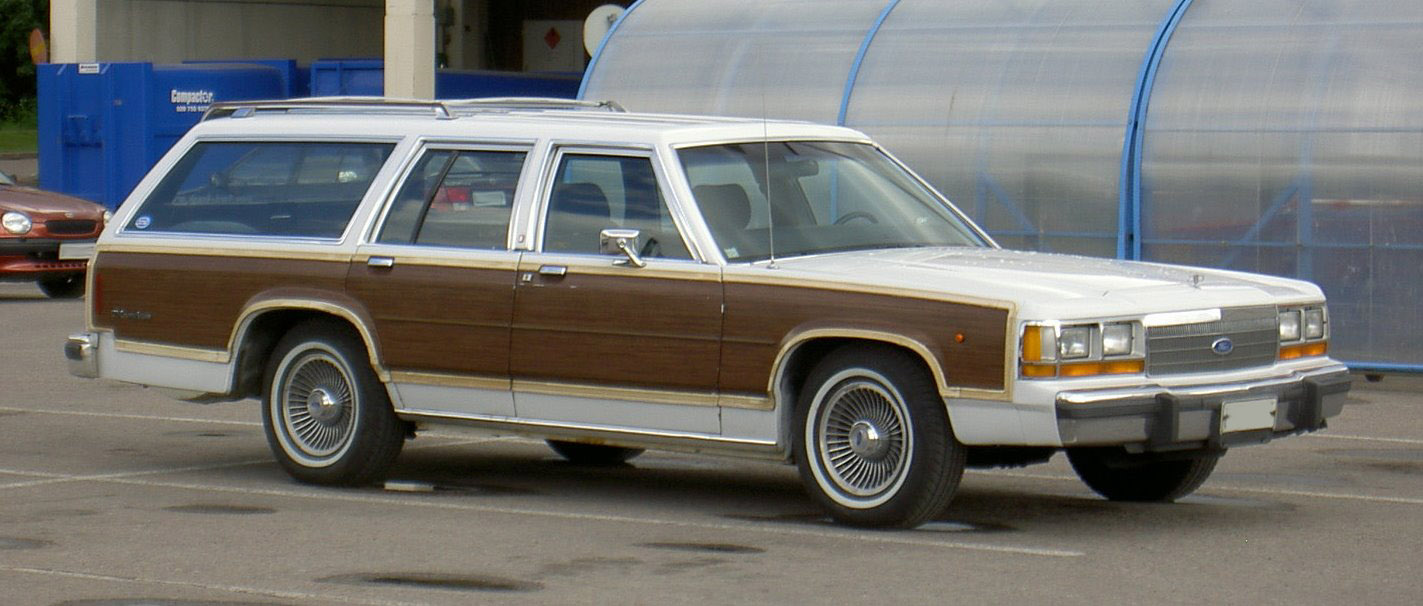
A 1988-1990 LTD Country Squire, 1991 was the final year of station wagon production

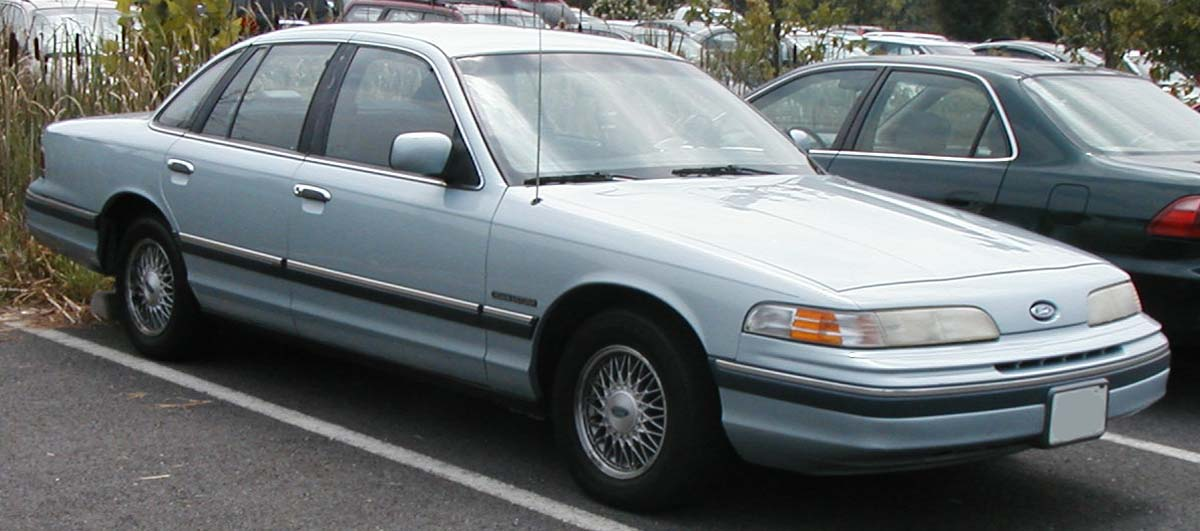
1992 Crown Victoria

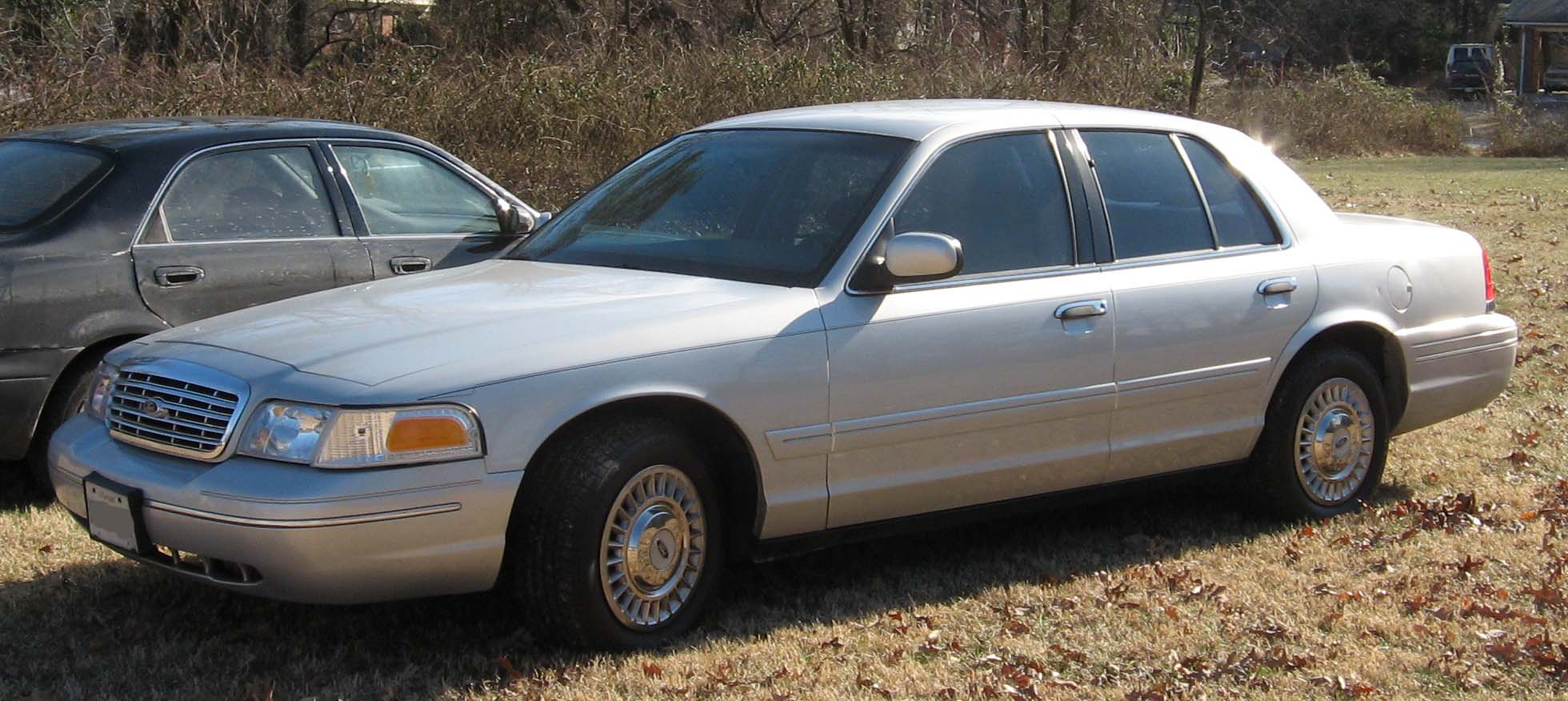
1998-2002 Crown Victoria

== Fifteenth generation (2005–2019) ==
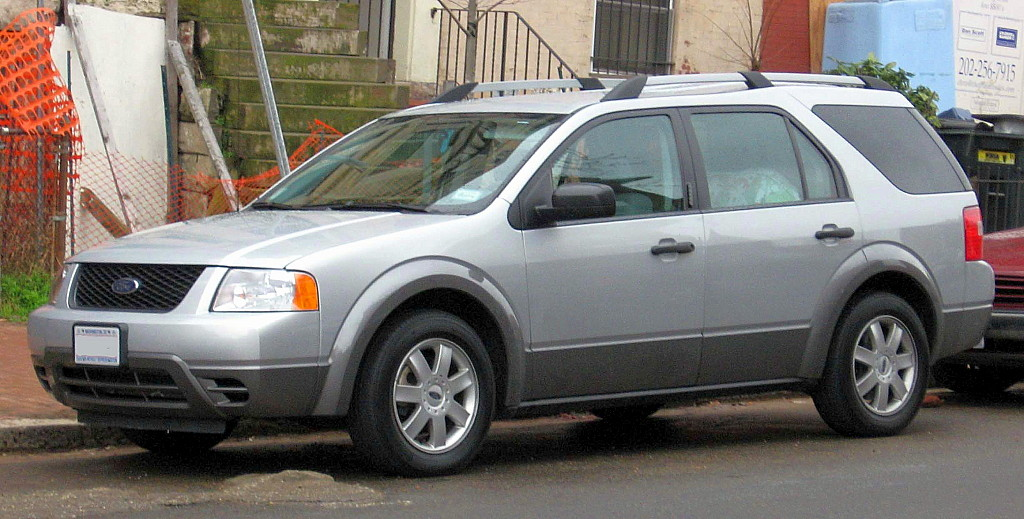
A2005-2007 Ford Freestyle SE

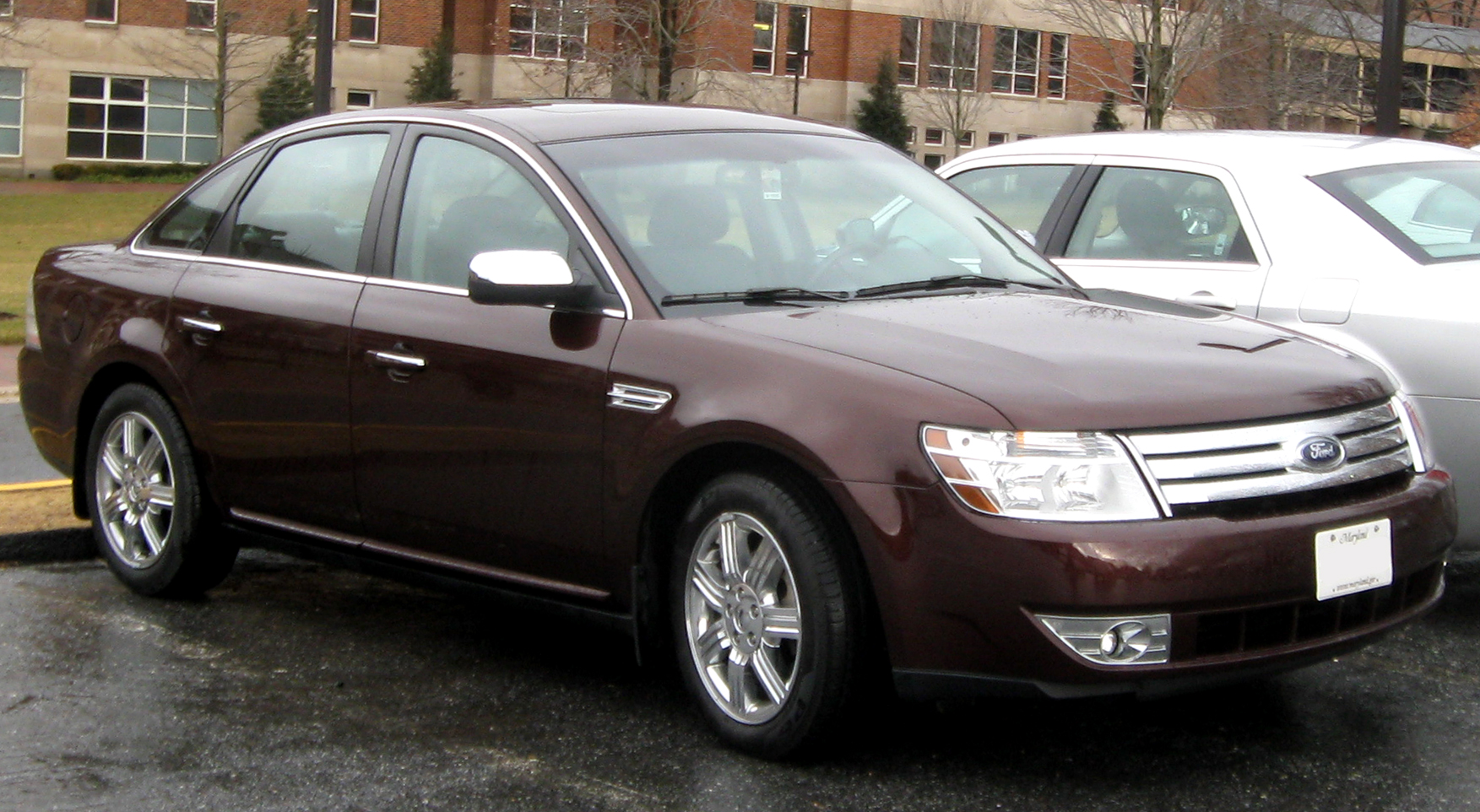
A 2008-2009 Ford Taurus Limited

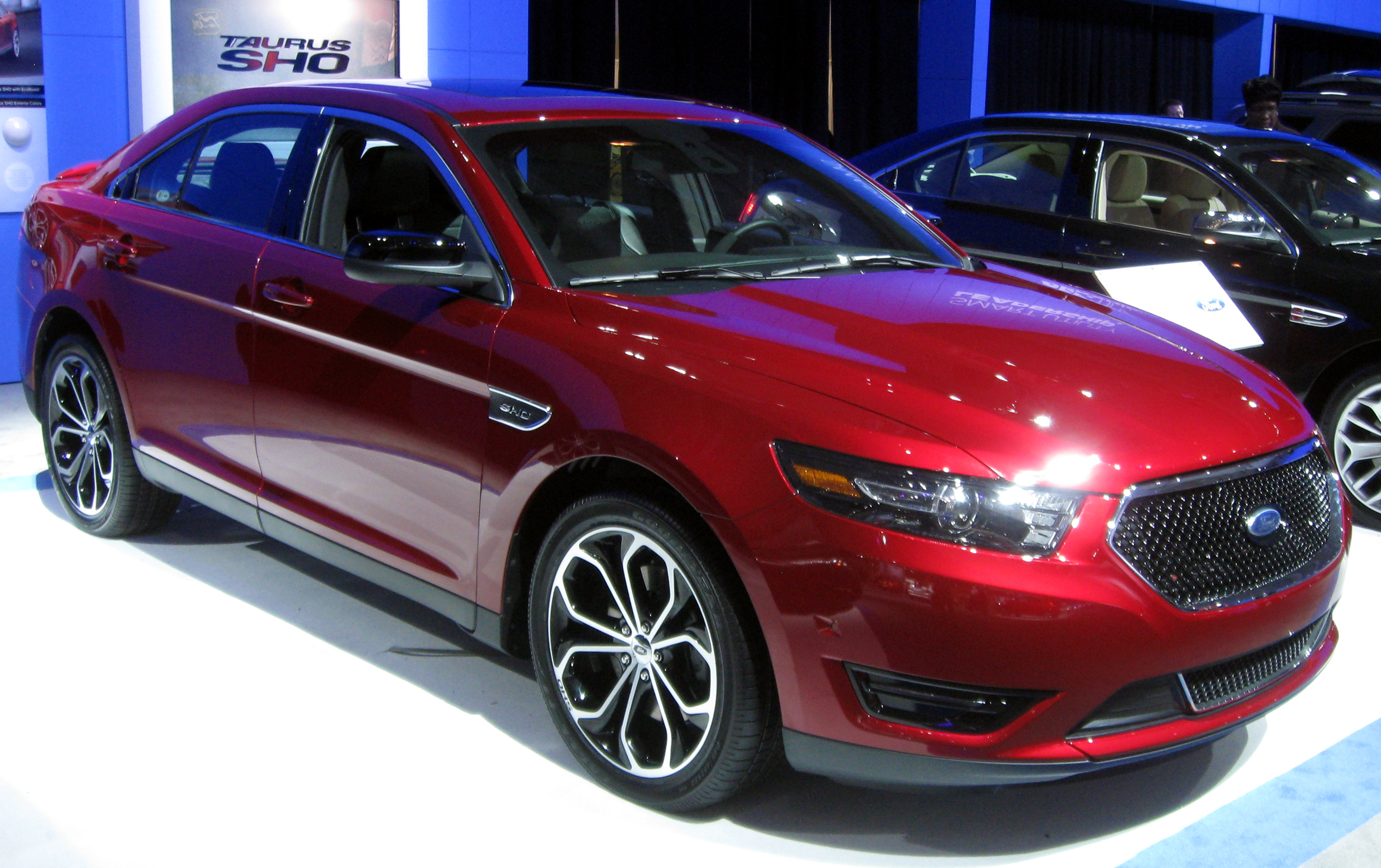
A 2013 Ford Taurus SHO

For the 2005 model year, Ford introduced the Ford Five Hundred, its first all-new full-sized sedan in 26 years. The larger of two cars developed to replace the Taurus (alongside the Ford Fusion), in retail markets, the Five Hundred also began to take over the role of the Crown Victoria in the Ford sedan lineup. Produced solely as a four-door sedan, the Five Hundred (drawing its name from the Galaxie 500) was sold alongside the Ford Freestyle; while marketed as a crossover SUV, the Freestyle functionally served as the closest successor to the Country Squire station wagon; for the first time since 1991, Ford offered full-sized vehicles in multiple body styles.

The model line used the D3 platform, a modification of a Volvo large-car platform. For the first time in the full-sized Ford line, the D3 chassis was of unibody construction and front-wheel drive (in another first, all-wheel drive was an option). For the first time, a V6 was the standard engine (for the first time since 1931, no V8 was offered).

For the 2008 model year, the model line underwent a midcycle redesign and was rebranded as the Ford Taurus (with the Freestyle becoming the Taurus X); Ford management cited greater nameplate recognition behind the decision. In another change, the rebranded Taurus effectively replaced the Crown Victoria, as Ford ended retail sale of the latter model line.

For 2010, Ford introduced a sixth generation of the Taurus; again using the D3 chassis, the Ford Taurus SHO made its return with a twin-turbocharged V6 and all-wheel drive. As part of a 2013 update, Ford introduced a Ford Police Interceptor Sedan police patrol/pursuit car; derived from the SHO, the Interceptor Sedan has a standard 3.7 L V6 (from the Mustang) and a 3.5 L twin-turbo V6 from the SHO. A 2.0 L turbocharged inline-four was introduced as an option as the first four-cylinder Taurus since 1991 (and the first four-cylinder full-sized Ford since 1934).

At the end of the 2010s, Ford shifted vehicle production in North America away from sedans to light trucks, largely withdrawing from the full-sized segment in worldwide markets. The final Ford Taurus was produced in March 2019, 15 years after the launch of the D3 chassis and 34 years after the Taurus nameplate.

=== Nameplates ===
- Ford Five Hundred (2005–2007)
- Ford Freestyle/Taurus X (2005–2009)
- Ford Police Interceptor Sedan (2013–2019)
- Ford Taurus (2008–2019; fifth and sixth generations)
- Ford Taurus SHO (2010–2019)
