= Starline =

Starline may refer to:

== Transport ==
- Starline.kz, a defunct Kazakhstan airline
- "STARLINE", the callsign for the United Arab Emirates airline Red Star, see List of airline codes
- "STARLINE", the callsign of the defunct Swedish airline Swedline Express
- Starline, an interterminal train at the Incheon International Airport
- Starline, a light rail train in Malaysia operated by Prasarana Malaysia
- Starline, a cruiseline analog type of company involving space tourism
- Starline Corporation, a bus company in the Philippines, see List of bus companies of the Philippines

== Entertainment ==
- Starline (song), a 2002 rock song by the Japanese band Supercar off the album Highvision
- Starline Drive-In, a drive-in theatre in Australia
- Starline, a brand of toy miniatures built by Amarillo Design Bureau
- Starline Entertainment, a subsidiary of Cube Entertainment
- Starline, a science fiction interstellar travel analog for airline
- Doctor Starline, a fictional character from Sonic the Hedgehog (IDW Publishing)
- Star Line (album), a 2025 album by Chance the Rapper

== Other uses ==
- spectral line, the lines found in the spectrum of stars
- Starline, an elementary school in the Lake Havasu Unified School District
- Starline, a brand of ammunition, see List of handgun cartridges
- Project Starline, an experimental video communication method by Google
- Star Line (shipping company)
- Suburban Transit Access Route (STAR Line), a prpposed Chicago railway project

== See also ==
- Spaceline (disambiguation)
- Starliner (disambiguation)
- Star (disambiguation)
- Line (disambiguation)
