= Aliens Archive =

- Publisher: Imperium Games
- Publication date: 1996
- ISBN: 978-1578283132

Aliens Archive is a 1996 role-playing game supplement published by Imperium Games for Traveller.

== Contents ==
Aliens Archive is a supplement in which detailed profiles are offered of 12 minor alien species suitable for any era or campaign setting. Each species is explored through a consistent chapter structure: origin story, physiological breakdown (covering aspects like skeleton, senses, and reproduction), psychological traits, societal context, and guidance for character creation and roleplaying. Encounters showcase how each race might interact with Imperial space or behave in their native environments. The depicted species include the gravity-adapted, mutated Bye-Ren to the arboreal Hresh.

== Publication history ==
Shannon Appelcline noted that "Aliens Archive (1996) returned to a fertile ground for Traveller publications - aliens - but rather than highlighting any of the well-loved Traveller races, it instead described 12 minor races. Worse, it did so in a generic manner, saying 'Homeworld locations are purposefully left vague so that you can place the aliens anywhere in the region of the Imperium'. Increasingly the strength of Traveller was its background setting, not its game system (as we will see in the post-Imperium era), and here Imperium was largely ignoring that strength - though they had intended to cover the major races in future releases."

== Reception ==
Andy Butcher reviewed Starships, Aliens Archive, and Central Supply Catalog for Arcane magazine, rating it an 8 out of 10 overall, and stated that "Something of a mixed bag - the first three releases for the new edition of Traveller vary considerably in quality and value. The fact that all the books seem to have been produced fairly cheaply doesn't help either. Nonetheless, the Aliens Archive and Central Supply Catalogue are both useful and promise much for future releases. You may find yourself buying Starships simply for the design rules, but be prepared to be disappointed with the rest of the book."

== Reviews ==
- Shadis (Issue 34 - Mar 1997)
- AAB Proceedings (Issue 36)
- Casus Belli #103
