= Rocketship (disambiguation) =

A rocketship is a rocket-powered vehicle used to transport robotic spacecraft or humans between the Earth's surface and outer space.

Rocketship, Rocket Ship, or rocket ship may refer to:

== Nautical ships ==
- Landing Craft Tank (Rocket), military ships armed with rockets
- RS RocketShip, a cargo ship of the United States

=== Missile ships ===
- Missile cruiser, military ships armed with missiles
- Missile boat, a missile armed combat boat
- Arsenal ship, a floating missile battery

== Spacecraft ==
- Space vehicle, the combination of launch vehicle and spacecraft, sometimes called rocketships
- Spacecraft, a craft, vehicle, vessel or machine designed for spaceflight, sometimes called rocketships

== Music ==
- Rocketship (band), an indie band from Sacramento, California

=== Songs ===
- "Rocketship", a song by the American rock band Mötley Crüe
- "Rocketship", a song by Shane Harper
- "Rocket Ship", a song by Marty Stuart
- "Rocket Ship", a song by Jimmy Gage
- "Rocket Ship", a song by Tommy McCook with Baba Brooks Band, 1965
- "Rocket Ship", a song by the Medallions, 1960
- "Rocket Ship", a song by Future, 2019
- "Rocketship", a song by Guster, 1997

== Other uses ==
- Rocket Ship, the original title of a 1936 feature film derived from the Flash Gordon serial

== See also ==
- Spaceship (disambiguation)
- Starship (disambiguation)
- Rocket (disambiguation)
- Rocket vessel
- Ship (disambiguation)
