= Spaceline =

Spaceline may refer to:

- An organization in the space tourism industry, such as Space Adventures and Virgin Galactic
- Karman line, the line demarcating the start of space, from the ground, at 100km, as defined by the FAI.Spaceline

== See also ==
- Spaceliner (disambiguation)
- Starline (disambiguation)
- Space (disambiguation)
- Line (disambiguation)
