= Central Supply Catalog =

- Author: Greg Porter
- Publication date: 1996
- ISBN: 978-1578283248

Central Supply Catalog is a 1996 role-playing game supplement published by Imperium Games for Traveller.

== Contents ==
Central Supply Catalog is a supplement in which the equipment lists in the basic rules are expanded, introducing a broad array of gear, commerce-related notes, and design systems for vehicles and simple robots. Organized by thematic chapters, the first section focuses on Imperial Surplus gear—military items phased out by newer tech—serving both as legally available equipment and potential trade goods for merchant characters. Subsequent chapters cover Protective Gear, Exploration Tools, Personal Mobility, and Commercial Goods, blending updates from earlier editions with new additions. Each item is detailed, and boxed sections introduce relevant rules, such as environmental hazards and robotic applications. The final, more substantial chapter provides a complete vehicle design system, offering vehicle combat rules and sample designs across varying tech levels.

== Publication history ==
Shannon Appelcline noted that "The Central Supply Catalog (1996) was a fine source of equipment and fans were enthusiastic about the publication of Journal of the Travellers' Aid Society #25 (1996), which was the resurrection of an old Traveller magazine last published by GDW in 1985."

== Reception ==
Andy Butcher reviewed Starships, Aliens Archive, and Central Supply Catalog for Arcane magazine, rating it a 6 out of 10 overall, and stated that "Something of a mixed bag - the first three releases for the new edition of Traveller vary considerably in quality and value. The fact that all the books seem to have been produced fairly cheaply doesn't help either. Nonetheless, the Aliens Archive and Central Supply Catalogue are both useful and promise much for future releases. You may find yourself buying Starships simply for the design rules, but be prepared to be disappointed with the rest of the book."

== Reviews ==
- Shadis (Issue 34 - Mar 1997)
- AAB Proceedings (Issue 36)
- Casus Belli #103
