= Starships (Traveller) =

- Publisher: Imperium Games
- Publication date: 1996; 30 years ago

Starships is a 1996 role-playing game supplement published by Imperium Games for Marc Miller's Traveller.

== Contents ==
Starships is a supplement in which the content is divided into three parts: a brief Imperial Calendar, a substantial Universal Ship Profiles section featuring 30 military and civilian vessels from the Milieu 0 setting, and the Standard Ship Design System (SSD). While the ship profiles offer stats, descriptions, artwork by Chris Foss, and deck plans, the designs mostly reinterpret classic Traveller ships at lower tech levels—some updated, others straying from the originals.

== Publication history ==
Shannon Appelcline noted that after delays on T4 supplements, "Starships (1996), the first Traveller supplement, finally came out in November. A three-month gap before the first supplement was not terrible but Imperium's continued posting of inaccurate schedules (and Whitman's defences on them on the internet) had made things look worse." Appecline also explained that "Unfortunately, this first supplement did not hold up to fans' expectations any more than the rulebook had. The 108-page book included 64 pages of huge deckplans and 12 pages of beautiful but irrelevant Chris Foss artwork. The only actual rules in the book - a ship design system - ran a mere 26 pages, less than a quarter of the book." Appelcline concluded that "The book was also pricey for the mid-1990s at $20.00 for 108 pages."

== Reception ==
Andy Butcher reviewed Starships, Aliens Archive, and Central Supply Catalog for Arcane magazine, rating it a 4 out of 10 overall, and stated that "Something of a mixed bag - the first three releases for the new edition of Traveller vary considerably in quality and value. The fact that all the books seem to have been produced fairly cheaply doesn't help either. Nonetheless, the Aliens Archive and Central Supply Catalogue are both useful and promise much for future releases. You may find yourself buying Starships simply for the design rules, but be prepared to be disappointed with the rest of the book."

== Reviews ==
- Freelance Traveller #2 (Feb., 2010 PDF)
- Shadis (Issue 34 - Mar 1997)
- AAB Proceedings (Issue 36)
- Casus Belli #103

== See also ==
- Marc Miller's Traveller publications
