= Spaceship =

Spaceship may refer to:

== Spaceflight ==
- Space vehicle, the combination of launch vehicle and spacecraft
- Spacecraft, a craft, vehicle, vessel or machine designed for spaceflight
- Starship, a spacecraft built for interstellar flight
- Spaceplane
- Galaxyship

== Computing ==
- Spaceship (cellular automaton), a pattern that reappears after a certain number of generations in the same orientation but in a different position
- Spaceship operator, a comparison primitive in several programming languages

== Music ==
=== Songs ===
- "Spaceship" (Kanye West song), 2004
- "Spaceship" (Puddle of Mudd song), 2009
- "Spaceship" (Tinchy Stryder and Dappy song), 2011
- "Spaceship" (Anhayla song), 2015
- "Spaceship", a song by Benny Benassi from the 2011 album Electroman
- "Spaceship", a song by Daughtry from the 2011 album Break the Spell
- "Spaceship", a song by Kesha from the 2017 album Rainbow
- "Spaceship", a song by The Vines from the 2006 album Vision Valley
- "Spaceship", a 2000 song by Angie Aparo
- "Spaceship", a song by Don christine Toliver and Sheck Wes from the 2020 album Heaven or Hell

== Other uses ==
- The Creature Wasn't Nice, or Spaceship, a 1983 American comedy film
- "Spaceship", the third scene of the fourth act of the 1976 opera Einstein on the Beach by Philip Glass

== See also ==
- Rocketship (disambiguation)
- Starship (disambiguation)
- List of fictional spacecraft
- Ship (disambiguation)
- Space (disambiguation)
