= Starship (disambiguation) =

A starship is a theoretical vehicle for interstellar travel.

Starship may also refer to:

== Film and television ==
- Spacecraft in Star Trek, many of which are known as starships
- Starship (film), a 1985 science fiction film by Roger Christian
- Starship: Rising, a 2014 science fiction film by Neil Johnson
- Starship: Apocalypse, a 2014 sequel science fiction film to Starship: Rising

== Literature ==
- Starship (fanzine), published from 1963–1984 by Andrew Porter
- Starship (novel) or Non-Stop, a 1958 science fiction novel by Brian Aldiss
- "Stellar Ships" or "Star Ships", a 1944 science fiction story by Ivan Yefremov

== Music ==
- Jefferson Starship, an American rock band formed in 1974 from members of Jefferson Airplane
- Starship (band), formed in 1984 from members of Jefferson Starship
- Starship EP, an EP by Zion I
- "Starships" (song), a song by Nicki Minaj
- Starship (musical), a musical by StarKid Productions
  - Starship (album), an album of music from the theatre production
- Starship Entertainment, a South Korean music label

== Vehicles ==
- The Starship, an aircraft used by Led Zeppelin and other bands in the 1970s
- Beechcraft Starship, a small executive aircraft
- M60A2 Starship, an American tank
- SpaceX Starship, a fully reusable large space vehicle being developed by SpaceX, composed of
  - SpaceX Starship (spacecraft), the upper stage of the integrated stack, also called Starship
  - SpaceX Super Heavy "booster", the lower rocket stage that returns to the launch tower
- Geely Galaxy Starship 7, a Chinese plug-in hybrid SUV

== Games ==
- Star Ship, a 1978 video game for the Atari 2600
- Starship 1, a 1976 Atari video game
- Sid Meier's Starships, a video game released in 2015
- Starships (Traveller), a 1996 supplement for the role-playing game Traveller

== Other uses ==
- Starship Children's Health, a hospital in Auckland, New Zealand
- Starship Technologies, a delivery robot company
- Starship (genetics), a type of transposable element found in fungi

== See also ==
- Pole star, the ship star used in navigation
- Shipstar, a novel by Larry Niven and Gregory Benford, see Gregory Benford bibliography
- Shipstar Shipping Services, the operator of transport ship Yugoslav auxiliary Ugor
- Spaceship (disambiguation)
- Rocketship (disambiguation)
- Star (disambiguation)
- Ship (disambiguation)
- Starship Troopers (disambiguation)
