= Ford Starliner =

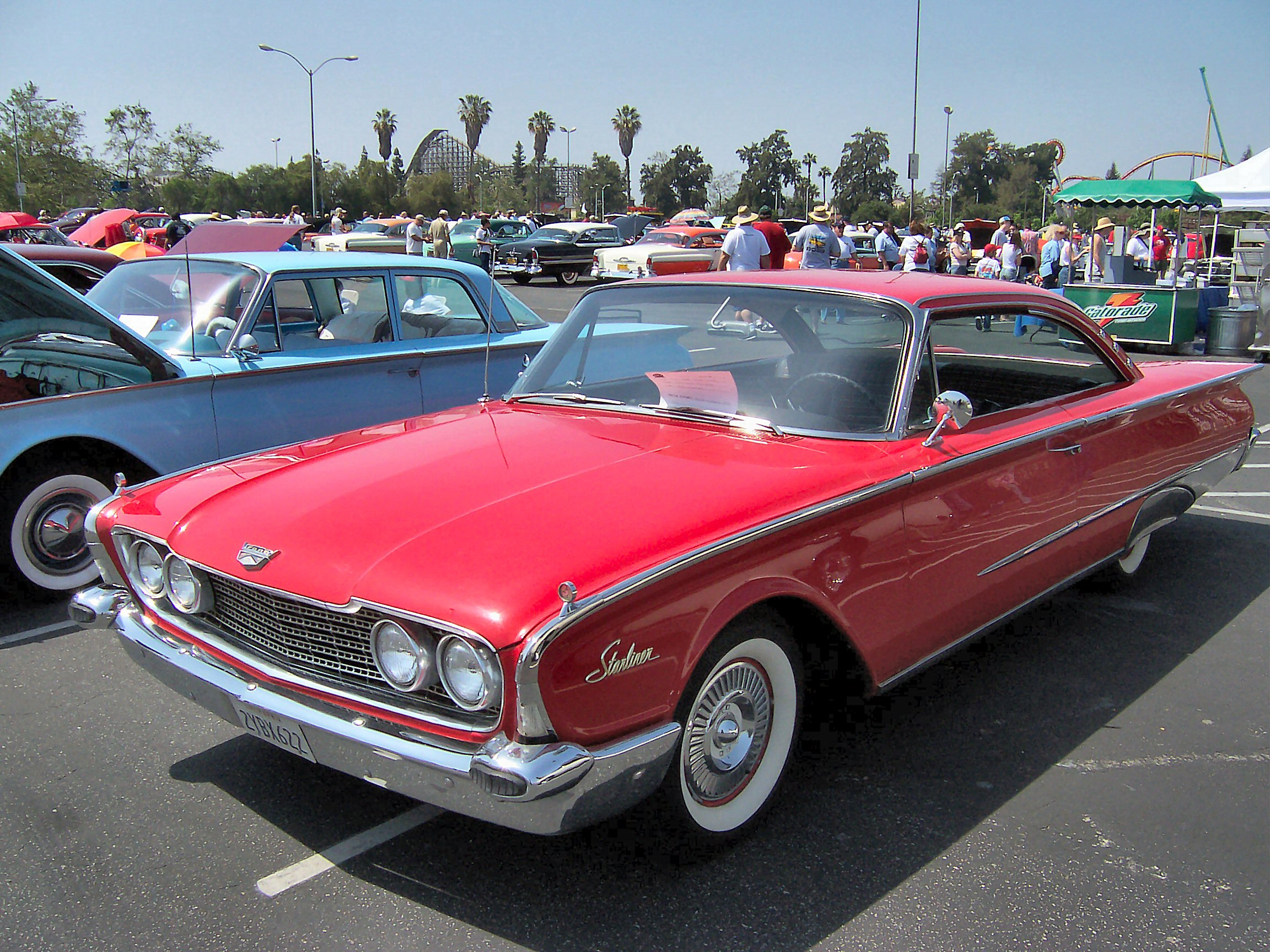
- 1960 Ford Starliner

Overview
- Manufacturer: Ford
- Production: 1960–1961

Body and chassis
- Class: Full-size
- Body style: 2-door hardtop

Chronology
- Successor: Ford Galaxie 500

The Ford Starliner was a full-size, two-door, fastback variant of the flagship Galaxie, manufactured and marketed by Ford Motor Company for model years 1960 and 1961.

In 1960, the Starliner hardtop, along with the Sunliner convertible, comprised the Galaxie Special Series, using the high-level Galaxie trim and Starliner script replacing the trunklid's Galaxie emblem. For model year 1961, the Starliner hardtop and Sunliner convertible were part of the Galaxie Series.

The Ford Starliner shares its name with the 1952–1954 Studebaker Starliner and the Lockheed L-1649A airplane.

Characterized by thin roof pillars, fastback styling and implied aerodynamics, the Starliner symbolized 1960s Jet Age design. The '60 and '61 Starliners shared their roof lines and chassis, with the 1961 Starliner featuring substantially revised front and rear styling.

Ford offered its 292 CID Y-block V-8 as the base engine for model years 1960 and 1961, with the 352 motor (originally introduced in 1958) as an option for both years, and its 352 high-performance engine optional for 1961 (available only with a manual transmission). The latter optional engine offered 360 HP; Ford's first engine to have a more than 1HP rating per cubic inch. In 1961, Ford offered the new Thunderbird 390 cubic-inch motor in three versions with the top line offering in 375 horsepower. Ford also offered a 6V-401 HP dealership option, whereby a three-2 barrel manifold and carb setup were shipped in the trunk, to be installed by the dealer or the buyer.

In 1962 the Galaxie 500 (and 500 XL) replaced the Starliner as the top offering. Ford built 68,641 Starliners in 1960 and 29,669 in 1961.

== Motorsport ==
The Starliner offered a suitable platform for NASCAR teams to build their race cars. They were produced in limited numbers and due to their racing applications few survivors exist today. For 1962, Ford initially proposed a "Starlift" removable slant back, but the car was dropped after one race. Finally in 1963, Ford introduced a fastback version of the Galaxie called the "1963 1/2 Sports Hardtop," which featured a NASCAR-inspired 1-inch lowered roofline.
