= John Kendrick Bangs =

American author, editor and satirist

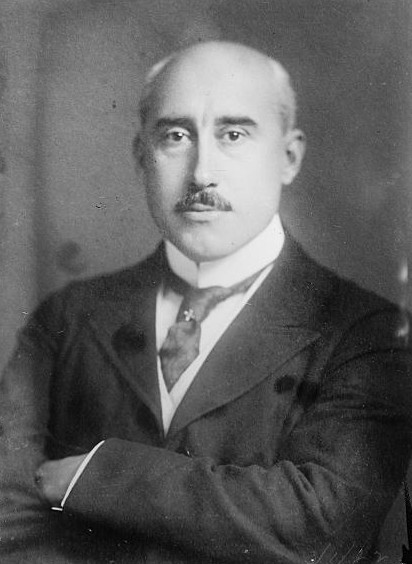
- Bangs in 1922
- Born: May 27, 1862; Yonkers, New York, U.S.
- Died: January 21, 1922 (aged 59); Atlantic City, New Jersey, U.S.
- Education: Columbia College (BA); Columbia Law School
- Occupations: Author; humorist; editor; satirist
- Writing career
- Genre: Bangsian fantasy

Signature
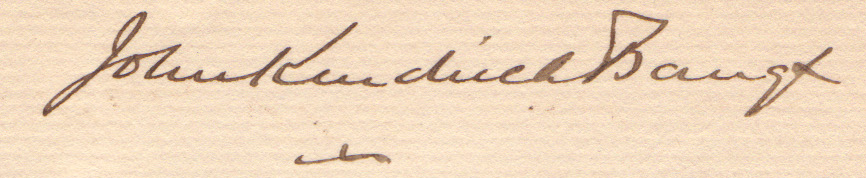

John Kendrick Bangs (May 27, 1862 – January 21, 1922) was an American writer, humorist, editor and satirist.

== Biography ==
He was born in Yonkers, New York. His father Francis N. Bangs was a lawyer in New York City, as was his brother, Francis S. Bangs.

He went to Columbia College from 1880 to 1883 where he became editor of Columbia's literary magazine, Acta Columbia, and contributed short anonymous pieces to humor magazines. After graduation in 1883 with a Bachelor of Philosophy degree in Political Science, Bangs entered Columbia Law School but left in 1884 to become Associate Editor of Life under Edward S. Martin. Bangs contributed many articles and poems to the magazine between 1884 and 1888. During this period, Bangs published his first books.

In 1888 Bangs left Life to work at Harper's Magazine, Harper's Bazaar and Harper's Young People, though he continued to contribute to Life. From 1889 to 1900 he held the title of Editor of the Departments of Humor for all three Harper's magazines and from 1899 to 1901 served as active editor of Harper's Weekly. Bangs also served for a short time (January–June 1889) as the first editor of Munsey's Magazine and became editor of the American edition of the Harper-owned Literature from January to November 1899.

In 1894, Bangs ran for the office of mayor of Yonkers, New York, but was defeated. He also was a member of the Board of Education in Yonkers.

He left Harper & Brothers in 1901 and became editor of the New Metropolitan magazine in 1903. In 1904 he was appointed editor of Puck, perhaps the foremost American humor magazine of its day. In this period, he revived his earlier interest in drama. In 1906 he switched his focus to the lecture circuit.

During the period between 1901 and 1906 Bangs was known to have spent at least parts of his summers at the Profile House in Franconia, New Hampshire. He owned one of the 20 connected cottages adjacent to the large hotel, which he sold to Cornelius Newton Bliss in August 1906. As a satirical writer, he was also known in the "Profile Cottage" circles as a jokester and prankster and was frequently the jovial topic of hotel guests and cottage owners alike.

In 1918, he lectured for YMCA and allied troops on the battle front in France during World War I.

In 1886, he married Agnes L. Hyde, with whom he had three sons. Agnes died in 1903. Bangs then married Mary Blakeney Gray of New York in 1904. In 1907 they moved from Yonkers to Ogunquit, Maine. John Kendrick Bangs died from stomach cancer in 1922 at age fifty-nine, in Atlantic City, New Jersey.

== Works ==
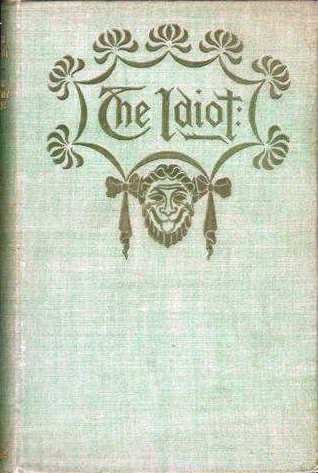
Front cover of The Idiot (1895)

Books published in three story series are listed separately (Series, below): Associated Shades, The Idiot, and Raffles (the latter created by E. W. Hornung).

- The Lorgnette (1886) with S. W. Van Schalck, New York: George J. Coombes
- Roger Camerden: A Strange Story (1887); New York: George J. Coombes
- Katharine: A Travesty (1887); New York: Gilliss Brothers and Turner, Art Age Press
- New Waggings of Old Tales by Two Wags (1888) with Frank Dempster Sherman and Oliver Herford; Boston: Ticknor
- Mephistopheles: A Profanation (1889); New York: Gilliss Brothers & Turner, Art Age Press
- Tiddledywink Tales (1891), illus. Charles Howard Johnson; New York: R. H. Russell & Son
- The Tiddledywink's Poetry Book (1892), illus. Charles Howard Johnson; Dewitt Publishing House
- In Camp with a Tin Solder (1892), illus. E. M. Ashe; New York: R. H. Russell & Son
- Half Hours with Jimmieboy (1893), illus. Frank Verbeck, Charles Howard Johnson, J. T. Richards (F.T.?), P. Newell, and others; New York: R. H. Russell & Son
- Toppleton's Client: or A Spirit in Exile (1893); London: Osgood, McIlvaine; New York: Harper & Brothers
- Three Weeks in Politics (1894); New York and London: Harper & Brothers
- The Water Ghost, and Others (1894); New York and London: Harper & Brothers
- "Thurlow's Christmas Story" (1894) – included in Ghosts I Have Met and Some Others (1898) and in American Fantastic Tales, ed. Peter Straub (The Library of America, 2009)
- A Summers Sojourn (1895)
- Mr. Bonaparte of Corsica (1895), illus. H. W. McVickar (Henry W.); New York and London: Harper & Brothers
- The Paradise Club (1895)
- A Rebellious Heroine (1896), illus. W. T. Smedley (William T.); New York and London: Harper & Brothers
- The Bicyclers, and Three Other Farces (1896); New York and London: Harper & Brothers
- The Mantel-Piece Minstrels, and Other Stories (1897); New York and London: Harper & Brothers
- A Prophecy and a Plea (1897)
- Paste Jewels: Being Seven Tales of Domestic Woe (1897); New York and London: Harper & Brothers
- Ghosts I Have Met and Some Others (1898), illus. Peter Newell, A. B. Frost, and F. T. Richards; New York and London: Harper & Brothers
- Peeps at Peoples: Passages from the Writings of Anne Warrington Witherup, Journalist (1899), illus. Edward Penfield; New York and London: Harper & Brothers
- The Dreamers: A Club: Being a More or Less Faithful Account of the Literary Exercises of the First Regular Meeting of That Organization (1899), illus. Edward Penfield; New York and London: Harper & Brothers
- Cobwebs from a Literary Corner (1899); New York and London: Harper & Brothers
- In Camp with a Tin Soldier (1900), illus. E. M. Ashe, New York: R. H. Russell
- The Booming of Acre Hill and Other Reminiscences of Urban and Suburban Life (1900); New York and London: Harper & Brothers
- Over the Plum-Pudding (1901); New York and London: Harper & Brothers
- Bikey the Skicycle and Other Tales of Jimmieboy (1902); New York: Riggs Publishing Company
- Emblemland, by Bangs and editorial cartoonist Charles Raymond Macauley (1902); New York: R. H. Russell; also issued as Rollo in Emblemland
- Mollie and the Unwiseman (1902), illus. Albert Levering and Clare Victor Dwiggins; Philadelphia: Henry T. Coates & Co.
- Olympian Nights (1902); New York and London: Harper & Brothers
- Uncle Sam, Trustee (1902); New York: Riggs Publishing Company
- Over the Plum Pudding (1902)
- Under Difficulties (1905)
- The Worsted Man, A Musical Play for Amateurs (1905); New York: Harper & Brothers
- The Andiron Tales (1906); Philadelphia: The John C. Winston Co.
- Alice in Blunderland: An Iridescent Dream (1907), illus. Albert Levering; New York: Doubleday, Page & Company
- The Whole Family: A Novel by Twelve Authors (1908) – one chapter by Bangs
- Potted Fiction: Being a Series of Extracts from the World's Best Sellers, Put Up in Thin Slices for Hurried Consumers (1908), edited by Bangs; New York: Doubleday, Page & Co.
- The Real Thing and Three Other Farces (1909); New York and London: Harper & Brothers
- The Autobiography of Methuselah (1909), illus. F. G. Cooper; New York: B. W. Dodge & Company
- Mollie and the Unwiseman Abroad. J. Lippincott Company. 1910.
- Songs of Cheer (1910); Boston: Sherman French & Company
- Jack and the Checkbook (1911), illus. Albert Levering; New York and London: Harper & Brothers
- Echoes of Cheer (1912); Boston: Sherman French & Company
- A Little Book of Christmas (1912), illus. Arthur E. Becher; Boston: Little, Brown, and Company
- A Line o' Cheer for Each Day o' the Year (1913); Boston: Little, Brown, and Company
- A Chafing Dish Party (1913); New York and London: Harper & Brothers
- The Foothills of Parnassus (1915); New York: Macmillan
- A Quest for Song (1915)
- From Pillar to Post, Leaves from a Lecturer's Note-book (1916), illus. Jno. R. Neill, New York: The Century Co.
- The Cheery Way (1919); New York and London: Harper & Brothers

=== Series ===
The Idiot

There were 1899 editions of both Coffee and Repartee, copyright 1893, and Coffee and Repartee and the Idiot, copyright 1893, 1895, 1899 (both available online at HathiTrust Digital Library, HDL). Perhaps one or both works were revised.

- Coffee and Repartee (1893), illustrated; New York and London: Harper & Brothers
- The Idiot (1895), illus. F. T. Richards; New York and London: Harper & Brothers
- The Idiot at Home (1900), illus. Richards; New York and London: Harper & Brothers
- The Inventions of the Idiot (1904); New York and London: Harper & Brothers
- The Genial Idiot: His Views and Reviews (1908); New York and London: Harper & Brothers
- Half-Hours with the Idiot (1917); Boston: Little, Brown, and Company

Illustrations in Coffee and Repartee, unsigned, and The Idiot, clearly signed "F. T. Richards", were not credited (both available online at HDL). The Library of Congress reports "F.T. Richards" credited on the title page of The Idiot at Home, 1900 (first edition).

Associated Shades

Originally the Associated Shades is an exclusive men's club in Hades, whose members are the shades of famous people, including Adam and Baron Munchausen but primarily historical writers: Homer, Confucius, Shakespeare, president Walter Raleigh, Johnson and Boswell, and many others. All four books were illustrated by Peter Newell.

- A House-Boat on the Styx, Being Some Account of the Divers Doings of the Associated Shades (1895); New York: Harper & Brothers
- The Pursuit of the House-Boat, Being Some Further Account of the Divers Doings of the Associated Shades, Under the Leadership of Sherlock Holmes, Esq. (1897); New York: Harper & Brothers
- The Enchanted Type-Writer (1899) – collection; New York and London: Harper & Brothers
- Mr. Munchausen: Being a True Account of Some of the Recent Adventures Beyond the Styx of the Late Hieronymus Carl Friedrich, Sometimes Baron Munchausen of Bodenwerder, as Originally Reported for the Sunday Edition of the Gehenna Gazette by Its Special Interviewer the Late Mr. Ananias Formerly of Jerusalem and Now First Transcribed from the Columns of that Journal (1901) – featuring Baron Munchausen, one of the Associated Shades; Boston: Noyes, Platt

Raffles series

These two short story collections are sequels to the Raffles books by E. W. Hornung.

- Mrs. Raffles: Being the Adventures of an Amateur Cracks Woman, Narrated by Bunny (1905), edited by Bangs, illus. Albert Levering; New York and London: Harper & Brothers
- R. Holmes & Co.: Being the Remarkable Adventures of Raffles Holmes, Esq., Detective and Amateur Cracksman by Birth (1906), illus. Sydney Adamson; New York and London: Harper & Brothers

== Other sources ==
- Bleiler, Everett (1948). The Checklist of Fantastic Literature. Chicago: Shasta Publishers. pp. 39–40.* "John Kendrick Bangs". The Literature Network.
- Gale, Steven H. (1988). Encyclopedia of American Humorists. Garland Publishing, Inc. pp. 24–27. ISBN 9781317362272.
- Johnson, Rossiter, ed. (1906). "Bangs, John Kendrick". The Biographical Dictionary of America. Vol. 1. Boston: American Biographical Society. p. 205.
- Smith, Geoffrey D. (1997). American Fiction, 1901-1925: A Bibliography. Cambridge, England: Cambridge University Press. pp. 34–35. ISBN 9780521434690.
