= Mr. Munchausen =

1901 novel by John Kendrick Bangs

- Front cover of first edition
- Author: John Kendrick Bangs
- Illustrator: Peter Newell
- Series: Associated Shades
- Genre: Fantasy short stories
- Publisher: Noyes, Platt & Co.
- Publication date: 1901
- Publication place: United States
- Media type: Print (hardcover)
- Pages: 180
- OCLC: 644706
- LC Class: PZ3.B224 Mrm PS1064.B3
- Preceded by: The Enchanted Type-Writer

Mr. Munchausen is a novel by John Kendrick Bangs, written in the style that has become known as Bangsian fantasy. It is the fourth book of Bangs' Associated Shades series.

== Title ==
The book's full title is:

Mr. Munchausen: Being a True Account of Some of the Recent Adventures Beyond the Styx of the Late Hieronymus Carl Friedrich, Sometime Baron Munchausen of Bodenwerder, as originally reported for the Sunday Edition of the Gehenna Gazette by its special interviewer the late Mr. Ananias formerly of Jerusalem, and now first transcribed from the columns of that journal by J. K. Bangs

This is a satire of the long book and chapter titles often prevalent in the 18th and 19th centuries, and a reference to the adventures of the original Baron Munchausen. In various library, collectibles, and sales catalogs the long title of the book is usually truncated in various ways.

== Publication history ==
Originally printed by Noyes, Platt & Co., Boston, US, in 1901, it was reprinted by Books for Libraries Press (1969), ISBN 0-8369-3013-4.
