= The Enchanted Type-Writer =

1899 short story collection

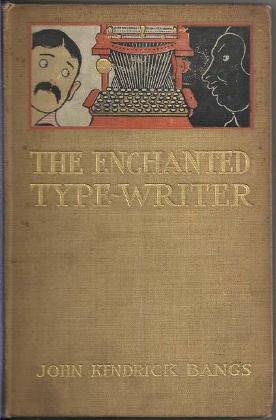
- Front cover of the first edition
- Author: John Kendrick Bangs
- Illustrator: Peter Newell
- Series: Associated Shades
- Genre: Fantasy
- Publisher: Harper & Brothers
- Publication date: 1899
- Publication place: United States
- Media type: Print (hardcover)
- Pages: 170 pp
- OCLC: 908974
- LC Class: PZ3.B224 E PS1064.B3
- Preceded by: Pursuit of the House-Boat
- Followed by: Mr. Munchausen

The Enchanted Type-Writer is a collection of short stories by John Kendrick Bangs, published in 1899 with illustrations by Peter Newell. Bangs attributes many of the stories to the late (and invisible) James Boswell, who has become an editor for a newspaper in Hades, and who communicates with the author by means of an old typewriter. The stories are part of the author's Associated Shades series, sometimes called the Hades series for its primary setting. Their genre has become known as Bangsian fantasy.

There are ten stories in the collection, and ten plates from illustrations by Newell. They were first published serially in Harper's Weekly beginning August 5, 1899, including the Newell illustrations.

== Sources ==
- Bleiler, Everett (1948). The Checklist of Fantastic Literature. Chicago: Shasta Publishers. p. 39.
