= Théophile Gautier, fils =

French scholar, translator and civil servant

Théophile Charles Marie Gautier (29 November 1836 – 16 June 1904) was a French scholar, translator and administrator. He was the son of the writer Théophile Gautier and his mistress Eugénie Fort.

He became sous-préfet of Ambert (Puy-de-Dôme) in 1867 and of Pontoise in 1870, chef du bureau de la Presse at the ministry of the interior in 1868, then secrétaire particulier to the former minister of Napoléon III, Eugène Rouher.

He translated German authors and collaborated on his father's works in the Moniteur and the Journal officiel.

== Publications ==
- L'Administration provinciale de la Prusse (1870)
- Entre Biarritz et St-Sébastien, toros et espadas, notes de touriste (1884)
- La Baronne Véra. Virginie Peugheol. La Maison de poste (1885)

=== Translations ===
- Achim von Arnim, Contes bizarres (1856)
- Rudolf Erich Raspe : Aventures du baron de Münchhausen (1857)
- Karl von Schönhals, Campagnes d'Italie de 1848 et 1849 (1859)
- Johann Wolfgang von Goethe : Wilhelm Meister (2 volumes, 1861)
- Johann Wolfgang von Goethe : Goetz de Berlichingen (1872)
