= Olympian Nights =

Novel published in 1902 by John Kendrick Bangs

Olympian Nights is a novel by John Kendrick Bangs published in 1902.

== Plot summary ==
Olympian Nights is a novel in which an American tourist is invited to visit Olympus.

== Reception ==
Dave Langford reviewed Olympian Nights for White Dwarf #82, and stated that "Dated fun, mostly, but there are good lines here and there."

== Reviews ==
- Review by Chris Morgan (1986) in Fantasy Review, October 1986
- Review by Jon Wallace (1954 -) (1986) in Vector 135
- Review by Don D'Ammassa (1986) in Science Fiction Chronicle, #87 December 1986
