= A House-Boat on the Styx =

1895 novel by John Kendrick Bangs

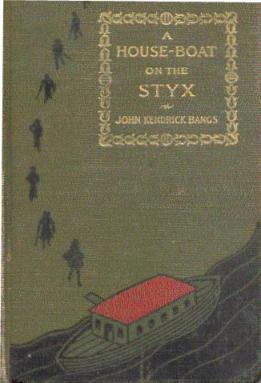
- Front cover of the first edition
- Author: John Kendrick Bangs
- Illustrator: Peter Newell
- Series: Associated Shades
- Genre: Fantasy short stories
- Publisher: Harper & Brothers
- Publication date: 1895
- Publication place: United States
- Media type: Print (hardcover)
- Pages: 171 pp
- OCLC: 859421539
- LC Class: PS1064.B3 H6 1896
- Followed by: The Pursuit of the House-Boat

A House-Boat on the Styx is a fantasy novel written by John Kendrick Bangs in 1895. The original full title was A House-Boat on the Styx: Being Some Account of the Divers Doings of the Associated Shades. The novel was first published by Harper Brothers in 1896 with illustrations by Peter Newell (24 plates).

== Plot summary ==
The premise of the book is that everyone who has ever died (up to the time in which the book is set, which seems to be about the time of its publication) has gone to Styx, the river that circles the underworld.

The book begins with Charon, ferryman of the Styx being startled—and annoyed—by the arrival of a houseboat on the Styx. At first afraid that the boat will put him out of business, he later finds out that he is actually to be appointed the boat's janitor.

What follows are eleven more stories (for a total of twelve) which are set on the house boat. There is no central theme, and the purpose of the book appears to be as a literary thought experiment to see what would happen if various famous dead people were put in the same room with each other. Each chapter is a short story featuring various souls from history and mythology. In the twelfth chapter the house boat disappears, leading into the sequel, The Pursuit of the House-Boat.

== Notes ==
A House-Boat on the Styx has no original fictional characters in it. All are borrowed—with varying degrees of licence—from either history or mythology.

Throughout the book, there is a running joke that Shakespeare did not actually write any of his own plays, that they were actually ghostwritten by Sir Francis Bacon, Sir Walter Raleigh, and other contemporaries. Will always tries to change the subject quickly when authorship comes into conversation.

The book was on the Publishers Weekly list of 10 best-selling novels in the US, 1896.
