= The Pursuit of the House-Boat =

1897 novel by John Kendrick Bangs

- Front cover of the first edition
- Author: John Kendrick Bangs
- Illustrator: Peter Newell
- Series: Associated Shades
- Genre: Fantasy novel
- Publisher: Harper & Brothers
- Publication date: 1897
- Publication place: United States
- Media type: Print (hardcover)
- Pages: 204 pp
- OCLC: 225196
- LC Class: PZ3.B224 Pu PS1064.B3
- Preceded by: A House-Boat on the Styx
- Followed by: The Enchanted Type-Writer

The Pursuit of the House-Boat is an 1897 novel by John Kendrick Bangs, and the second one to feature his Associated Shades take on the afterlife.

The original full title was The Pursuit of the House-Boat: Being Some Further Account of the Divers Doings of the Associated Shades, Under the Leadership of Sherlock Holmes, Esq. and it has also been titled In Pursuit of the House-Boat and Pursuit of the House-Boat.

There are 12 chapters in the book. They were first published as a serial, under the full-title and with the illustrations by Peter Newell, in Harper's Weekly from February 6 to April 24, 1897.

== Plot summary ==
After the Houseboat was hijacked by Captain Kidd at the end of A House-Boat on the Styx, the various members of its club decided that in order to track it down, a detective would have to be called in. So, they hired Sherlock Holmes, who, at the time of the book's publication, had indeed been declared dead by his creator.
