= Peter Newell =

American artist (1862–1924)

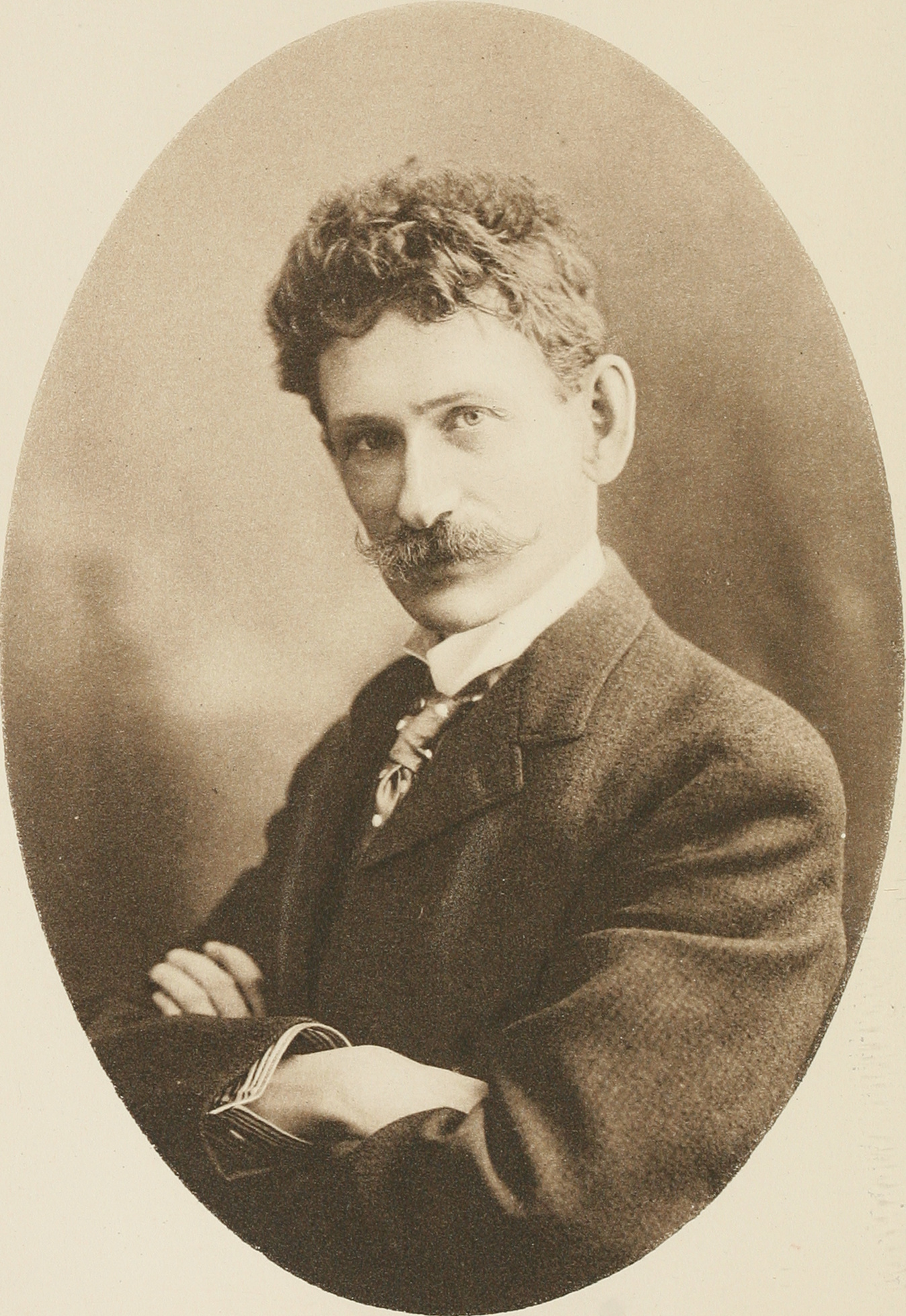
- Peter Newell (before 1902)
- Born: Peter Sheaf Hersey Newell; 5 March 1862; Niagara Falls, New York, U.S.
- Died: 15 January 1924 (aged 61)
- Occupation: Artist

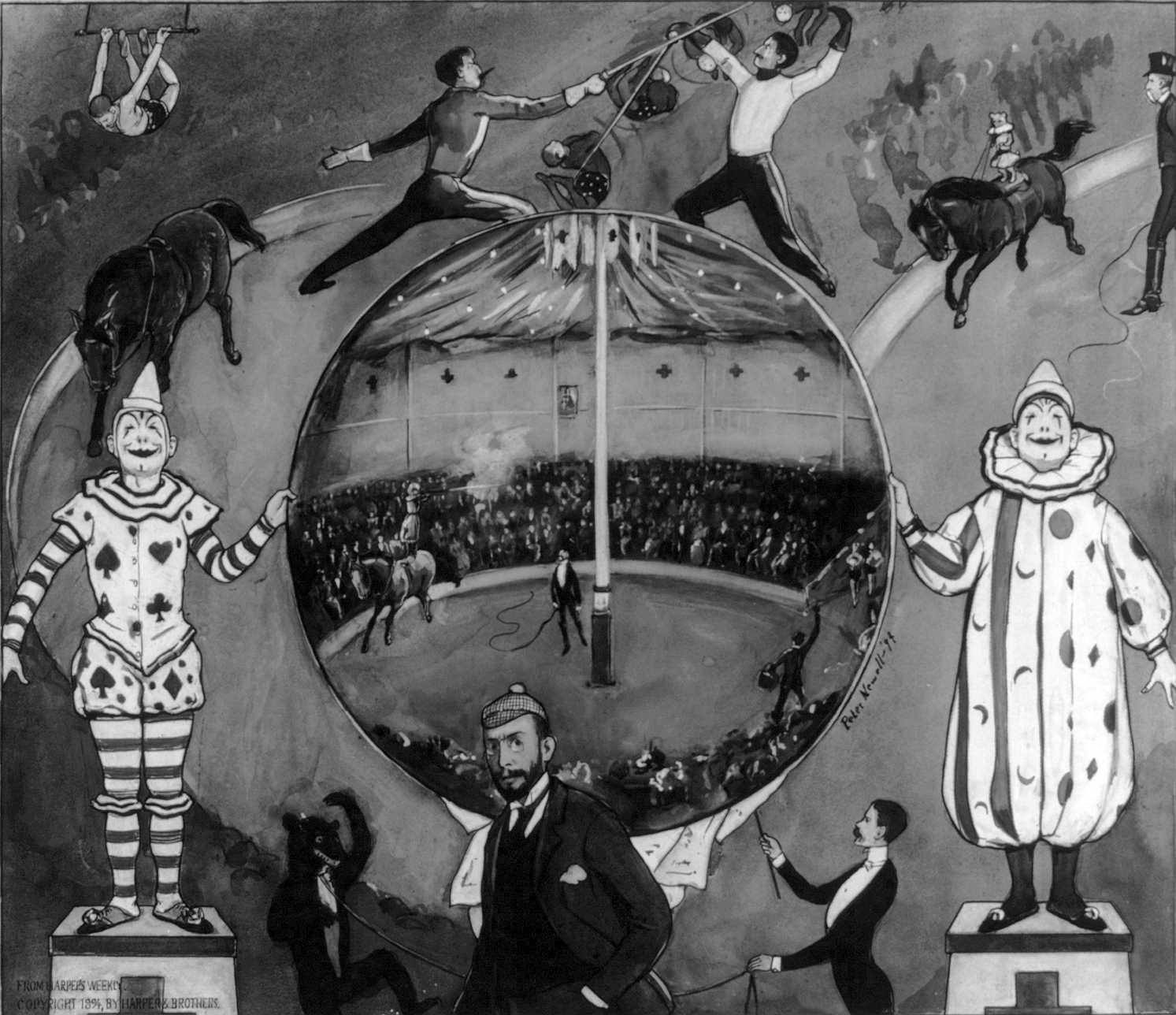
"The Amateur Circus at Nutley" by Peter Newell, which appeared in Harper's Weekly March 31, 1894

Peter Sheaf Hersey Newell (March 5, 1862 – January 15, 1924) was an American illustrator and cartoonist whose work appears in many periodicals and books. He is the author of novelty picture books including The Hole Book (1908) and The Slant Book (1910), and was a pioneer in manipulating the book's physical form as part of the story.

== Early life ==
Newell, a native of McDonough County, Illinois, was born on March 5, 1862. He was reported to have said "Oh, I broke out about the same time as the Civil War". He graduated from high school in 1880 and immediately began work in a cigar factory.

Newell then worked in a gallery in Jacksonville, Illinois. At night, he made humorous illustrations, which he mailed to some of the early illustrated periodicals, including the New York Graphic. Along with his submissions to Harper's Bazaar, he included a request that an editor indicate if he had any talent. The response said "No talent indicated" but had a check enclosed. Newell was encouraged by his success in editorial illustrations, and moved to New York in 1893 to train at the Art Students' League of New York.

== Career ==
Newell only completed one term at the Art Students League, believing that formal instruction would harm his unique creativity. He continued to build a reputation for his humorous drawings and poems, which appeared in Harper's Weekly, Harper's Bazaar, Scribner's Magazine, The Saturday Evening Post, Judge, and other publications. When he was known among national editors, he returned to Illinois. He married Leona Dow Ashcroft in 1884 and returned to the New York region after moving around for several years, settling in the town of Leonia, New Jersey, reportedly named for Newell's wife.

Newell created a comic strip serial, The Naps of Polly Sleepyhead, which debuted in the New York Herald in 1905. Harper's Weekly hired him to cover the Paris Exposition in 1900. In 1912 he covered both the Republican and Democratic national conventions.

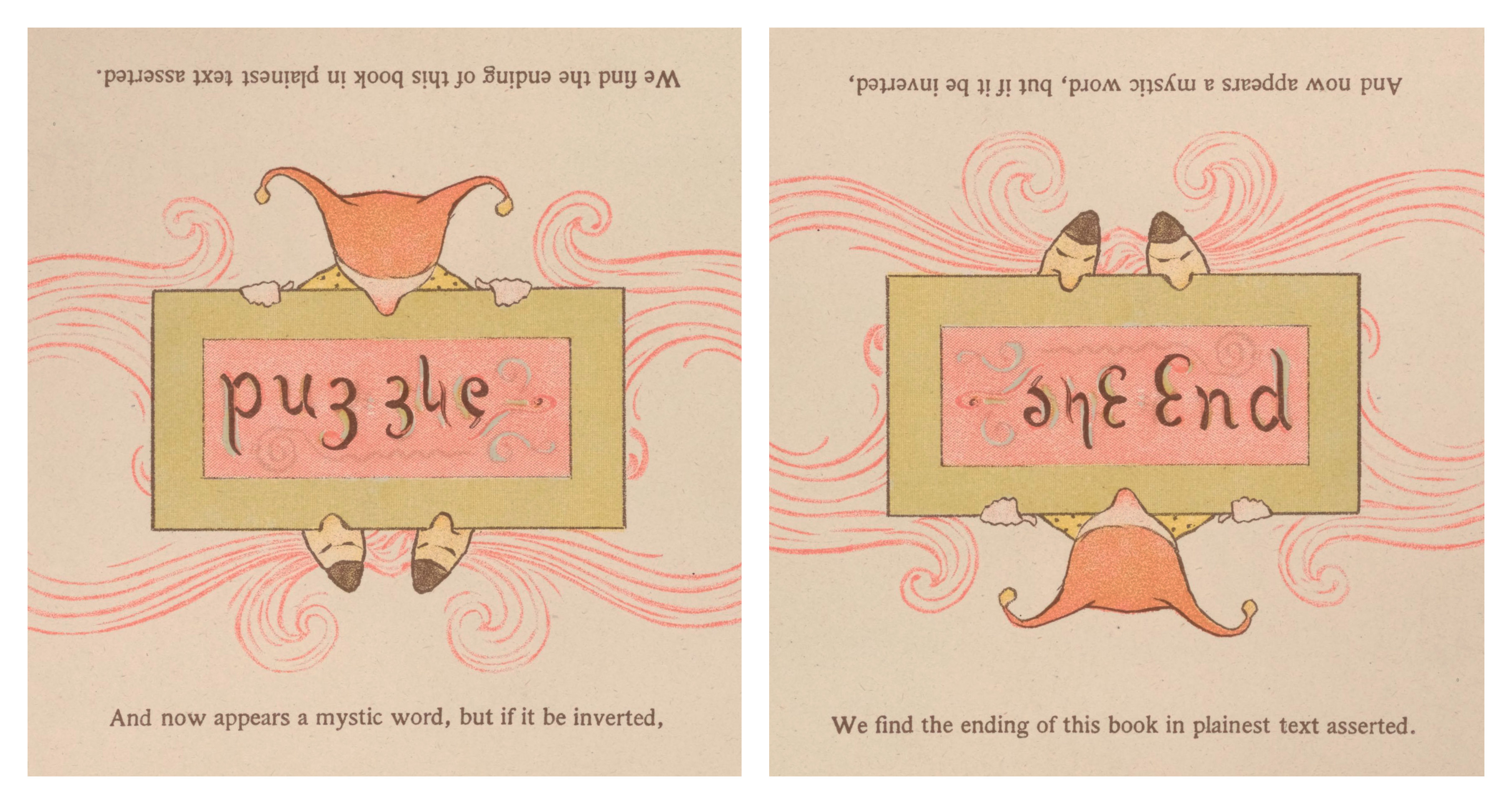
An 1893 ambigram by Newell says both puzzle and, when flipped upside down, the end.

=== Books ===
Newell wrote and illustrated several popular children's books, many of which have been noted for the physical nature of their storytelling. In 1893 he published Topsys and Turvys, a collection of poems and images which could be viewed upside-down or right-side-up. The Hole Book (1908) featured a literal hole at the center of each page to indicate the trajectory of a bullet. The Slant Book (1910), was printed with a rhomboid shape to better represent the hill down which a runaway baby carriage careens in the story. Newell was granted two patents in 1909 and 1910, based on the tactic "the shape of the book itself [...] to characterize the illustration contained therein" that he used for The Slant Book (U.S. patent #970,943) as well as the tactic used in The Hole Book (U.S. patent #1028130A). Original artwork for The Slant Book is held in the Kerlan Collection of the University of Minnesota.

Newell wrote The Rocket Book (1912), which depicts scenes along the trajectory of a rocket, with a hole in the middle of each page to physically represent its path. A 2025 blog post from the Library of Congress praised it as "a story beyond illustrations, one that travels into the book’s construction".

Newell illustrated many works of other authors, including Mark Twain (Innocents Abroad), Stephen Crane (The Monster and Other Stories), and Lewis Carroll (Alice’s Adventures in Wonderland and Through the Looking Glass & What Alice Found There). He collaborated with the artist Gustave Verbeek, whose work has been described as an influence on Newell.

== Personal life ==
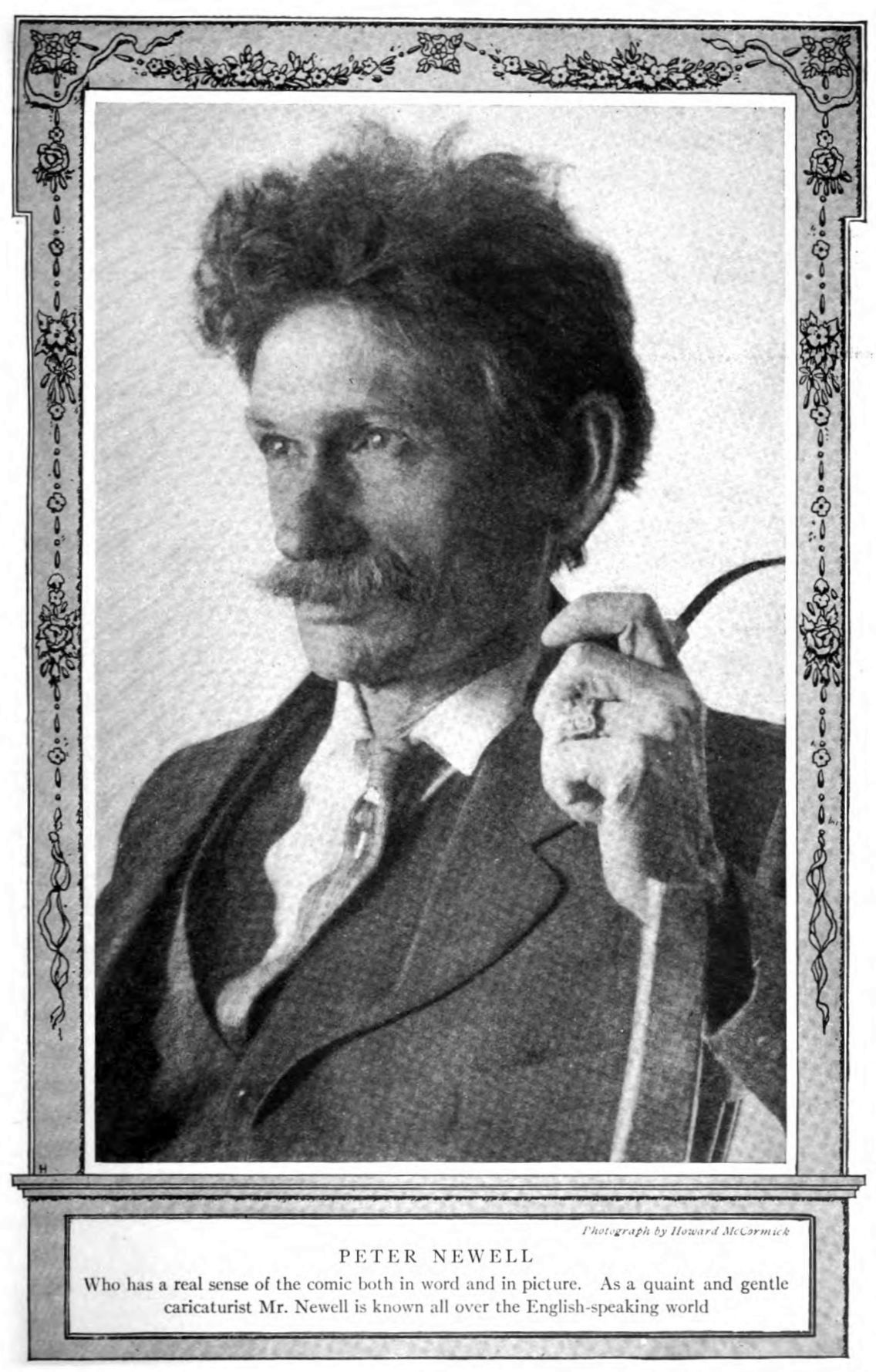
Portrait of Newell that appeared in The American Magazine in 1911

Newell married Leona Dow Ashcraft in 1885. They had three children: two daughters and a son who was killed in World War I. He reportedly said, "Some of my best work has been done while I had a baby on my lap." Newell was well known in the town of Leonia, where he was called "Uncle Peter". He served on the school board and church leadership, and was an amateur magician. Among Newell's hobbies were singing in the church choir and playing tennis and chess, at one point coaching a chess group called the "Chessnuts". Newell died in Little Neck, New York in 1924.

Newell's great-granddaughter, Laura Lydecker, was also an artist and children's book illustrator. Lydecker illustrated editions of Wind in the Willows and The Country Mouse and the City Mouse.

== Bibliography ==
=== As author and illustrator ===
- Topsys and Turvys (1893)
- Wild Flowers (1893), a book of nonsense verse
- A Shadow Show (1896), published by The Century Company
- Peter Newell's Pictures & Rhymes (1899)
- The Hole Book (1908)
- The Slant Book (1910)
- The Rocket Book (1912), all published by Harp

== Gallery ==
Illustrations by Peter Newell

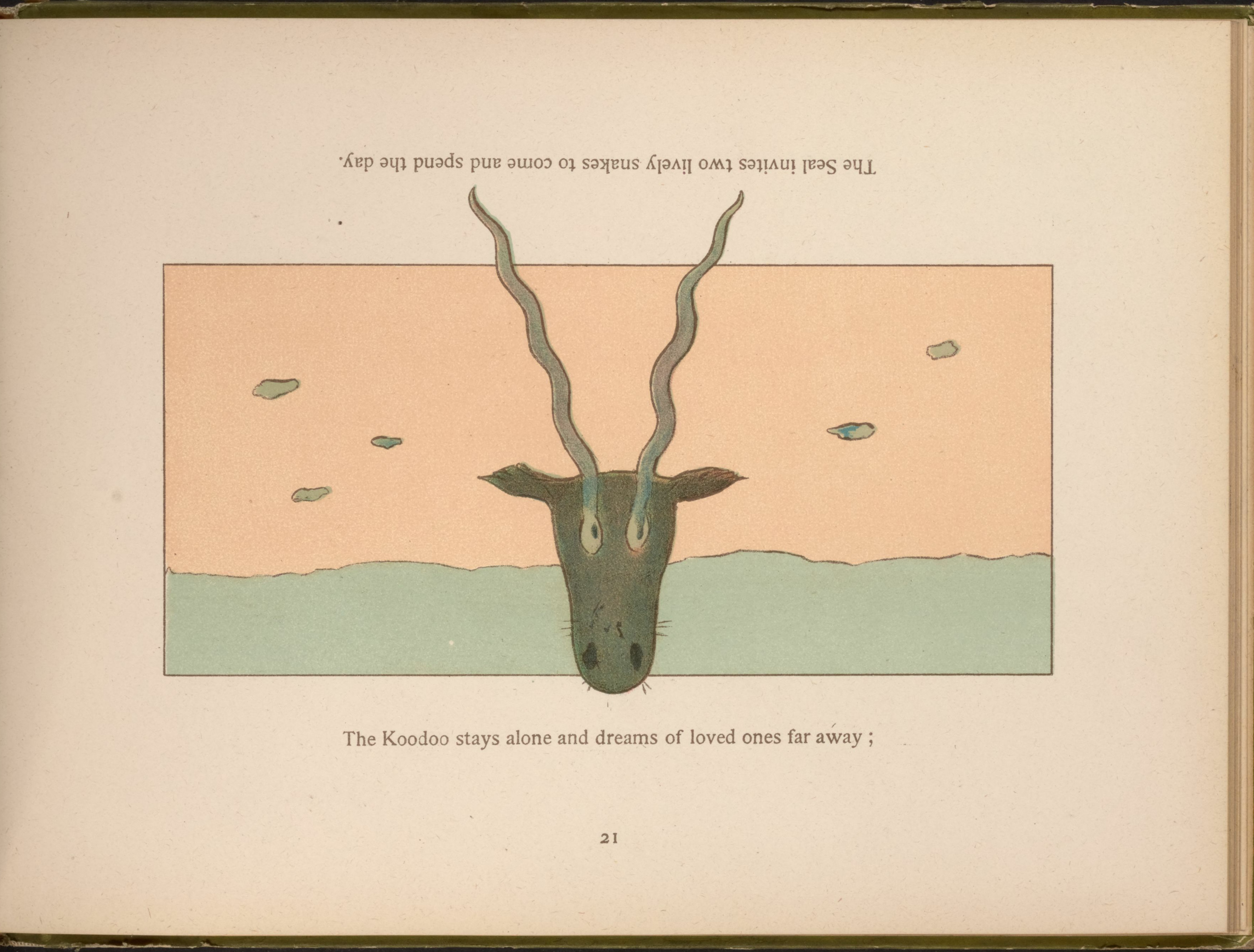
Topsys & Turvys (1893)

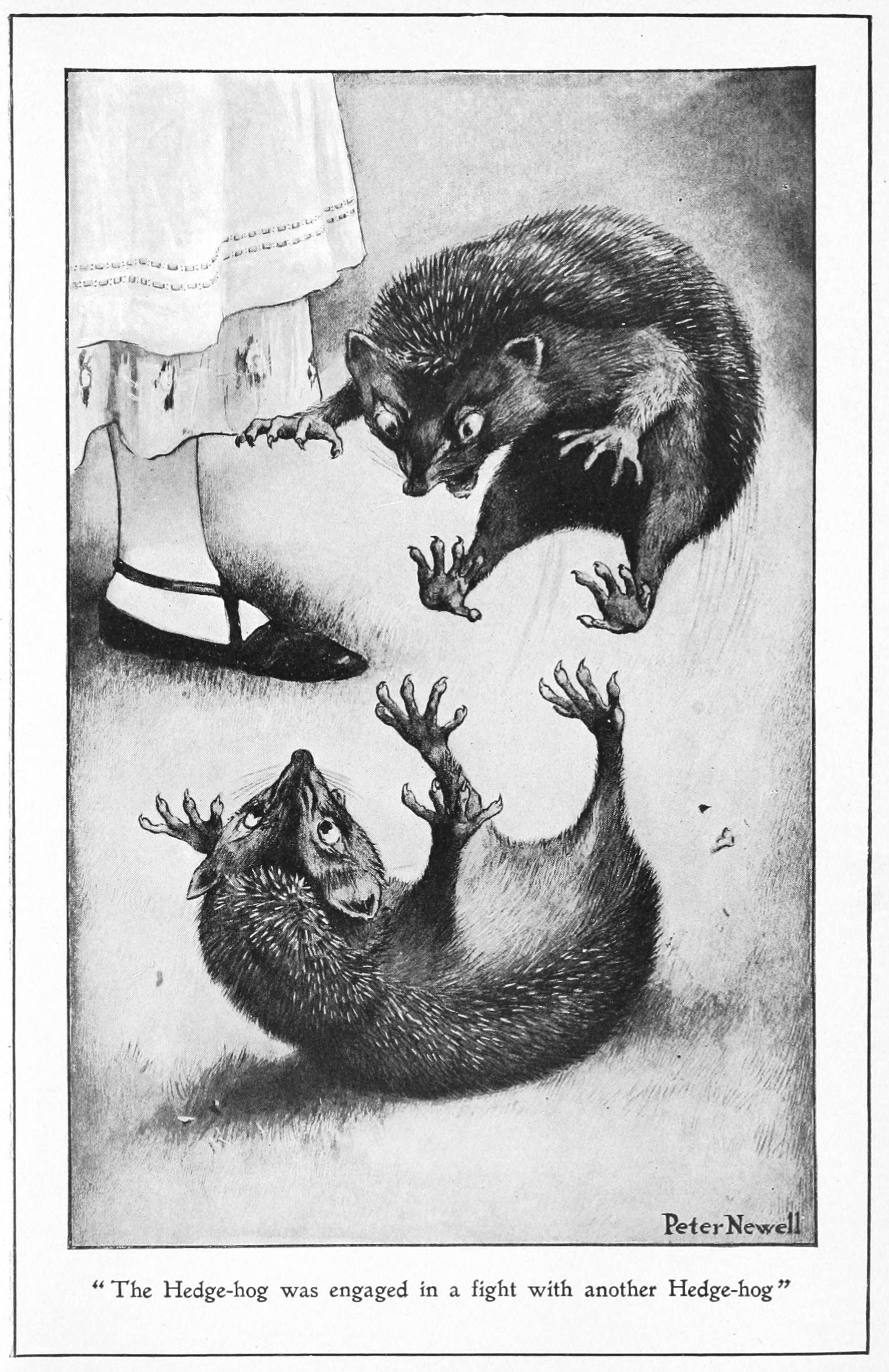
Alice's Adventures in Wonderland (1901)

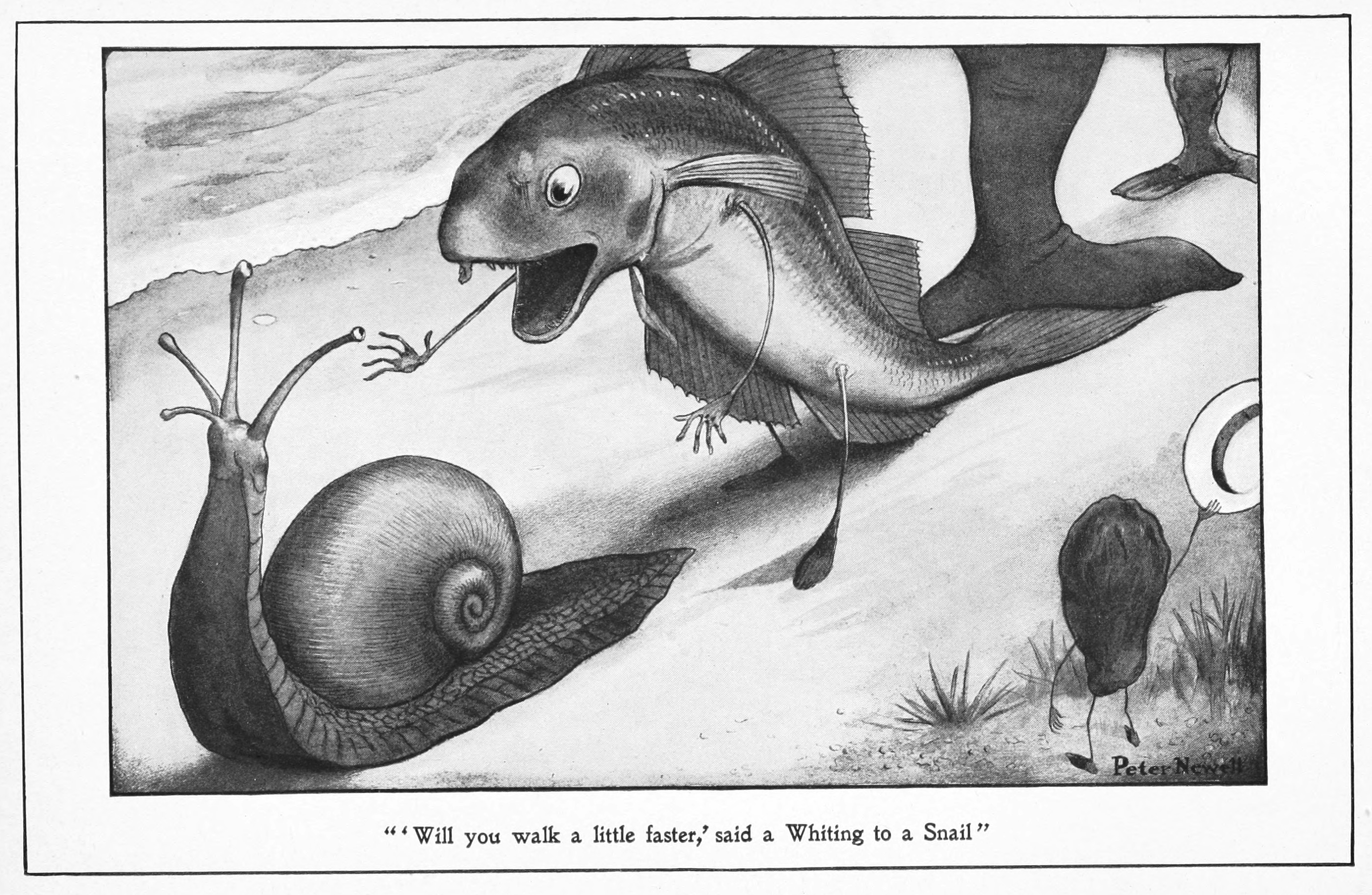
Alice's Adventures in Wonderland (1901)

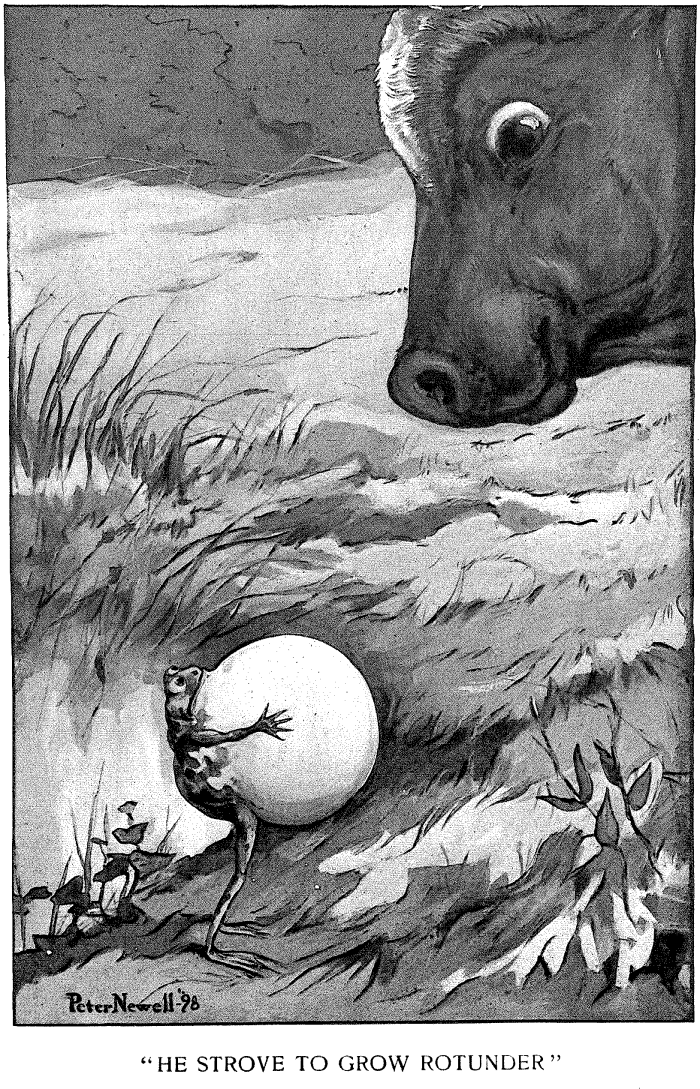
Fables for the Frivolous (1898) written by Guy Wetmore Carryl

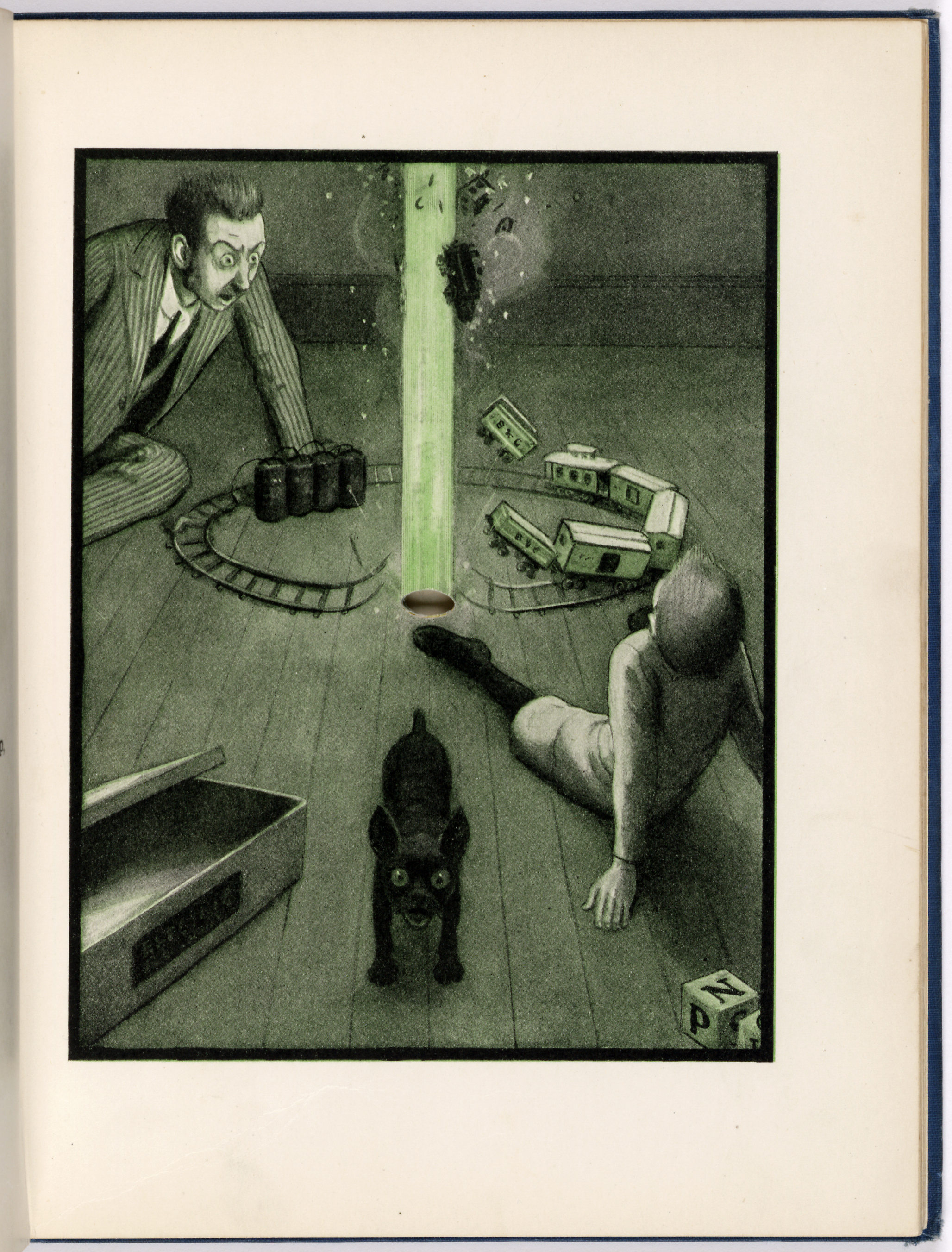
The Rocket Book (1912)

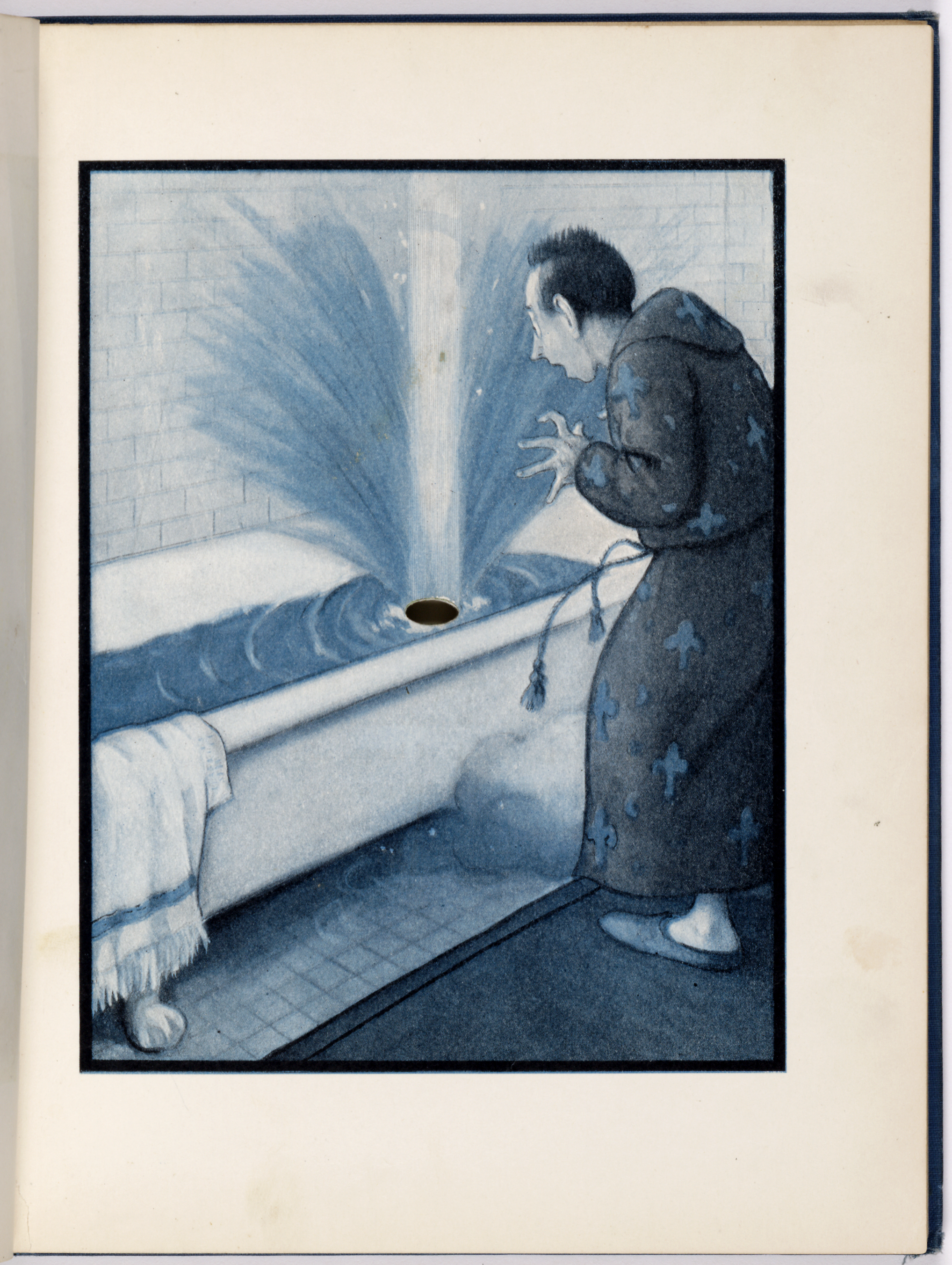
The Rocket Book (1912)

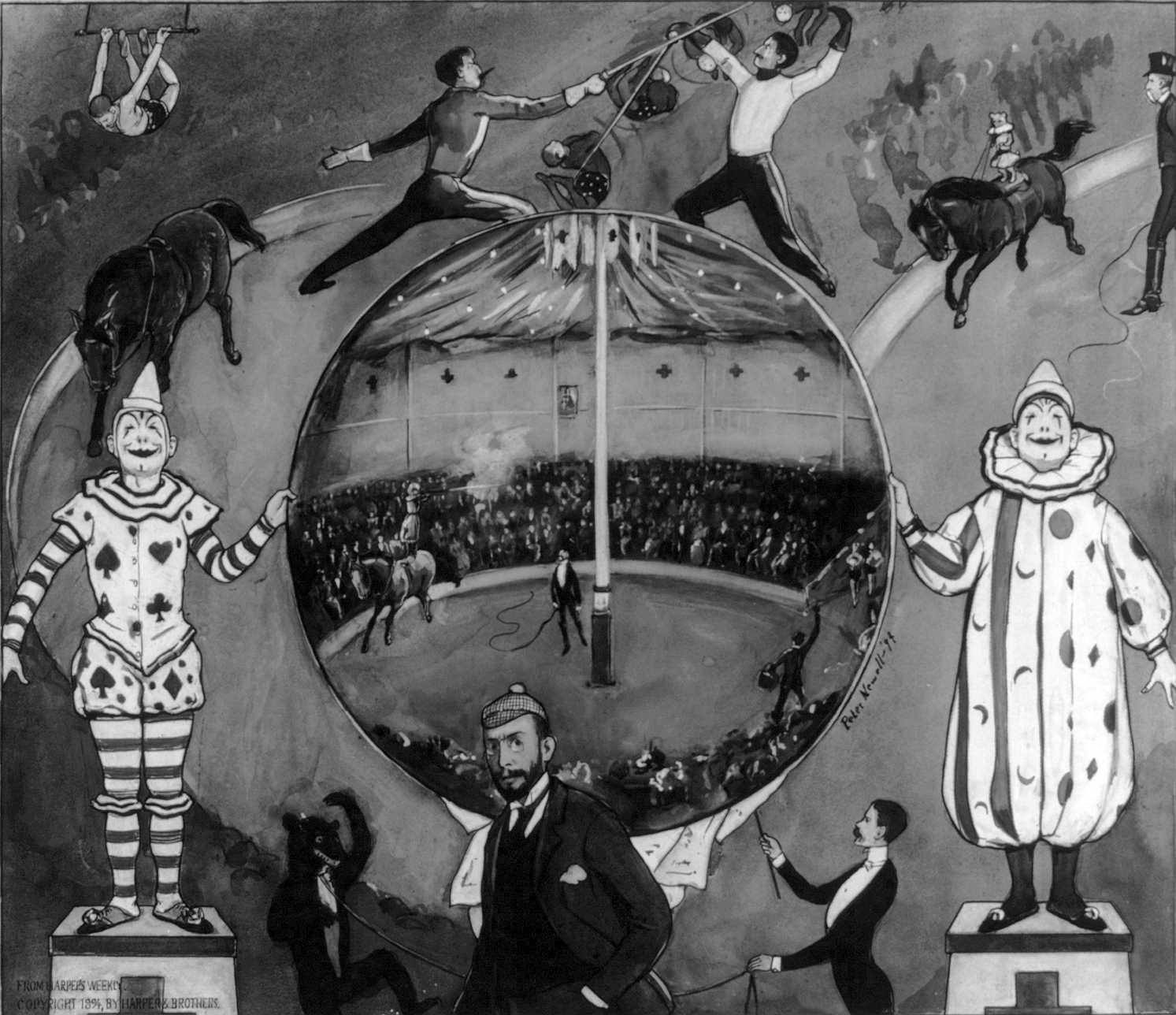
Illustration of Annie Oakley standing on a horse and holding a gun for Harper's Weekly (1894)
