= Roger Sanger =

American game designer

Roger Sanger is an American game designer and the owner of Digest Group Publications, a small publishing firm focused on the role-playing game market and specifically on the game Traveller.

== Career ==
In 1994, Roger Sanger joined "History of the Imperium Working Group" (HIWG), an international association of fans of Megatraveller a science fiction role-playing game designed by Digest Group Publications (DGP) and published by Game Designers' Workshop (GDW) in 1987. HIWG had developed a lot of significant user-generated material for the MegaTraveller universe, some of which was included in GDW's supplement Rebellion Sourcebook.

However, when Sanger joined HIWG in 1994, it was a group in crisis mode. The previous year, GDW had released a new edition, Traveller: The New Era. This edition featured harder science, and moved the timeline forward several centuries, after interstellar government and society had largely collapsed. Overnight the new edition superseded Megatraveller and made obsolete all of the material generated by HIWG over the past seven years. It also made all of the Megatraveller material produced by Digest Group Publications out of date, driving that company towards bankruptcy.

Sanger was originally interested in setting up a licensed electronic fanzine, but GDW turned down the proposal.

Sanger then approached the head of DGP, Joe Fugate, late in 1994; Sanger bought some of the remaining backstock at that time, as Fugate was still paying back creditors and holding onto boxes of the remaining DGP products he owned. Over the next nine months Sanger came to an agreement in which he would pay Fugate a few thousand dollars for what assets, copyrights and trademarks remained of DGP; Fugate would retain the larger debts, but Sanger would take care of the smaller debts. Fugate agreed to this arrangement, and Sanger became owner of DGP.

By this time, GDW had gone out of business, and Marc Miller, original creator of Traveller, had published Marc Miller's Traveller, a throwback to the original vision of Traveller and Megatraveller. Sanger initially wanted to republish DGP material and support this new edition, but Sanger and Miller could not agree on licensing fees.

With no license agreement, Sanger decided to design a new role-playing system, MacroCosm, but that product was never released.
