= Traveller Supplement 8: Library Data (A-M) =

Science-fiction role-playing game supplement

Supplement 8: Library Data (A-M)
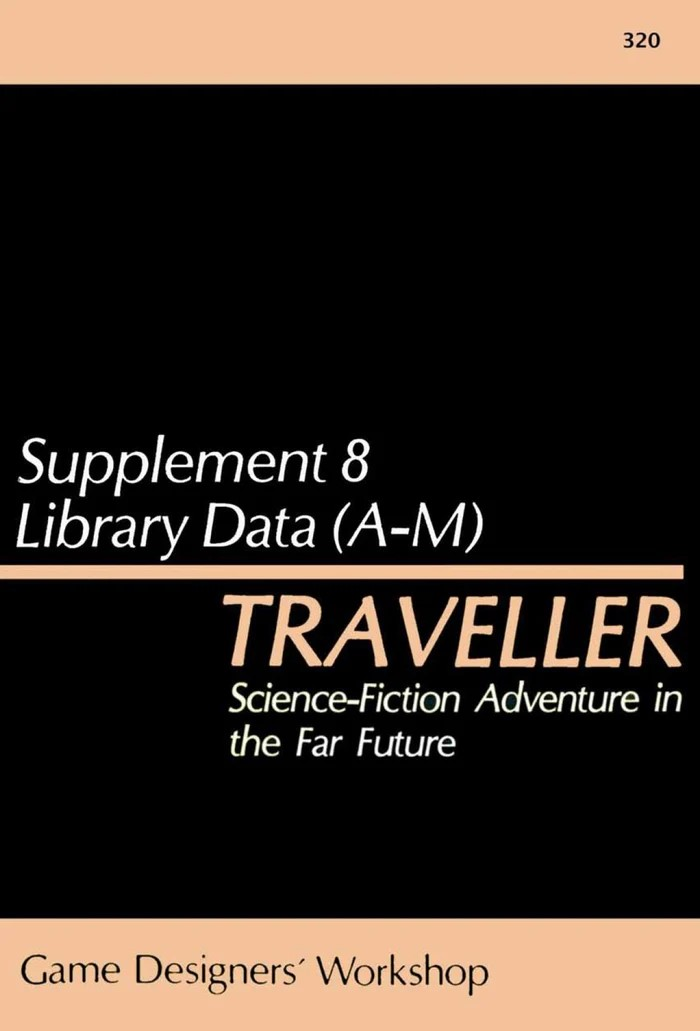
- Designers: Frank Chadwick; John Harshman; Marc W. Miller; Loren K. Wiseman
- Publishers: Game Designers' Workshop
- Publication: 1981; 44 years ago
- Genres: Science fiction
- Systems: Classic Traveller

Traveller Supplement 8: Library Data (A-M) is a 1981 tabletop role-playing game supplement written by Frank Chadwick, John Harshman, Marc W. Miller, and Loren K. Wiseman for Traveller published by Game Designers' Workshop. Thirteen Traveller supplements were published. A single collected volume was published by Far Future Enterprises in 2000.

== Contents ==
Library Data (A-M) is a supplement which covers the majority of the important library entries from the published Traveller adventures.

== Reception ==
William A. Barton reviewed Library Data (A-M) in The Space Gamer No. 46. Barton commented that "I have no real complaints at all with Library Data (A-M) – except that I wish it could have been possible to include the rest of the alphabet without dropping any of the present entries. I think you'll find it the best source of information on the Traveller universe anywhere."

Bob McWilliams reviewed Library Data (A-M) for White Dwarf #28, giving it an overall rating of 9 out of 10 for the novice (and 7 for the expert), and stated that "this is an important reference work for all Traveller players and referees who use the official Traveller campaign as a background for their adventures."

== See also ==
- Traveller Supplement 11: Library Data (N-Z)
- Classic Traveller Supplements
