= Delta Force: America Strikes Back! =

Cover art by William H. Keith Jr.

Delta Force: America Strikes Back! is a role-playing game published by Task Force Games in 1986.

== Description ==
Delta Force: America Strikes Back! is a modern military/espionage system depicting characters who are members of the West's elite anti-terrorist units including the United States' Delta Force and Britain's SAS. The basic game consists of a rule book (48 pages); a "Warbook" (40 pages) describing the composition of twenty terrorist and eight anti-terrorist groups and stats for their standard weapons, equipment and vehicles; and a book of three scenarios (32 pages). The game also includes a card stock 3-panel GM's screen.

== Character creation ==
Characters have two different types of characteristics. Primary characteristics are randomly generated by rolling 2d6 and adding 3 (creating a value range of 5 to 15). Secondary characteristics are derived from the character's primary characteristics.

=== Primary characteristics ===
The 4 primary characteristics are Strength, Agility, Dexterity, and Intelligence. Strength and Intelligence are self-explanatory, but Agility is gross motor control (like kicking a soccer ball while sprinting) and Dexterity is fine motor control (like repairing a watch or picking a lock).

=== Secondary characteristics ===
The 5 secondary characteristics (Training, Experience, Endurance, Reactions, and Stamina) are calculated from the values of the primary characteristics. Training is the amount of formal education the character has had. Experience is how much the character has learned "on the job". Endurance is a value that is like the Constitution attribute in Dungeons & Dragons except it indicates how much the character can exert themselves before falling unconscious. Carrying or dragging heavy loads, going days without sleep, not eating enough food and/or drinking enough water will subtract points while resting restores Endurance points. Reactions is the character's reflexes. Wounds affect a character's reaction rate — at zero, the character is stunned. Stamina is a value that is like Hit Points in Dungeons & Dragons. It indicates how much damage the character can take; depleting all their Stamina means the character dies. The character's Stamina score is hidden by the game master from the player, so players are never sure how wounded or damaged their character really is.

=== Tertiary characteristics ===
The Companion Book (TF4504) added Perception, Appearance, Speech, and Attitude characteristics to flesh out the character's personality. Perception is the ability to sense or notice things (like the Perception Check in Dungeons & Dragons). The next 3 tertiary characteristics are like facets of Dungeons & Dragons' Charisma attribute. Appearance is the character's physical attractiveness. Speech is the character's ability to communicate verbally (as in lying, intimidation, fast-talking and blathering, commanding or inspiring others, etc.). Attitude is how cool the character is.

=== Skills ===
Skills are bought with points and are broadly similar to the system from Twilight:2000. "Native Skills" were acquired by the character prior to service. "Service Skills" are divided into "Basic Military" for generalized military skills and "Specialist" for advanced military skills. The Service skills are assigned via a character template and depend on the character's national military, arm and branch of service, and which anti-terrorist unit they joined. Skills are first bought as a generic level (say, in "Climbing") and can be specialized in a related skill (like in "Mountain Climbing").

== Adventure modules ==
- Terror at Sea (TF4502) The Abu Nidal Organization has hijacked an Italian cruise ship, the SS Neptuno, in the Mediterranean. The President doesn't want a repeat of the Achille Lauro incident and wants to handle the matter while it is still at sea. The team must find a way to infiltrate the ship, subdue the terrorists, and rescue the hostages. Alternately, the players represent different elements of the strategic, tactical, and diplomatic forces managing the crisis.
- Desert Sun (TF4503) Israeli intelligence has discovered that Colonel Muammar Gaddafi, the dictator of Libya, has a secret facility that is capable of producing nuclear weapons that he is using to build small portable "pony nukes". There is some chatter that Gaddafi plans on using any completed weapons in a campaign of blackmail and terrorist attacks against the West. The team has to enter Libya, find the site, obtain evidence and intelligence about the Libyan nuclear program, and then sabotage or destroy the facility.

== Publication history ==
Delta Force: America Strikes Back! (TF4501) was designed by William H. Keith Jr., who also provided the cover art. It was published in 1986 by Task Force Games as a boxed set that contained all the basic rules materials and two six-sided dice. The Delta Force Companion (TF4504) was a rules expansion that added new content.

Delta Force was the first role-playing game from Task Force Games.

== Reception ==
Phil Frances reviewed Delta Force: America Strikes Back for White Dwarf #84, and stated that it was "In all, not a bad game, I suppose, but it's very unethical and awfully tasteless."

In Issue 47 of Different Worlds, Thomas Grant called this game "a mixed success." Grant found the role-playing game system "competent though unexceptional" and the scenarios "well-written and informative." However, Grant questioned what he felt was the very pro-American anti-terrorism focus of the game. Grant concluded by giving the game a rating of 2.5 out of 4, saying, "Delta Force, for the important subject it tries to cover, is just too narrow. Still, for the student of modern 'unconventional' warfare, Delta Force can provide some important lessons."

In his 1990 book The Complete Guide to Role-Playing Games, game critic Rick Swan noted that this game "has a lot less to do with role-playing than it does with tactical wargames. The characters have no personalities to speak of, and the adventures involve little more than completing military missions, not unlike the search-and-destroy and hostage rescue scenarios in Sniper!, Squad Leader and other wargames." Swan concluded by giving this game a rating of 2.5 out of 4, saying, "Delta Force works as a reasonably challenging tactical exercise, but it misses the mark as an RPG."

== See also ==
- Behind Enemy Lines
- MERC
- Mercenaries, Spies and Private Eyes
- Millennium's End
- Recon
- Twilight: 2000 / Merc: 2000
