= Glimmerdrift Reaches =

Science-fiction role-playing game supplement

Glimmerdrift Reaches is a 1981 science fiction role-playing game supplement published by Judges Guild for Traveller.

== Contents ==
Glimmerdrift Reaches is a supplement which details a new star sector, with new star empires and their intrigues.

== Publication history ==
Glimmerdrift Reaches was written by Dave Sering and Steve Crow and was published in 1981 by Judges Guild as a 32-page book with a map.

Judges Guild published supplements for Traveller from 1979 to 1982, presenting entire sectors of the Imperium, and according to Shannon Appelcline: "The result was a set of four publications: Ley Sector (1980), Glimmerdrift Reaches (1981), Crucis Margin (1981), and Maranatha-Alkahest Sector (1981). Together these sectors comprised the Gateway Quadrant; along with complementary adventures published by Judges Guild, they offered the most comprehensive and cohesive view of any part of the Traveller universe, with the possible exception of the Spinward Marches."

== Reception ==
William A. Barton reviewed Glimmerdrift Reaches in The Space Gamer No. 42. Barton commented that "Overall, Glimmerdrift Reaches is a useful play aid for Traveller and should help make adventuring on the Trailing edge of the Imperium as diverse and as exciting as that on the Spinward side has been."

Tony Watson reviewed Glimmerdrift Reaches and Crucis Margin for Chaosium's Different Worlds magazine, and noted that "As pre-generated sectors for Traveller play go, these offerings by Judges Guild are about as good as any on the market."
