= Traveller Supplement 11: Library Data (N-Z) =

Science-fiction role-playing game supplement

Supplement 11: Library Data (N-Z)
- Designers: John Harshman; Marc W. Miller; Loren K. Wiseman
- Publishers: Game Designers' Workshop
- Publication: 1982; 43 years ago
- Genres: Science fiction
- Systems: Classic Traveller

Traveller Supplement 11: Library Data (N-Z) is a tabletop role-playing game supplement, published by Game Designers' Workshop.

== Contents ==
Library Data (N-Z) is an encyclopedia of information about the Traveller universe.

Library Data (N-Z) is a sourcebook containing data on the worlds of the Imperium and its residents, and a region map of the Imperium.

== Publication history ==
Library Data (N-Z) was written by John Harshman, Marc W. Miller, and Loren K. Wiseman for Traveller, and published by Game Designers' Workshop in 1982 as a digest-sized 48-page book.

Thirteen Traveller supplements were published. A single collected volume was published by Far Future Enterprises in 2000.

== Reception ==
William A. Barton reviewed Library Data (N-Z) in The Space Gamer No. 60. Barton commented that "Library Data (N-Z) should prove to be quite useful to any Traveller player or referee whose campaign is set in the official GDW universe."

Tony Watson reviewed Library Data (N-Z) for Different Worlds magazine and stated that "The major criticism one could make of this supplement (and one the first library volume shares) is not what is covered, but what is not. GDW's game universe is vast and diverse. and an incredible amount of material remains to be explained."

== See also ==
- Traveller Supplement 8: Library Data (A-M)
- Classic Traveller Supplements
