= Crucis Margin =

Science-fiction role-playing game supplement

Crucis Margin is a 1981 science fiction role-playing game supplement published by Judges Guild for Traveller.

== Contents ==
Crucis Margin is a supplement which details part of the Gateway Quadrant which is nearby to Imperial space.

== Publication history ==
Crucis Margin was written by Dave Sering and was published in 1981 by Judges Guild as a 32-page book with a map.

Judges Guild published supplements for Traveller from 1979 to 1982, presenting entire sectors of the Imperium, and according to Shannon Appelcline: "The result was a set of four publications: Ley Sector (1980), Glimmerdrift Reaches (1981), Crucis Margin (1981), and Maranatha-Alkahest Sector (1981). Together these sectors comprised the Gateway Quadrant; along with complementary adventures published by Judges Guild, they offered the most comprehensive and cohesive view of any part of the Traveller universe, with the possible exception of the Spinward Marches."

== Reception ==
William A. Barton reviewed Crucis Margin in The Space Gamer No. 46. Barton commented that "Crucis Margin will undoubtedly open up new areas of adventure on the trailing edge of the Imperium for those adventurers looking to escape the ravages of the Fifth Frontier War to spinward. Unless the dollar price hike over the earlier sectors is too much for you, this supplement should join them in your Traveller library."

Tony Watson reviewed Glimmerdrift Reaches and Crucis Margin for Chaosium's Different Worlds magazine, and noted that "As pre-generated sectors for Traveller play go, these offerings by Judges Guild are about as good as any on the market."
