= GURPS Traveller =

Tabletop role-playing game

Science fiction adventure in the far future
- Second edition cover
- Designers: Loren Wiseman
- Publishers: Steve Jackson Games
- Publication: 1998; 28 years ago
- Genres: Science fiction
- Systems: GURPS third edition

GURPS Traveller is a science fiction sourcebook for the GURPS (Generic Universal Role-Playing System), written by Loren Wiseman, and published by Steve Jackson Games in 1998. It uses an alternate setting based on the Third Imperium from the original Traveller role-playing game.

== History ==
Steve Jackson had long been a fan of Traveller, and had previously talked to Digest Group Publications about publishing GURPS Traveller in the late 1980s. Following the 1996 dissolution of Game Designers' Workshop (GDW), Jackson obtained the Traveller license from Marc Miller, while Miller simultaneously licensed Traveller to Imperium Games. Jackson had Loren Wiseman (formerly of GDW) produce GURPS Traveller, set in an alternate history timeline since the classic Traveller setting was then licensed to Imperium Games. Following its publication, Steve Jackson Games (SJG) published many supplements to 2003. The Journal of the Travellers Aid Society was brought back as an online magazine similar to Pyramid in 2000.

The game uses the GURPS third edition rules, and takes place in an alternate timeline in which no rebellion had occurred, and the AI Virus was never released. SJG has produced over 30 supplements for the line, including details for all of the major races, many of the minor races, interstellar trade, expanded world generation, the military forces of the Third Imperium, and starships. The game is often referred to as "GT". Wiseman was the GURPS Traveller line manager and editor of the online magazine Journal of the Travellers Aid Society.

In August 2007, Mongoose Publishing announced changes in Traveller license and a strongly supported reintroduction of the Traveller system: Steve Jackson Games licence for the Journal of the Travellers Aid Society ran until the end of 2011. The distribution of physical GURPS Traveller products by Steve Jackson Games finally ceased at the end of 2015, but PDF copies remain available from SJ Games web store in 2025,

== GURPS fourth edition ==
In August 2004, GURPS fourth edition was released. In February, 2006, SJG released GURPS Traveller: Interstellar Wars. It included updated versions of the mechanics found in the previous edition, including system generation, starship construction, starship combat, interstellar trade, and a new setting.

While GURPS Traveller was set in an alternate timeline of the Third Imperium, GURPS Traveller: Interstellar Wars is set almost 2500 years prior to the founding of the Third Imperium, with a default year of A.D. 2170. The humans from Earth finally invent a faster-than-light drive for their space ships. They soon make first-contact with extraterrestrial aliens, and those aliens are human.

== Publications ==
- GURPS Traveller, Science Fiction Adventure in the Far Future (1998) by Loren Wiseman.
- GURPS Traveller: Alien Races 1 (1998) by David L. Pulver. Races include the human-descended Zhodani, the Vargr, and three minor races.
- GURPS Traveller: Alien Races 2 (1998) by Andy Slack. Races include the Aslan, K'kree, and three minor races.
- GURPS Traveller: Alien Races 3 (2000) by David Nilsen, David L. Pulver, Andy Slack, and David Thomas. Races include the Hivers, Droyne, and two minor races.
- GURPS Traveller: Alien Races 4 (2001) Includes 16 intelligent races from across space.
- GURPS Traveller: Behind the Claw
- GURPS Traveller: Deck Plan 1 Beowulf-Class Free Trader
- GURPS Traveller: Deck Plan 2 Modular Cutter
- GURPS Traveller: Deck Plan 3 Empress Marava-Class Far Trader
- GURPS Traveller: Deck Plan 4 Assault Cutter
- GURPS Traveller: Deck Plan 5 Sulieman-Class Scout/Courier
- GURPS Traveller: Deck Plan 6 Dragon-Class System Defense Boat
- GURPS Traveller: Droyne Coyn Set
- GURPS Traveller: Far Trader
- GURPS Traveller: First In
- GURPS Traveller: Flare Star PDF
- GURPS Traveller: GM's Screen
- GURPS Traveller: Ground Forces
- GURPS Traveller: Heroes 1 - Bounty Hunters
- GURPS Traveller: Humaniti
- GURPS Traveller: Imperial Navy
- GURPS Traveller: Interstellar Wars
- GURPS Traveller: Modular Cutter
- GURPS Traveller: Nobles
- GURPS Traveller: Planetary Survey 1 - Kamsii
- GURPS Traveller: Planetary Survey 2 - Denuli
- GURPS Traveller: Planetary Survey 3 - Granicus
- GURPS Traveller: Planetary Survey 4 - Glisten
- GURPS Traveller: Planetary Survey 5 - Tobibak
- GURPS Traveller: Planetary Survey 6 - Darkmoon
- GURPS Traveller: Psionics Institutes PDF
- GURPS Traveller: Rim of Fire
- GURPS Traveller: Star Mercs
- GURPS Traveller: Starports
- GURPS Traveller: Starships
- GURPS Traveller: Sword Worlds

Steve Jackson Games also published the Journal of the Travellers' Aid Society, the official magazine of Traveller.

== Reviews ==
- Casus Belli #117
