= American Combat Vehicle Handbook =

Tabletop role-playing game supplement

American Combat Vehicle Guide
- Publishers: Game Designers' Workshop
- Publication: 1990; 36 years ago
- Genres: Post apocalyptic military
- Systems: percentile

American Combat Vehicle Guide is a 1990 role-playing supplement for Twilight: 2000 published by Game Designers' Workshop.

== Contents ==
American Combat Vehicle Guide is a supplement in which more than 60 vehicles are described.

== Reception ==
Allen Mixson reviewed American Combat Vehicle Handbook in White Wolf #30 (Feb., 1992), rating it a 4 out of 5 and stated that "Since this book, like the Soviet and Nato counterparts, can be used with the 2nd Edition rules for Twilight 2000 and other similar system games like Merc: 2000, Cadillacs and Dinosaurs and Dark Conspiracy, you get a lot for your money. I wonder if a FAV can outrun a T. Rex?"

== Reviews ==
- Terra Traveller Times (Number 33 - Mar 1991)
- Voyages to the Worlds of SF Gaming (Issue 14 - Jan 1991)
