= Rebellion Sourcebook =

Tabletop science fiction role-playing game supplement

MegaTraveller
Rebellion Sourcebook
- Cover by A.C. Farley
- Designers: Marc W. Miller
- Publishers: Game Designers' Workshop
- Publication: 1988; 37 years ago
- Genres: Science fiction
- Systems: 2D6 based task system
- ISBN: 978-0943580630

Rebellion Sourcebook is a supplement published by Game Designers' Workshop (GDW) in 1988 for the science fiction role-playing game MegaTraveller.

== Contents ==
As the Imperium fractures apart following the assassination of the emperor, Rebellion Sourcebook describes all of its major factions. The book is divided into several sections:

- "The Assassination" describes the assassination of the Imperial family.
- "The Rebellion" describes events over the next three years as various factions form.
- "Ripples Through the Imperium" describes the varying speeds that news of the assassinations reaches far-flung regions of the Imperium.
- "The Nature of Rebellion" describes various tactics used for conquest.
- Each of the factions is described in detail.
- "Historical Notes on the Rebellion" describes the conquests by various factions.
- A chapter is also devoted to equipment and vehicles.
- "Nail Mission" is a short scenario sending the player characters on a mission to reach a distant depot for spare parts.

== Publication history ==
GDW first published the space opera role-playing game Traveller in 1977, and many adventures and supplements followed. Ten years later, in an attempt to revitalize the franchise, GDW revised the rules and published it as MegaTraveller. A new storyline about the breakdown of the Imperium was presented in 1988's Rebellion Sourcebook, a 96-page softcover book by Marc W. Miller with contributions by Ed Edwards, Joe D. Fugate Sr., Gregg Giles, John Meyers, Mike Mikesh, Marc W. Miller, Jefferson Swycaffer, and Gary L. Thomas, with interior art by Timothy Bradstreet, Rob Caswell, Steven S. Crompton, Liz Danforth, Jeff Dee, Bryan Gibson, Tom Peters, and A.C. Farley, with cover art by Farley.

== Reception ==
Jake Thornton reviewed Rebellion Sourcebook for Games International magazine, and gave it 3 1/2 stars out of 5, and stated that "if you don't play Traveller then it's useless, if you intend to run a game it's essential. 'Nuff said."

In the January 1989 edition of Dragon (#241), Jim Bambra called this sourcebook "solid support for the Megatraveller game. Bambra was disappointed by the brevity of the adventure included in the book, saying, "The adventure outline is thin, requiring substantial amounts of work by the referee." However, he concluded that this book was "an excellent resource for anyone running adventures in what remains of the Imperium [...] This is another fine addition to the Megatraveller game."

== See also ==
- List of MegaTraveller publications
