= White Eagle (Twilight: 2000) =

Post apocalyptic tabletop role-playing game supplement

The Fate of All Poland Hangs in the Balance
- Cover by Jim Holloway
- Designers: Loren K. Wiseman
- Publishers: Game Designers' Workshop
- Publication: 1990; 36 years ago
- Genres: Post apocalyptic military
- Systems: Twilight: 2000
- ISBN: 1558780335

White Eagle is an adventure published by Game Designers' Workshop (GDW) in 1990 for the post-apocalyptic military tabletop role-playing game Twilight: 2000.

== Content ==
In the original Twilight: 2000 game, many of the adventures focus on soldiers stranded in Central Europe following a fictional World War III known in the game as the "Twilight War". White Eagle is the third part of the Return to Europe trilogy, preceded by The Free City of Krakow (1985), and The Black Madonna (1985). This adventure is set in Silesia about a year after the events of the first two adventures. The player characters' nemesis, General Julian Filipowitz, has become the despot King Julian. The player characters join forces with the People's Army to attempt to overthrow the tyrant.

== Publication history ==
GDW published the first edition of Twilight: 2000 in 1984. Many adventures and supplements followed including White Eagle, a 48-page book published in 1990 that was written by Loren K. Wiseman, with interior art by Tim Bradstreet, Liz Danforth, and Kirk Wescom, and cover art by Jim Holloway.

White Eagle was the last adventure published for the first edition of Twilight: 2000 — shortly after its release, GDW published a second edition of the game.

== Reception ==
Allen Mixson reviewed the product in the February–March 1991 issue of White Wolf. He stated, "I will certainly recommend White Eagle as a continuation of the adventures in Poland. I hope future releases will include another chapter in this saga." He rated it overall at 3 out of a possible 5 points.

In a retrospective review of White Eagle in Black Gate, Patrick Kanouse said "White Eagle concludes the Return to Europe campaign. It is fitting that it returns to some of the original stomping grounds for the opening salvos in Twilight: 2000: Silesia and the city of Krakow."

== Reviews ==
- Terra Traveller Times, Issue 28 (March 1990, p. 5)
- Far & Away, Issue 2 (November 1990, p. 56)
