= Maranantha-Alkahest Sector =

Science-fiction role-playing game supplement

Maranantha-Alkahest Sector is a 1982 role-playing game supplement published by Judges Guild for Traveller.

== Contents ==
Maranantha-Alkahest Sector is a supplement which describes a sector in the Gateway Quadrant.

== Publication history ==
Maranantha-Alkahest Sector is the fourth sector sourcebook published by Judges Guild for Traveller.

Maranantha-Alkahest Sector was written by Dave Sering and was published in 1981 by Judges Guild as a 32-page book with a large map.

Judges Guild published supplements for Traveller from 1979 to 1982, presenting entire sectors of the Imperium, and according to Shannon Appelcline: "The result was a set of four publications: Ley Sector (1980), Glimmerdrift Reaches (1981), Crucis Margin (1981), and Maranatha-Alkahest Sector (1981). Together these sectors comprised the Gateway Quadrant; along with complementary adventures published by Judges Guild, they offered the most comprehensive and cohesive view of any part of the Traveller universe, with the possible exception of the Spinward Marches."

== Reception ==
William A. Barton reviewed Maranantha-Alkahest Sector in The Space Gamer No. 49. Barton commented that "The only real problem with this supplement is the usual, sloppy JG editing. The large map is a bit unwieldly [sic], as have been all of JG's maps of late. Overall, however, Maranantha-Alkahest Sector provides some more interesting places to adventure and is recommended to those who want to further add to their atlases of the Traveller universe."
