= RDF Sourcebook =

1986 Post apocalyptic military tabletop role-playing game supplement

- Cover by Steve Venters
- Designers: Frank Frey
- Publishers: Game Designers' Workshop
- Publication: 1986; 39 years ago
- Genres: Post apocalyptic military
- Systems: Twilight: 2000

RDF Sourcebook is a supplement published by Game Designers' Workshop (GDW) in 1986 for the near future post-apocalyptic role-playing game Twilight: 2000 that places gameplay in Iran.

== Contents ==
"RDF" stands for "Rapid Deployment Force", an American concept in the 1980s for a small but potent mobile force that could be quickly deployed to trouble spots in the world to defend American interests. RDF Sourcebook presents information on Iran and the surrounding area before and after a fictional Third World War; it includes a map of southern Iran, orders of battle for the US and Soviet forces in the area, and information on important non-player characters.

The book includes:

- Map of southern Iran
- Character generation tables for soldiers of various nationalities, including American, British, Soviet, and Iranian.
- Order of Battle for all forces that remain in the area after the nuclear war
- Specifications for 30 vehicles and weapons
- Biographies of major notable personalities in the region and various organizations

== Publication history ==
GDW published the post-apocalyptic role-playing game Twilight: 2000 in 1984 that posited a nuclear war between the United States and the Soviet Union that was followed by a conventional war. It is in the world of the conventional war that the role-playing takes place. GDW published a number of adventures and supplements for the system, including RDF Sourcebook, a 48-page softcover book written by Frank Frey, with Loren Wiseman and Frank Chadwick, with interior art by Tim Bradstreet and Liz Danforth, and rear cover art by Steve Venters. It was published by GDW in 1986.

Frank Frey wrote several pages of additional rules for aircraft, published in GDW's magazine Challenge, to be used with the upcoming sourcebook.

== Reception ==
In Issue 80 of Space Gamer/Fantasy Gamer, Richard A. Edwards thought the book would be very useful for gamemasters, saying "While those looking for specific mission briefings will be disappointed, players and referees of Twilight: 2000 will find RDF Sourcebook to be indispensable for providing new character generation tables and equipment lists."

In a retrospective review of RDF Sourcebook in Black Gate, Patrick Kanouse noted that "armed with the RDF Sourcebook and the voluminous extra information in [Twilight:2000 adventure] King’s Ransom, any gaming group will be able to find hours of play and adventure in Iran. Kanouse concluded, "The book is, in the end, an excellent resource for groups wanting to play in a region outside Europe and the US."
