= Survival Margin: Gateway to the New Era =

Science-fiction role-playing game supplement

Survival Margin
Gateway to the New Era
- Publishers: Game Designers' Workshop
- Publication: 1993; 33 years ago
- Genres: Science fiction
- Systems: MegaTraveller (2D6)

Survival Margin: Gateway to the New Era is a 1993 role-playing supplement for MegaTraveller, the second edition of Traveller, published by Game Designers' Workshop.

== Contents ==
Survival Margin: Gateway to the New Era is a supplement in which information is presented about the fall of the Third Imperium.

== Publication history ==
Shannon Appelcline explained that with Traveller: The New Era, "GDW did something very surprising: they destroyed the Imperium. A book called Survival Margin (1993) artfully detailed the transition from MegaTraveller through Hard Times into the New Era in prose form. It described how, in 1130, a 'final weapon' was accidentally unleashed: a high-tech computer virus. It ripped through technological systems across the Imperium, effectively shutting down civilisation and star travel alike. Now in The New Era, dated 1200 on the Imperial calendar, mankind was slowly reaching back for the stars."

== Reception ==
Brennan O'Brien reviewed Survival Margin in White Wolf #37 (July/Aug., 1993), rating it a 4 out of 5 and stated that "Survival Margin rates solidly by default. It's not so much that the product is incredible, but that it does exactly what I expected it to do, providing solid background material and bridging the gap between Megatraveller and New Era. It is a good supplement, worth the price if you need or want the material it covers."

== Reviews ==
- The Last Province (Issue 4 - June / July 1993)
- Terra Traveller Times (Number 41 - Jan 1994)
- AAB Proceedings (Issue 21)
- Dragon #203
