= Star Crystal (video game) =

1985 video game

- Publisher(s): Ba'rac Limited
- Release: 1985

Star Crystal is a 1985 video game published by Ba'rac Limited.

== Gameplay ==
Star Crystal is a game in which the Spinward Marches of the Traveller role-playing game is the setting of a text adventure.

== Reception ==
Johnny L. Wilson reviewed the game for Computer Gaming World, and stated that "The scenario is well-conceived and the scientific thesis held by the deceased offers stimulation for its own campaign."
