= Gary L. Thomas (game designer) =

American game designer

- Occupation: Game designer

Gary L. Thomas is a game designer who has worked primarily on role-playing games.

== Career ==
Gary Thomas and Joe D. Fugate Sr. started Digest Group Publications (DGP) together in 1986 as a business that they ran part-time while working as editors at other jobs. Fugate published articles in their magazine The Traveller's Digest which got the attention of Marc Miller at Game Designers' Workshop, who started a long-lasting working relationship between GDW and DGP by requesting Fugate and Thomas expand and revise the material in those articles, which GDW then published as the last of the small black rulebooks for Traveller, Book 8: Robots (1986). Thomas wrote the first published MegaTraveller scenario, "Lion at Bay", which first appeared in The Traveller's Digest #9. Thomas later worked on material for TSR, the last of which was published in 1989-1991.

His D&D design work includes The Book of Lairs II (1987), Monstrous Compendium Volume 1 (1989), Monstrous Compendium Volume 2 (1989), Monstrous Compendium Forgotten Realms Appendix (1989), and The Shadow Elves (1990).
