= The Best of the Journal of the Traveller's Aid Society, Volume I =

Role-playing game magazine

The Best of the Journal of the Traveller's Aid Society
- Publisher: Game Designers' Workshop
- Founded: 1980
- Final issue Number: 4
- Country: United States
- Language: English

The Best of the Journal of the Traveller's Aid Society, Volume I is a book edited by Loren Wiseman and published in 1980 by Game Designers' Workshop.

== Contents ==
The Best of the Journal of the Traveller's Aid Society, Volume I is a compilation of selected articles from the first four issues of the Journal of the Travellers Aid Society.

== Reception ==
William A. Barton reviewed The Best of the Journal of the Traveller's Aid Society, Volume I in The Space Gamer No. 40. Barton commented that "If you missed any issues from The Journal's first year, I heartily recommend The Best of the Journal of the Traveller's Aid Society, Volume I."

== Series ==
There were three subsequent volumes, each covering selected articles from 4 issues.
