= Fire, Fusion & Steel =

Science-fiction role-playing game supplement

- Cover by Chris Foss
- Designers: David Golden; Guy Garnett
- Publishers: Game Designers' Workshop
- Publication: 1993; 33 years ago
- Genres: Science fiction
- Systems: GDW House System

Fire, Fusion & Steel is a supplement about vehicle construction published by Game Designers' Workshop (GDW) in 1993 for the third edition of the science fiction role-playing game Traveller.

== Description ==
Fire, Fusion & Steel is a 112-page softcover book designed by David Golden and Guy Garnett, with illustrations by Steve Bryant and Bryan Gibson, and cover art by Chris Foss. The focus of the book is designing various vehicles, both ground vehicles and space ships, in accordance with both the laws of physics and the rules of Traveller. Various formulae for calculating parameters are included, as well as 225 tables of reference numbers.

For example, to calculate a rocket's thrust in newtons, the player is directed to add the rocket's mass in kilograms to the square root of the rocket's designed velocity in kilometres per hour, then divide the sum by a modifier taken from Table 119.

In his 2014 book Designers & Dragons, Shannon Appelcline commented that the Traveller supplements released by GDW in 1997 "included a few more equipment books and Fire, Fusion & Steel, an extensive vehicle creation system; together these were just the sort of thing you'd expect to find in a Traveller line."

== Reception ==
Brennan O'Brien reviewed Fire, Fusion & Steel in White Wolf #47 (Sept., 1994), rating it a 4 out of 5 and stated that "For ideas and explanations of technology, this supplement is a must. Overall, much of the design sequence is well thought out and easy to apply. That said and grievances aside, I recommend this book."

In the January 1998 edition of Dragon (Issue #243), Rick Swan acknowledged that Traveller had always been fuelled by "hard science", but even so, he confessed "to being baffled by Fire, Fusion & Steel, a supplement so dense with numbers that it might as well be written in Chinese... it more closely resembles a physics text for precocious grad students." Swan concluded by giving the book an average rating of 3 stars out of 6, saying "For those of us who still count on our fingers, Fire, Fusion & Steel is about as appealing as a rat in our lunch box."

== Reviews ==
- AAB Proceedings (Issue 36)
