= Twilight Encounters =

Post-apocalyptic role-playing game supplement

- Cover art by Dell Harris
- Designers: Frank Chadwick; Loren K. Wiseman
- Publishers: Game Designers' Workshop
- Publication: 1990; 36 years ago
- Genres: Post apocalyptic military
- Systems: percentile

Twilight Encounters is a supplement published by Game Designers' Workshop (GDW) in 1990 for the post-apocalyptic military role-playing game Twilight: 2000 .

== Description ==
Twilight Encounters is a supplement that includes revised and expanded rules system for combat, updated tables for random encounters, and ten "encounter cards" that set out short adventures. These include investigations or raids on a pirate-held lighthouse, a marauder encampment, a fortified farm, an abandoned village held by slavers, a castle, a mine, and a nuclear power plant.

== Publication history ==
In 1984, GDW published a post-apocalyptic role-playing game, Twilight: 2000, that imagined a small team of American soldiers abandoned in Europe following a limited nuclear war. In 1990, GDW prepared a second edition, and in advance of that released some of the new rules updates in Twilight Encounters, a boxed set designed by Frank Chadwick and Loren K. Wiseman, with cover art by Dell Harris, and interior art by Tim Bradstreet and Steve Venters.

== Reception ==
In Issue 46 of Abyss (Summer 1990), Dave Nalle called the set "well thought-out and comprehensive, while retaining the essential emphasis of the original game." Nalle thought the new encounter tables were "far superior to those in the original. They pull off the trick of being simultaneously detailed and flexible." Nalle also thought the new combat system was a vast improvement over the original, especially the way in which small arms were now handled. And Nalle found the encounter cards "well-prepared, with plenty of maps and reasonable suggestions for ways to fit them into the campaign." However, Nalle was disappointed that the "excessive lethality" of the game had not been changed, and also felt that the role-playing aspect in between combats was not improved. Nalle concluded, "Its sins are mainly ones of omission, but other supplements and a good GM can overcome them easily. This is definitely worth the money for a Twilight gamer."

In Issue 59 of the French games magazine Casus Belli, Pierre Lejoyeux liked the new encounter cards and the changes to combat, but was disappointed in the revisions to small arms fire, writing, "But the worst part is that firearms, from pistols to assault rifles, now only deal symbolic damage."

In Issue 75 of Polyhedron (September 1992), Roger E. Moore noted, "The two (wonderful) maps in this set can be used with any science fiction rules system and are in full color. The scenarios as equally adaptable." Moore concluded, "This is an excellent addition to your library of military adventures."

In Issue 24 of White Wolf, Allen Mixson wrote, "Twilight Encounters is worth it just for the scenarios. The fact that a rulebook with better rules comes with the set is pure gravy." Mixson concluded by giving this product a rating of 3 out of 5, saying, "The new rules should not be downplayed. They are full of much needed innovations and they speed up the play rather than detract from it."

=== Other reviews and commentary ===
- Terra Traveller Times (Number 30 - Jul 1990)
- Games Review (Volume 2, Issue 8 - May 1990)
