= Howling Wilderness (Twilight: 2000) =

1988 Post apocalyptic military tabletop role-playing game supplement

- Cover by Steve Venters
- Designers: Loren Wiseman
- Publishers: Game Designers' Workshop
- Publication: 1988; 37 years ago
- Genres: Post apocalyptic military
- Systems: Twilight: 2000
- ISBN: 978-1558780033

Howling Wilderness is a 1988 Post apocalyptic military tabletop role-playing game supplement for Twilight: 2000 published by Game Designers' Workshop.

== Contents ==
Howling Wilderness is a campaign setting supplement which details post-holocaust America, with rules for creating cities including geomorphic pieces to map cities.

== Publication history ==
Howling Wilderness was written by Loren Wiseman, with a cover by Steve Venters, and illustration by Timothy Bradstreet, and was published by Game Designers' Workshop in 1988 as a 48-page book.

== Reception ==
Stewart Wieck reviewed Howling Wilderness in White Wolf #13 (December 1988) and stated that "Author Loren K. Wiseman did fine research in preparation of the book and is to be heartily commended for a job well done. The scenario leading up to the nuclear strikes and the missile targets themselves are very plausible."

In the December 1989 edition of Dragon (Issue 152), Jim Bambra called this supplement "fairly complete" and thought it "paints a grim picture for the years to come." Bambra concluded with a strong recommendation, saying, "This is an essential purchase for GMs basing their Campaigns in the States."

In a review of Howling Wilderness in Black Gate, Patrick Kanouse said "The US supplement Howling Wilderness does for the US what the Survivor's Guide does for the UK. However, because much of the United States was covered by the adventures set in Texas, the Ozarks, Pennsylvania, Los Angeles, and New England, Howling Wilderness also gives a preview of the future."

== Reviews ==
- Polyhedron #70
