= Survivors' Guide to the United Kingdom =

1990 Post apocalyptic tabletop role-playing game supplement

- Cover by Radley Masinelli.
- Designers: Peter Phillipps
- Publishers: Game Designers' Workshop
- Publication: 1990; 36 years ago
- Genres: Post apocalyptic military
- Systems: Twilight: 2000

Survivors' Guide to the United Kingdom is a supplement published by Game Designers' Workshop (GDW) in 1990 for the post-apocalyptic role-playing game Twilight: 2000.

== Content ==
In the original Twilight: 2000 game, many of the first adventures centred around a military unit stranded in Central Europe following a fictional World War III known in the game as the "Twilight War". Survivors' Guide to the United Kingdom gives details of how to create a campaign setting for adventures set in Great Britain.

The book covers:

- Year by year effects of World War III on Great Britain, 1996–2000
- Subsequent changes to geography, living conditions, the economy, and available armaments
- A guide to various regions
- Notable personalities
- Various military and militia units and intelligence agencies
- Random encounters

== Publication history ==
GDW published the first edition of Twilight: 2000 in 1984. Many adventures and supplements followed including Survivors' Guide to the United Kingdom in 1990, a 48-page softcover book written by Peter Phillipps, with interior art by Kirk Wescom and Tim Bradstreet, and cover art by Radley Masinelli.

Survivors' Guide to the United Kingdom was one of the last supplements published for the first edition of Twilight: 2000, since shortly after its release, GDW published a second edition of the game.

== Reception ==
Allen Mixson reviewed the product in a 1991 issue of White Wolf Magazine, highly recommending it and rating it a 4 out of a possible 5 overall.

In a review of Survivors' Guide to the United Kingdom in Black Gate, Patrick Kanouse said "The Survivor's Guide to the United Kingdom is the only official supplement by the late GDW that covers the isles. And the situation is not good in the old country."

== Other reviews ==
- Terra Traveller Times, Issue 30 (July 1990, p. 5)
- Games Review, Vol. 2, Issue 8 (May 1990, p.43)
