= Special Operations (Twilight: 2000) =

- Publishers: Game Designers' Workshop
- Publication: 1992; 34 years ago
- Genres: Post apocalyptic military
- Systems: Twilight: 2000

Special Operations is a 1992 role-playing supplement for Twilight: 2000 published by Game Designers' Workshop.

== Contents ==
Special Operations is a supplement in which information is presented on intelligence agencies and special forces.

== Reception ==
Allen Mixson reviewed Special Operations in White Wolf #38 (1993), rating it a 4 out of 5 and stated that "The adventures alone are worth the price. Add to these a booklet chock-full of floor plans, diagrams and information on intelligence/spec ops agencies, and it is easy to see why Special Operations gets high ratings."

== Reviews ==
- The Last Province (Issue 1 - Oct 1992)
- Terra Traveller Times (Number 39 - Jul 1992)
