= Going Home (Twilight: 2000) =

Role playing game adventure

Going Home is a 1986 role-playing game adventure published by Game Designers' Workshop for Twilight: 2000.

== Plot summary ==
Going Home is an adventure in which the player characters must cross Poland and Germany to catch their ship back to the United States in time.

== Publication history ==
Going Home was written by Loren K. Wiseman, and was published by Game Designers' Workshop in 1986 as a 48-page book.

== Reception ==
In a retrospective review of Going Home in Black Gate, Patrick Kanouse said "Despite its presumed ending, Going Home still preserves the essence of the sandbox game by giving the players complete control over their fate. They could reject outright the notion (or as in my campaign, my brother plays a team of spetsnaz who have varied interests — including their own version of going home. It is a satisfying conclusion to the campaign, despite coming after the masterful The Black Madonna."

Going Home was awarded the H.G. Wells Award for "Best Roleplaying Adventure of 1986".
