= Journal of the Travellers Aid Society =

Science-fiction role-playing magazine

Journal of the Travellers' Aid Society
- Issue 1 cover by Winchell Chung
- Publisher: Game Designers' Workshop; Imperium Games; Steve Jackson Games; Mongoose Publishing
- Founder: Loren K. Wiseman
- Founded: 1979
- Final issue Number: 1985 (GDW); 1997 (Imperium Games); 25
- Country: United States
- Language: English
- ISSN: 0193-3124

Journal of the Travellers' Aid Society is a role-playing game magazine devoted to Traveller, commonly abbreviated JTAS.

== History ==
Loren K. Wiseman created a magazine in 1979 to support Traveller, with Game Designers' Workshop publishing The Journal of the Travellers' Aid Society (JTAS), which Wiseman would continue to develop as its editor. J. Andrew Keith wrote so much material for JTAS that he used the pseudonyms John Marshal and Keith Douglass (although a reader performed a word-use analysis of these articles and realized that the same person wrote them all). Marc Miller decided that, rather than using modern dates for the magazine, each issue would instead be based on the in-game calendar of the Imperium, which advanced roughly 90 days for each quarterly issue. JTAS #2 (1979) began to include in-universe excerpts from the fictional 'Traveller News Service', which talked about 'current' events going on in the Imperium; that issue was dated 274–1105, and included two news excerpts from Regina sector, which were dated 097-1105 and 101–1105 on the Imperium calendar. JTAS #9 (1981) contributed to the development of the Traveller metaplot by detailing the beginning of a war with the alien Zhodani species. The original run of the magazine ended with The Journal of the Travellers' Aid Society #24 (1984), but GDW replaced it with the magazine Challenge, continuing the numbering from JTAS with issue #25 (1986) but included material for all games published by GDW rather than just Traveller.

Imperium Games published Journal of the Travellers' Aid Society #25 in 1996, and published just the next issue of the Journal of the Travellers' Aid Society as their final issue in 1997.

Steve Jackson Games obtained a license for the Traveller setting, so they brought back Journal of the Travellers' Aid Society as an online magazine in 2000.

Mongoose Publishing produced six volumes of Journal of the Travellers' Aid Society in 2020 as part of their Traveller licence. Journal of the Traveller’s Aid Society, Volume I is 128 pages long and contains two adventures.

== Name ==
The Journal of the Travellers Aid Society takes its name from the fictional Travellers' Aid Society (TAS) that was first mentioned in the original incarnation of the Traveller game published by Game Designers Workshop [GDW]. In the original Traveller game, it was not too uncommon for characters to obtain membership in the TAS during character creation. The idea of the TAS is that it is an organization that exists to support what are basically 'transients,' or 'wanderers' ['Travellers' in the game's terminology] around the galaxy. It does so by maintaining low-cost hostels at many of the large starports, and, most importantly, by maintaining its 'rating system,' which warns of the dangers inherent in visiting certain worlds. Under this system, a world which should be approached with caution is denoted an 'Amber Zone,' and a world that should not be approached at all is denoted a 'Red Zone.' x§

== Issues ==
=== GDW ===
- 01 Annic Nova (1979) ASIN B004RI229S
- 02 Victoria (1979) ASIN B0027DVL9C
- 03 Asteroids (1979) ASIN B004RHU40I
- 04 Gazelle Class Close Escorts (1980) ASIN B004RHZ2K0
- 05 Imperium (1980) ASIN B001AHZJ1C
- 06 Scouts (1980) ASIN B000QYIUX4
- 07 Starports (1981) ASIN B002GUOU76
- 08 Broadsword Class Mercenary Cruisers (1981) ASIN B000QYIYT4
- 09 WAR! (1981) ASIN B000QYH9E0
- 10 Planet Building (1981) ASIN B001CZ8Z54
- 11 Striker (1981) ASIN B000QYFZZU
- 12 Merchant Prince, including Special Supplement 1, Merchant Prince (1982 ASIN B000QYJ7YA
- 13 Hivers (1982) ASIN B000QYG5PO
- 14 Laws and Lawbreakers (1982) ASIN B002JHEIPU
- 15 Azun (1983) ASIN B000QYHLZW
- 16 SuSAG (1983) ASIN B000QYHNIM
- 17 Atmospheres, including Special Supplement 2, Atmospheres (1983) ASIN B000QYGDWE
- 18 Travelling without Jumping (1983) ASIN B000QYHSUA
- 19 Skyport Authority (1983) ASIN B000QYHUY4
- 20 Prologue (1984) ASIN B000QYN2D2
- 21 Vargr, including Special Supplement 3: Missiles in Traveller (1984) ASIN B000QYI2IW
- 22 Port to Jumppoint (1985) ASIN B000QYJYJI
- 23 Zhodani Philosophies (1985) ASIN B000QYN9ZI
- 24 Religion in the 2000 Worlds (1985) ASIN B000QYI85E
- Best of JTAS Volume 1 Issues 1-4 (1981) ASIN B000F955T2
- Best of JTAS Volume 2 Issues 5-8 (1980) ASIN B000QYFGWM
- Best of JTAS Volume 3 Issues 9-12 (1982) ASIN B000QYFJIS
- Best of JTAS Volume 4 Issues 13-16 (1983) ASIN B000QYFKNC

=== GDW JTAS in Challenge Magazine ===
- Challenge Magazine 25 Fleet Escort Lisiani (1986) ASIN B000U338EM
- Challenge Magazine 26 Cargo (A Merchant Prince Variant) (1986) ASIN B000KTXQOS
- Challenge Magazine 27 Grandfather's Worlds (1986) ASIN B000ERM0KM
- Challenge Magazine 28 K'kree Starships (1987) ASIN B000ERI5Z6
- Challenge Magazine 29 The Sabmiqys (1987) ASIN B000KTZUDS
- Challenge Magazine 30 The Fall of the Imperium (1987) ASIN B000ERK356
- Challenge Magazine 31 Hazardous Cargoes (1987) ASIN B000KTZUBU
- Challenge Magazine 32 A World On Its Own (1988) ASIN B000G30DVM
- Challenge Magazine 33 IRIS 1 (1988) ASIN B000E5DI50
- Challenge Magazine 34 IRIS 2 (1988) ASIN B000E5ED3G
- Challenge Magazine 35 The Spice of Life (1988)
- Challenge Magazine 36 IRIS 3 (1988) ASIN B000KTZUBK

=== Imperium Games T4 - Marc Miller's Traveller ===
- Journal of the Travellers' Aid Society #25 (1996) ASIN B000F9JG2E
- Journal of the Travellers' Aid Society #26 (1997) ASIN B000NPSB0I

=== The Best of JTAS ===

- The Best of JTAS, Volume 1 (2000)
- The Best of the Journal of the Travellers' Aid Society, Volume 2: a collection of articles originally published in issues 5 through 8 of the journal. William A. Barton reviewed it in The Space Gamer No. 53. Barton commented that "The Best of the JTAS, Vol. 2 should prove welcome to anyone who missed any Journals from 5 through 8."

=== Far Future Enterprises ===
These are collections of the earlier GDW publications.

- Journal of the Travellers Aid Society Issues #1-12
- Journal of the Travellers Aid Society Issues #13-24 ISBN 978-1558782068
- Journal of the Travellers Aid Society Issues #25-33 (2004) ISBN 978-1558782075

== Reception ==
The Journal of the Travellers Aid Society won the H.G. Wells award for Best Magazine Covering Roleplaying of 1979.

William A. Barton reviewed the "Merchant Prince" supplement from Journal of the Travellers Aid Society #12 in The Space Gamer No. 53. Barton commented that "Although it probably won't totally supplant Merchants & Merchandise as the book for generating merchant characters, Merchant Prince is a well-conceived and viable alternative to M&M. Its inclusion in the Journal makes it a special bargain. I recommend it to every Traveller player, especially those who find the merchant life the most appealing."
