= 1636: Commander Cantrell in the West Indies =

2014 novel by Eric Flint and Charles Gannon

- Author: Eric Flint and Charles E. Gannon
- Cover artist: Tom Kidd
- Language: English
- Series: 1632 series
- Genre: Alternate history, science fiction
- Publisher: Baen Books
- Publication date: June 3, 2014
- Publication place: United States
- Media type: Print (hardback & paperback)
- Pages: 624 (hardback)
- ISBN: 978-1-4767-3678-5 (hardback)
- OCLC: 865496207
- Followed by: 1637: No Peace Beyond the Line

1636: Commander Cantrell in the West Indies is a novel in the 1632 series written by Eric Flint and Charles E. Gannon and published on June 3, 2014.

The story follows the adventures of Eddie Cantrell, a supporting character in 1633 and 1634: The Baltic War. Eddie is married to the daughter of the Danish King and is sent to America to set up a colony and to explore for oil in the Gulf of Mexico while defending against the Spanish and pirates.

== Literary significance and reception ==
Eric S. Raymond called the book "a solid installment in the ongoing series". The reviewer for SFRevu wrote that "This is a pretty standard Ring of Fire novel. Fans of the series will find a lot to enjoy here, even though it isn't advancing the main story line." However, he still finds the story interesting and looks forward to the continuation of this storyline. Mark Lardas of the Galveston Daily News gave a positive review. One reviewer for the Midwest Book Review called the book "an enjoyable thriller that provides readers with plenty of operational military maneuvers at sea and in Trinidad, and understanding of strategic concerns though the latter sometimes turns boring due TMI detail" while another reviewer for the same publication called it "an engrossing alternate history read highly recommended for fan of the genre". A reviewer for another publication wrote, "He [Flint] and Gannon write an intriguing tale filled with what-ifs that never strain the reader’s ability to believe this might occur. Although unfamiliar with the backstory and characters, I had no trouble following the various story threads, and the book begins with a short overview to set the stage."
