= Caesar's Legions (board game) =

1975 board wargame

Caesar's Legions is a board wargame published by Avalon Hill in 1975 that simulates various Roman campaigns in Gaul and Germany.

== Description ==
Caesar's Legions is a two-person game in which one player controls Roman Legions mounting incursions beyond the borders of the Roman Empire, and the other player controls opposing Gallic or Germanic tribes.

=== Components ===
The game includes:

- 22" x 28"" mounted hex grid map
- 448 die-cut counters
- 16-page rulebook
- 16 Tactical Cards
- various playing aids

=== Gameplay ===
Combat is resolved with a die roll that is cross-indexed on a Combat Results Table. However, the use of Tactical Cards may have an effect on the outcome.

=== Scenarios ===
The game comes with five historical scenarios:

1. Caesar's Conquest of Gaul, 58 BCE
2. Caesar's Crossing of the Rhine, 55 BCE
3. Teutoburger Wald: Quintillicus Varus walks into a trap, 9 CE
4. Idistaviso: Drusus Germanicus attempts to recover the Eagles lost in the Teutoburger Wald, 15 CE
5. Batavian Revolt, 68 CE

== Publication history ==
Loren Wiseman designed a game about the Battle of Idistaviso titled Eagles, which was published by Game Designer's Workshop in 1974. The following year, Avalon Hill acquired the rights to Eagles and Don Greenwood revised the rules significantly; this included changing the combat system to the one used in Avalon Hill's 1776, published the previous year. Greenwood also expanded the game to include four more scenarios. This expanded and revised game was titled Caesar's Legions, and was published in 1975.

In 1994, KP Games acquired the rights, and Keith Poulter expanded Caesar's Legions to include 32 scenarios and retitled the game Barbarians: 70 BC - 260 AD.

In 2010, Camelot Games acquired the rights and Craig Johnson designed an expansion to the original Caesar's Legions, which was titled Caesar in Gaul.

== Reception ==
Richard Berg reviewed Eagles, the predecessor of Caesar's Legions, and called it "an interesting failure" that "has no playability to speak of." Berg chiefly objected to the game mechanics that allowed the German chieftains to avoid combat by hiding in the forest; if discovered by the Romans, they could simply flee to a different part of the forest. Berg did admit that the production values of the game were "heads above most" with "excellent clear graphics and well made counters [...] signs of the care and preparation put into this game." But he concluded with a thumbs down, saying, "Eagles is less of an eagle and more of a turkey."

In Issue 8 of Perfidious Albion, Charles Vasey examined the historicity of this game, and immediately found problems with the lack of auxiliaries, and the effect this would have on the historical accuracy of many battles. Vasey also found the combat system was "dogged by problems.There are far too many battles to be realistic." Vasey noted that the scenario dealing with the Batavian revolt "appears to have little connection with the account of the revolt as portrayed by Tacitus, where one sees the whole campaign required a good deal of political intrigue and skill. The game tends to avoid this." Despite these problems, Vasey concluded, "Avalon Hill ... have managed to produce a game which points out some historical problems without turning into a Roman Total Victory." Later in the same issue, Vasey and Geoff Barnard discussed this game. Vasey commented, "Despite its simplicity the game has many interesting problems. The Germans ... tend to hide out in the woods always keeping their distance from the Romans. Caesar must act decisively or he will find himself chasing after Germans and never catching them." Barnard replied, "Personally, I did not like this game a great deal ... The use of the tactical cards for combat between opposing units in the same hex, coupled with a lot of rather fruitless movement seemed to give a reasonable representation of some of the things that went on at the time but I did not find it exactly exciting." Vasey concluded with a recommendation, saying, "The game could serve well as an introduction to boardgaming, being both simple, colourful and interesting." Barnard was more muted, saying, "If you like the ideas of more manoeuvre than appears inmost boardgames this will be for you."

In his 1977 book The Comprehensive Guide to Board Wargaming, Nick Palmer acknowledged that the first two scenarios of Caesar's Legions were easy enough to allow new players to learn the rules, but "Unfortunately the early scenarios are too simple for most tastes, and unbalanced in favour of the Romans. The later [scenarios], however, are absorbing and varied." He warned that "German play is always tricky, involving hit-and-run guerilla tactics." Palmer concluded that "it should appeal to anyone interested in the period, even if the Latin names are a trifle distorted at times!"

In the 1980 book The Complete Book of Wargames, game designer Jon Freeman thought the change of combat systems from the original one used in Eagles to the one used in 1776 was a questionable decision, "considering the absence of similarities in the two periods." Freeman also thought the rules revisions added "a great deal of unnecessary junk." He was disappointed in most of the scenarios, calling some of them "dull, simplistic and ahistorical", and the main scenario "a combination of hide-and-seek and ring-a-levio." He concluded by giving the game an Overall Evaluation of only "Fair", saying, "It's a lot of fire and effort, simulating nothing."

== Other reviews and commentary ==
- Fire & Movement #22
- The Wargamer Vol.1 #1
- Panzerfaust & Campaign #72
