= Soviet Combat Vehicle Handbook =

Tabletop role-playing game supplement

- Publishers: Game Designers' Workshop
- Publication: 1990; 36 years ago
- Genres: Post apocalyptic military
- Systems: percentile

Soviet Combat Vehicle Handbook is a 1990 role-playing supplement for Twilight: 2000 published by Game Designers' Workshop.

== Contents ==
Soviet Combat Vehicle Handbook is a supplement in which equipment and new vehicles are described.

== Reception ==
Allen Mixson reviewed Soviet Combat Vehicle Handbook in White Wolf #30 (Feb., 1992), rating it a 4 out of 5 and stated that "This is a well-made product and an excellent addition for any game based on the 2nd Edition rules. If you are still using the 1st Edition rules, this is a mid-priced reference."

== Reviews ==
- Terra Traveller Times (Number 33 - Mar 1991)
- Voyages to the Worlds of SF Gaming (Issue 14 - Jan 1991)
