= Brilliant Lances =

Science fiction tabletop wargame

- Publishers: Game Designers' Workshop
- Publication: 1993; 33 years ago
- Genres: Science fiction board wargame

Brilliant Lances is a 1993 game published by Game Designers' Workshop.

== Gameplay ==
Brilliant Lances is a game in which the starship combat system for Traveller: The New Era is presented.

== Reception ==
Brennan O'Brien reviewed Brilliant Lances in White Wolf #42 (April 1994), rating it a 1.5 out of 5 and stated that "GDW, as far as I'm concerned, bombs with this one. I don't like the flow of play for an RPG setting. I feel cheated by the starship design system and the quality of components is lacking. Overall, the value of Brilliant Lances is very slim."

== Reviews ==
- Shadis #12
