= Terror at Sea =

Terror at Sea is a 1986 role-playing game adventure published by Task Force Games for Delta Force: America Strikes Back!.

== Plot summary ==
Terror at Sea is an adventure in which a Navy SEAL operation is conducted to liberate an Italian cruise ship taken by hijackers. The adventure includes detailed deck plans, introduces specialized equipment, and incorporates unique parachuting mechanics.

== Publication history ==
Terror at Sea was written by William H. Keith Jr. and published by Task Force Games in 1986 as a 48-page book.

== Reviews ==
- The Imperium Staple (Issue 10 - Jan 1987)
