= Bangkok: Cesspool of the Orient =

- Publishers: Game Designers' Workshop
- Publication: 1991; 35 years ago
- Genres: Post apocalyptic military
- Systems: Twilight: 2000

Bangkok: Cesspool of the Orient is a 1991 role-playing supplement for Twilight: 2000 published by Game Designers' Workshop.

== Contents ==
Bangkok Cesspool of the Orient is a supplement in which both the squalor and the luxury of Bangkok are explored.

== Reception ==
Allen Mixson reviewed Bangkok in White Wolf #30 (Feb., 1992), rating it a 4 out of 5 and stated that "For an exotic setting, this is the book for your Twilight or MERC characters. Go for it!"

== Reviews ==
- Terra Traveller Times (Number 34 - May 1991)
- Polyhedron #70
