= Merchants & Merchandise =

Science-fiction role-playing game supplement

- Designers: Donald P. Rapp; Chuck Kallenbach; Cheryl Kallenbach
- Publishers: Paranoia Press
- Publication: 1981; 44 years ago
- Genres: Science-fiction
- Systems: Classic Traveller

Merchants & Merchandise is a 1981 role-playing game supplement for Traveller published by Paranoia Press.

== Contents ==
Merchants & Merchandise is a book with a complete character generation system for merchant characters, as well as new weapons, ships, and more items.

== Publication history ==
Merchants and Merchandise was written by Donald P. Rapp with Chuck Kallenbach and Cheryl Kallenbach and was published in 1981 by Paranoia Press as a 24-page book.

== Reception ==
William A. Barton reviewed Merchants & Merchandise in The Space Gamer No. 39. Barton commented that "No Traveller player should pass this one up."

Tony Watson reviewed Merchants and Merchandise for Different Worlds magazine and stated that "Merchants and Merchandise is a thoughtfully prepared guide to a critical aspect of any interstellar society. It's also a good example of why Paranoia Press is the best non-GDW producer of playaids for Traveller."
