= Charles E. Gannon =

American novelist and game designer

- Gannon at Dragon Con 2026 in Atlanta, GA
- Born: March 17, 1960 (age 66); Teaneck, New Jersey, U.S.
- Education: Brown University (BA); Syracuse University (MS); Fordham University (PhD)
- Occupations: Game designer, novelist
- Writing career
- Period: 1994–present
- Genre: Science fiction

Academic background
- Thesis: Speculative Fiction: Literature of Political Transformation (1998)
- Doctoral advisor: Philip Sicker

Academic work
- Discipline: English literature
- Sub-discipline: Science fiction
- Institutions: St. Bonaventure University
- Website: charlesegannon.com

Charles E. Gannon (born March 17, 1960) is an American novelist and game designer who has worked primarily on hard science fiction and role-playing games.

== Career ==
Charles Gannon wrote Hard Times (1991), a supplement for MegaTraveller which moved the background metaplot forward by six years. Gannon wrote many articles in Challenge magazine about "The Hinterworlds", a sector of space which is part of the Imperium from the Traveller universe.

Gannon has also co-written novels in the 1632 series with Eric Flint, including 1635: The Papal Stakes (2012), 1636: Commander Cantrell in the West Indies (2014), and 1636: The Vatican Sanction (2015). His novels Fire with Fire and Trial by Fire were both nominated for the Nebula Award for Best Novel (in 2014 and 2015 respectively). He was nominated again in 2016 for Raising Caine, and in 2020 for Marque of Caine.

In October 2025, Baen Books named Gannon as the series "showrunner" for the late Eric Flint's 1632 series.

== Bibliography ==
=== Tales of the Terran Republic ===
This progression of books is also known as the "Caine Riordan series" or the "22nd Century series"

- Gannon, Charles E. (2013). Fire with Fire. Riverdale, NY: Baen. ISBN 978-1-4516-3883-7. OCLC 800030905.
- Gannon, Charles E. (2014). Trial by Fire. Riverdale, NY: Baen. ISBN 978-1-4767-3664-8. OCLC 866931638.
- Gannon, Charles E. (2015). Raising Caine. Riverdale, NY: Baen. ISBN 978-1-4767-8093-1. OCLC 913470034.
- Gannon, Charles E. (2017). Caine's Mutiny. Riverdale, NY: Baen. ISBN 978-1-4767-8219-5. OCLC 952979582.
- Gannon, Charles E. (2019). Marque of Caine. Riverdale, NY: Baen. ISBN 978-1-4814-8409-1. OCLC 1086495468.
- Gannon, Charles E. (2023). Endangered Species. Baen. ISBN 978-1-982192716.
- Gannon, Charles E. (2023). Protected Species. Riverdale, NY: Baen. ISBN 978-1-9821-9307-2.
- Gannon, Charles E. Killer Species. (upcoming)

==== Spinoffs and related fiction ====
- Schmidt, Bryan T., ed. (2017). A Taste of Ashes, In Infinite Stars. Titan Books. ISBN 978-1-785655-93-7.
- Gannon, Charles E., ed. (2019). Lost Signals of the Terran Republic. Eric Flint's Ring of Fire Press. ISBN 978-1-948818-24-7. OCLC 1119557600.
- Gannon, Charles E.; et al. (author) (2020). Murphy's Lawless. Beyond Terra Press. ISBN 978-1-948818-24-7.
- Gannon, Charles E.; et al. (author) (2023). Mission Critical. Baen. ISBN 978-1982192600.
- Triage (with Eric Flint; upcoming)
- Misbegotten (upcoming): a non-mainline Terran Republic novel

=== Vortex of Worlds ===
- Gannon, Charles E. (2021). This Broken World (hardcover 1st ed.). Baen. pp. 1–608. ISBN 978-1982125714.
- Gannon, Charles E. (2023). Into the Vortex (hardcover 1st ed.). Baen. pp. 1–400. ISBN 978-1982192471.

=== Starfire series ===
- White, Steve; Gannon, Charles E. (2011). Extremis: A Starfire Novel. Baen Books. ISBN 978-1-4391-3433-7. OCLC 646112541.
- White, Steve; Gannon, Charles E. (2016). Imperative: A Starfire Novel. Baen. ISBN 978-1-4767-8119-8. OCLC 913337274.

=== The 1632 series ===
- Flint, Eric; Gannon, Charles E. (2012). 1635: The Papal Stakes. Baen. ISBN 978-1-4516-3839-4. OCLC 779265821.
- Flint, Eric; Gannon, Charles E. (2014). 1636: Commander Cantrell in the West Indies. Baen. ISBN 978-1-4767-3678-5. OCLC 865496207.
- Flint, Eric; Gannon, Charles E. (2017). 1636: The Vatican Sanctions. Baen. ISBN 978-1-4814-8277-6. OCLC 975364728.
- Flint, Eric; Gannon, Charles E. (2020). 1637: No Peace Beyond the Line. Baen. ISBN 978-1982124960.
- Gannon, Charles E.; Waters, Robert E. (April 2021). 1636: Calabar's War. Baen. ISBN 978-1982125301.

=== Black Tide Rising ===
- Gannon, Charles E.; Ringo, John (July 2020). At the End of the World. Baen. ISBN 978-1982124694.
- Gannon, Charles E.; Ringo, John (March 2021). At the End of the Journey. Baen. ISBN 978-1982125226.
