= Traveller Book 8: Robots =

Science-fiction role-playing game

Book 8: Robots
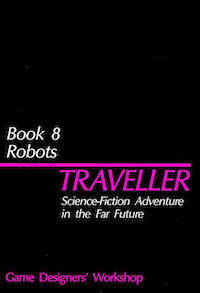
- Designers: Joe D. Fugate, Sr.
- Publishers: Game Designers' Workshop
- Publication: 1986; 39 years ago
- Genres: Science fiction
- Systems: Classic Traveller

Traveller Book 8: Robots is a supplement published by Game Designers' Workshop (GDW) in 1986 for the science fiction role-playing game Traveller.

== Contents ==
This book explains how self-aware robots can be designed and used both as player characters and as non-player characters for Traveller. The books gives details of the history of robots, types of robots, who builds them, the robot brain, a universal description system, new character skills for robots, and how to design a robot.

== Publication history ==
GDW first published the science fiction role-playing game Traveller in 1977, and followed that with dozens of supplements and adventures, including Traveller Book 8: Robots in 1986, a 56-page digest-sized softcover book written by Joe D. Fugate, Sr., with illustrations by Steve Venters.

== Reception ==
Marcus L. Rowland reviewed Traveller Alien Module 8: Robots for White Dwarf #85, and stated that "The rules are clear and reasonably concise, and suggest a few interesting scenario ideas. At 56 pages this isn't the most useful rules supplement for a Traveller campaign, it's more for completists and GMs."

== See also ==
Classic Traveller Books
