= Infantry Weapons of the World =

Tabletop role-playing game supplement

- Publishers: Game Designers' Workshop
- Publication: 1990; 36 years ago
- Genres: Post apocalyptic military
- Systems: percentile

Infantry Weapons of the World is a 1990 role-playing supplement for Twilight: 2000 published by Game Designers' Workshop.

== Contents ==
Infantry Weapons of the World is a supplement in which more than 200 firearms are detailed.

== Reception ==
Allen Mixson reviewed Infantry Weapons of the World in White Wolf #30 (Feb., 1992), rating it a 4 out of 5 and stated that "All in all, the book does a good job as a reference of the usual and unusual guns your character can find, and adds a lot of flavor to what weapon choices are available. Regardless of your game, I recommend the book."

== Reviews ==
- Terra Traveller Times (Number 34 - May 1991)
- Voyages to the Worlds of SF Gaming (Issue 15 - 1991)
