= GURPS Traveller: Interstellar Wars =

Tabletop role-playing game

GURPS Traveller
Interstellar Wars
- Designers: Jon F. Zeigler; Loren Wiseman; Paul Drye
- Publishers: Steve Jackson Games
- Publication: 2006; 20 years ago
- Genres: Science fiction
- Systems: GURPS

GURPS Traveller: Interstellar Wars is the first fourth edition book in the GURPS Traveller role-playing game series, by Steve Jackson Games, set early in the history of the Traveller universe.

== Setting ==
The transition between the First Imperium, governed by the Vilani, and the Rule of Man, led by the Terran Confederation, has always been a pivotal era in Marc Miller's Traveller universe. Although the strategic boardgame Imperium (which predates Traveller) was set in the same era, this is the first supplement for any of Traveller's RPG incarnations which concentrates on this time period. GURPS Traveller: Interstellar Wars covers the 200 years of war, peace, and overwhelming change as the ancient Vilani Imperium falls to the upstart Terrans. This time of conflict presents many opportunities for adventure: forging new trade routes within the Imperium, defending the homeworld from invaders during the Siege of Terra, making first contact with alien races, and helping guide the Terran Confederation in its expansion from a single planet to a sector-spanning empire.

== Overview ==
Interstellar Wars includes an overview of the Interstellar wars era, along with a large amount of background on the Terran Confederation, the Vilani Imperium, and the alien races likely to be encountered near Terra. The default year of the setting is 2170 A.D., in the "empty peace" between the Third and Fourth Interstellar Wars, but enough material is provided to set a campaign at any point between First Contact between the Terrans and Vilani and the defeat of the First Imperium. Much of the book is tailored towards a Terran-centered campaign.

Rules for generating characters for the setting, starship design, interstellar trade, exploration, and ship-to-ship combat, all updated for the fourth edition of GURPS, are provided. A main-world generation system is included which is not as detailed as the GURPS Traveller: First In system, but which is geared specifically towards the time period of the Interstellar Wars. A large map of "Known Space" shows the nine subsectors immediately surrounding Terra, which are detailed in the book. The subsector maps, and information for each world are also included. Detailed statistics are present for 26 starships, and deckplans for the Crockett class picket ship, the Heroic Person class far-trader, Lightning class frontier merchant, and the Gashidda class Imperial patrol cruiser are included.

Although the book includes updated versions of the starship design and combat rules found in earlier GURPS: Traveller books, it does not include any rules for converting characters, vehicles, or other rules systems directly into the 4th edition. Noticeably absent are any statistics for weapons, with the quote; "The lists of melee and ranged weapons found in the Basic Set are adequate for the Interstellar Wars setting" being the bulk of the book's treatment of them. The Technology chapter is somewhat brief, with most items gleaned from earlier editions of GURPS: Traveller.

== Publication history ==
GURPS Traveller: Interstellar Wars was published in 2006, a new core book for fourth edition for one of the science-fiction lines of Steve Jackson Games. It was designed by Jon F. Zeigler, Loren Wiseman, and Paul Drye.

== See also ==
- GURPS Traveller books
- List of GURPS books
