= The Shadow Elves =

Tabletop role-playing game supplement for Dungeons & Dragons

- Authors: Carl Sargent and Gary Thomas
- Genre: Role-playing game
- Publisher: TSR
- Publication date: 1990

The Shadow Elves is an accessory for the Dungeons & Dragons fantasy role-playing game.

== Contents ==
The Shadow Elves gazetteer which describes the underground region where the shadow elves live.

== Publication history ==
GAZ13 The Shadow Elves was written by Carl Sargent and Gary Thomas, with a cover by Clyde Caldwell, and was published by TSR in 1990 as a 64-page booklet and a 32-page booklet, with a large color map and an outer folder. Later printings merged the two Guides into one 96-page booklet; although they did not repaginate the new booklet.

== Reviews ==
- GamesMaster International (Issue 4 - Nov 1990)
- Games Review (Volume 2, Issue 10 - Jul 1990)
