= Hard Times (Traveller) =

Tabletop science fiction role-playing game supplement

MegaTraveller
Hard Times
- Cover by Dave Dorman
- Designers: Charles E. Gannon
- Publishers: Game Designers' Workshop
- Publication: 1991; 35 years ago
- Genres: Science fiction
- Systems: 2D6 based task system
- ISBN: 978-1558780859

Hard Times is a supplement published by Game Designers' Workshop (GDW) in 1991 for the science fiction role-playing game MegaTraveller.

== Contents ==
Hard Times moves the Traveller universe forward into a time where the galaxy is riven by economic stagnation and collapse of the empire. Rick Swan wrote, "Planets are gasping for life like guppies flung from a fish bowl, and the luckless survivors face a future of staggering adversity."

The book is divided into two main sections:

- An introduction, where gamemasters are advised what adjustments they should make to their MegaTraveller campaigns. This section also includes tables about damage to planetary biospheres, changes to tech levels, and new maps of the Shattered Imperium.
- Most of the book is taken up by a ten-adventure campaign, with each adventure covering one step in the decline and fall of the now-defunct Imperium:
1. Destruction of interstellar transport
2. Collapse of financial markets
3. Economic recession
4. Corporate reconfiguration
5. Raiders and pirates
6. Isolationism
7. Retooling hardware
8. Dooomed worlds
9. The Imperium fails
10. The darkness begins

== Publication history ==
GDW originally published Traveller, one of the first science fiction role-playing games, in 1977. By the late 1980s, despite a number of new editions including MegaTraveller, sales of the once-popular game had fallen off. In the 2014 book Designers & Dragons: The '70s, game historian Shannon Appelcline explained the steps GDW took to try to regenerate interest: "Dave Nilsen, one of GDW's new hires, headed the final attempts to correct MegaTraveller's problems. He began work with Hard Times (1991), a MegaTraveller book by Charles Gannon that moved the Traveller timeline from the year 1122 to 1128. It was an attempt by GDW to start actually moving MegaTraveller's metaplot, rather than leaving it in stasis. Though some thought it a great supplement because it did something, others thought that it made the once optimistic background of Traveller brutal and hopeless." Appelcline also noted that in preparation for Traveller: The New Era, "GDW did something very surprising: they destroyed the Imperium. A book called Survival Margin (1993) artfully detailed the transition from MegaTraveller through Hard Times into the New Era in prose form."

Hard Times was designed by Charles Gannon, with additional contributions by Terrence McInnes, Tom McCarol, Mark Cunningham, and J. Duncan Law-Green. Interior art was by Thomas Darrel Midgette, Kirk Wescom and Lawrence Williams, and cover art was by David Dorman. The 96-page hardcover book was published by GDW in 1991.

== Reception ==
In the July 1992 edition of Dragon (Issue #183), Rick Swan admired the new direction of the MegaTraveller universe, calling it "a chilling look at the Shattered Imperium in the aftermath of the War of the Rebellion. If the MegaTraveller game heated up the universe of the original Traveller game, Hard Times incinerates it." Swan concluded, "It's fascinating material, masterfully done."

== Reviews ==
- Polyhedron #75

== See also ==
- List of MegaTraveller publications
