= Delta Force Companion =

Delta Force Companion is a 1987 role-playing game supplement published by Task Force Games for Delta Force: America Strikes Back!.

== Contents ==
Delta Force Companion is a supplement in which new mechanics are included covering experience, skill systems, streamlined combat, and rules for large-scale engagements. It also introduces political motivation and intrigue as key themes, encouraging strategic play. Detailed dossiers offer insight into various terrorist organizations, while three short adventure scenarios are included as well.

== Publication history ==
Delta Force Companion was written by William H. Keith Jr. and published by Task Force Games in 1987 as a 96-page book.
