= Traveller Navigator =

Traveller Navigator is a computer program published by Planet III Software for Traveller.

== Contents ==
Traveller Navigator is a program to assist gamemasters running Traveller campaigns, particularly within the Diaspora Sector. This software streamlines the gameplay process by organizing all essential information about travel, combat, and procedural tasks from extensive reference materials into an easily navigable interface powered by a hypertext help engine. The program is divided into several key sections—Charts, Starship Statistics, Starship Operations, Combat, and a glossary—accessible via a Command Pad that allows users to jump between sections regardless of depth. The Charts section features zoomable maps of subsectors, detailed system data, and visual options like jump lanes and color-coded mains. Selecting a star system reveals its Universal Planetary Profile (UPW), including government type, law level, and character suitability, with modifiers and descriptions available. Starship Operations offers 16 procedural guides with step-by-step instructions, for both gamemasters and new players. The Statistics section provides comprehensive specs for various ship types, including crew, armament, speed, and damage tables. Additional features like bookmarks and annotations allow users to mark frequently accessed sections and add campaign notes.

== Publication history ==
Planet III Software were an experienced team of developers in California with a background in Windows applications before they released version 1.1 of Traveller Navigator – Diaspora Sector. Traveller Navigator was designed by Jeff Davies.

== Reception ==
Chris Van Waters reviewed Traveller Navigator for Pyramid magazine and stated that "My hat is off to Planet III Software. Their Traveller Navigator is a helpful and effective tool for running a smooth, well-flowing Traveller campaign. If you play Traveller and have a computer that runs Windows 3.1, then Navigator is for you. Look for me in the Diaspora Sector!"
