= Joe Fugate =

Author and game designer

- Occupation: Publisher

Joe D. Fugate, Sr. is a writer and game designer who has written on model railroading topics and has worked on role-playing games. Fugate is the founder and publisher of Model Railroad Hobbyist magazine (MRH).

== Career ==
Joe D. Fugate, Sr. and Gary Thomas founded the company Digest Group Publications (DGP) in 1986 as a business that they ran part-time while working as editors at other jobs. Fugate wrote articles for the digest-sized magazine The Traveller's Digest that DGP published, and these articles got the attention of Marc Miller from Game Designers' Workshop, who invited Fugate and Thomas to work on expanding and revising their material for GDW; as a result they produced Traveller Book 8: Robots (1986) for Traveller, which began a years-long working relationship between GDW and DGP. Fugate later announced in The MegaTraveller Journal #4 (1993) that DGP would no longer produce material for Traveller, feeling that with GDW they had a "puppet on a string relationship".

Roger Sanger, a fan of Traveller, came to see Fugate at his home one morning in late 1994, hoping to purchase books from Digest Group Publications; Sanger bought some of the remaining backstock at that time, as Fugate needed money to pay back creditors and had been holding onto the boxes of DGP items. Over the next nine months Sanger made an agreement to pay Fugate a few thousand dollars for what assets remained of DGP, as well as their copyrights and trademarks; as part of this agreement Fugate kept the larger debts with himself, while Sanger took care of the smaller debts, so Fugate agreed and Sanger became the owner of DGP.

Fugate later ran a model railroad site, and made how-to videos for the magazine Model Railroader. He produced these videos from 2005-2007.

In July 2008, Joe D. Fugate, Sr. started Model Railroad Hobbyist magazine ISSN 2152-7423 and an associated website to go with the magazine. Model Railroad Hobbyist magazine (MRH) Issue 01 was published January 2009. Model Railroad Hobbyist magazine (MRH) is a digital publication in the same genre as * Model Railroader ISSN 0026-7341 and * Railroad Model Craftsman ISSN 0033-877X

Model Railroad Hobbyist magazine started as a quarterly publication in 2009, went to bimonthly in 2010, and since 2011 has been a monthly publication running over 100 pages per issue. As of 2015, MRH reports that it has about 30,000 subscribers."Advertise with MRH".
