= Castle by the Sea =

- Publishers: Game Designers' Workshop
- Publication: 1992; 34 years ago
- Genres: Post apocalyptic military
- Systems: Twilight: 2000

Castle by the Sea is a 1992 role-playing adventure for Twilight: 2000 published by Game Designers' Workshop.

== Plot summary ==
Castle by the Sea is an adventure in which survivalists in a fortified castle have taken five children from town hostage.

== Reception ==
Allen Mixson reviewed Castle by the Sea in White Wolf #38 (1993), rating it a 4 out of 5 and stated that "Overall, Castle by the Sea is a good module that fits right into any European or Balkan T2K scenario, or (with only slight modifications) into the Merc 2000 game."

== Reviews ==
- Terra Traveller Times (Number 39 - Jul 1992)
