= 1984 Origins Award winners =

The 1984 Origins Award winners were presented at Origins 1985. The awards were presented for the first time in 1975. The purpose of the awards is to recognize excellence in game design, and increase awareness and sales for the nominees, winners, and hobby games in general. During the show, people attending can also play the games that have been nominated.

The following are the winners of the 11th annual (1984) Origins Award:

== Charles Roberts Awards ==
Category	Winner	Company
Best Science Fiction Boardgame of 1984	Web & Starship	West End Games
Best Fantasy Boardgame of 1984	The Lonely Mountain	Iron Crown Enterprises
Best Play-by-Mail Game of 1984	Starweb	Flying Buffalo
Best Professional Roleplaying Magazine of 1984	Dragon	TSR
Best Graphic Presentation of 1984	Vietnam	Victory Games
Best Pre-20th Century Boardgame of 1984	South Mountain	West End Games
Best 20th Century Boardgame of 1984	Vietnam	Victory Games
Best Adventure Game for Home Computer of 1984	Carriers at War	Strategic Studies Group
Best Professional Boardgaming Magazine of 1984	Wargamer	
Best Amateur Adventure Gaming Magazine of 1984	Alarums & Excursions	
Adventure Gaming Hall of Fame	Frank Chadwick	

== The H.G. Wells Awards ==
Category	Winner	Company
Best Historical Figure Series of 1984	25mm Colonials	Ral Partha
Best Fantasy or Science Fiction Figure Series of 1984	25mm Personalities	Ral Partha
Best Vehicular Model Series of 1984	Star Trek Starships	FASA
Best Miniatures Rules of 1984	The Sword and the Flame	Greenfield Hobby
Best Professional Miniatures Magazine of 1984	The Courier	
Best Roleplaying Rules of 1984	Twilight: 2000	GDW
Best Roleplaying Rules of 1984	Paranoia	West End Games
Best Roleplaying Adventure of 1984	Live & Let Die	Victory

== See also ==
- List of board games
- List of board game publishers
- List of game manufacturers
