= NATO Combat Vehicle Handbook =

- Publishers: Game Designers' Workshop
- Publication: 1991; 35 years ago
- Genres: Post apocalyptic military
- Systems: Twilight: 2000

NATO Combat Vehicle Handbook is a 1991 role-playing supplement for Twilight: 2000 published by Game Designers' Workshop.

== Contents ==
NATO Combat Vehicle Handbook is a supplement in which more than 60 vehicles are described.

== Reception ==
Allen Mixson reviewed Nato Combat Vehicle Handbook in White Wolf #30 (Feb., 1992), rating it a 4 out of 5 and stated that "By themselves, the handbooks are a good source. For Twilight gaming support, they are a great set."

== Reviews ==
- Terra Traveller Times (Number 35 - Jul 1991)
