= Desert Sun (Delta Force) =

Desert Sun is a 1987 role-playing game adventure published by Task Force Games for Delta Force: America Strikes Back!.

== Plot summary ==
Desert Sun is an adventure in which operatives are tasked with preventing Libya from developing nuclear weapons. The supplement expands gameplay with desert survival rules, equipment enhancements, and mission suggestions for continued operations in the region.

== Publication history ==
Desert Sun was written by William H. Keith Jr. and published by Task Force Games in 1987 as a 56-page book.
