= Eagles (wargame) =

Board wargame

The rulebook with cover art by John Harshman lying on the game map

Eagles, subtitled "Rome on the Rhine Frontier, AD 15", is a board wargame published by Game Designers' Workshop (GDW) in 1974 that simulates the Roman campaign across the Rhine into Germania led by Germanicus. In the game, the Romans are attempting to recover three Eagles — the honor-laden standard of a Roman legion — from Germanic tribes.

== Background ==
At the Battle of the Teutoburg Forest in 9 CE, German tribes led by Arminius ambushed several Roman legions and captured their Eagles. In 15 CE, Germanicus led a Roman army across the Rhine in an attempt to recover the three lost Eagles.

== Description ==
Eagles is a two-player board wargame in which one player controls Roman forces seeking the captured Eagles, and one player controls the German tribes in possession of the Eagles. At the start of the game, the Eagles rest in three tribal temples. The Roman player moves eight powerful legions across the Rhine, and the German player uses Arminius to rouse various German tribes into action. While some German tribes can intervene to try to slow the Roman legions down, others can go to the temples and take the Eagles with them into the forest. From that point, the Romans attempt to corner the fleeing tribes in the various areas of the forest.

== Publication history ==
In 1974, Loren Wiseman designed Eagles, which was published by GDW in 1974 with artwork by John Harshman. The following year, Avalon Hill acquired the rights to Eagles and Don Greenwood revised the game significantly, changing the combat system and expanding the game to include four more campaigns, resulting in the retitled game Caesar's Legions.

== Reception ==
Richard Berg called Eagles "an interesting failure" that "has no playability to speak of." Berg chiefly objected to the game mechanics that allowed the German chieftains to avoid combat by hiding in the forest; if discovered by the Romans, they could simply flee to a different part of the forest. Berg did admit that the production values of the game were "heads above most" with "excellent clear graphics and well made counters [...] signs of the care and preparation put into this game." But he concluded with a thumbs down, saying, "Eagles is less of an eagle and more of a turkey."

In Issue 2 of Perfidious Albion, Charles Vasey, Geoff Barnard and Steve Clifford traded comments about the game. Vasey noted, "I thought this game had little Ancient feel about it, units were not handled as they should have been, and the whole game lacked real purpose." Barnard replied, "What it lacks is any incentive for the German player to behave like a real Barbarian chieftain ... The usual manner of his winning is to scarper with the Eagles to a distant part of the board where the Romans cannot get at him." Clifford admitted, "True, speaking as one who has played both sides, it is much more challenging to play the Romans. The German should normally win unless he makes a mess, or is unlucky." Vasey also noted, "The actual campaign may have been boring, but the method of play was far worse ... As a picture of Ancient Warfare it was a complete no-no."

In the October 1976 issue of Airfix Magazine, Bruce Quarrie noted the relatively high price of the game (£4.25 in the UK), but called Eagles "an unusual game in that the objective is something specific rather than a simple matter of knocking hell out of your opponent." He concluded that the game "will probably appeal to 'ancient' enthusiasts seeking a change, even at this rather high price."

== Other reviews and commentary ==
- Perfidious Albion #92 and #93
- Panzerfaust #69
