= Digest Group Publications =

Role playing game company

- Industry: Tabletop role-playing games
- Founded: 1986; 39 years ago in Woodburn, Oregon, US
- Founders: Gary L. Thomas; Joe D. Fugate, Sr.
- Owner: Roger Sanger

Digest Group Publications was an American game company that produced role-playing games and game supplements.

== History ==
Editors Gary L. Thomas and Joe D. Fugate, Sr. founded Digest Group Publications (DGP) in 1986 as a business that they ran part-time while working at other jobs. Marc W. Miller wrote a letter to DGP in 1987, asking them to help him make Traveller material more accessible. MegaTraveller (1987–1992), often shortened to MT, was published by GDW but designed by DGP which published the popular Traveller's Digest (later the MegaTraveller Journal) Traveller support magazine. The game system used revised versions of the Classic Traveller mechanics with ideas first developed in the Traveller's Digest (and later also adapted to Traveller: 2300). DGP's final publication, The MegaTraveller Journal #4 (1993), featured a huge campaign for MegaTraveller set in the Gateway sector, authored by William H. Keith Jr.

Roger Sanger came to Fugate's door one morning late in 1994, looking to buy books from DGP; Sanger bought some of the remaining backstock at that time, as Fugate was still paying back creditors and holding onto the boxes of remaining DGP items that he owned. Over the next nine months Sanger came to an agreement whereby he paid Fugate a few thousand dollars for the remaining assets of DGP, including copyrights and trademarks; Fugate would keep the larger debts, but Sanger would take care of the smaller debts. Fugate agreed to this arrangement, and Sanger became owner of DGP. Initially Sanger wanted to republish DGP material and support the fourth edition of Traveller (1996), published by Imperial Games, but Sanger was unable to come up with an agreement with Marc Miller.

== See also ==
- List of Digest Group MegaTraveller publications
