= The Free City of Krakow =

1985 post-apocalyptic military tabletop role-playing game adventure

- Cover by Steve Venters
- Designers: William H. Keith Jr.
- Publishers: Game Designers' Workshop
- Publication: 1985
- Genres: Post-apocalyptic military
- Systems: Twilight: 2000
- ISBN: 978-0943580517

The Free City of Krakow is a 1985 post-apocalyptic military tabletop role-playing game adventure for Twilight: 2000 published by Game Designers' Workshop (GDW).

== Plot summary ==
The Free City of Krakow is the first adventure module for Twilight: 2000, in which the player characters encounter the survivors of a US Special Forces Team after they were ambushed. The Free City of Krakow is a campaign setting supplement focused on the neutral city of Kraków and its significant characters and locations, and comes with maps, brief scenarios, and new rules for using helicopters.

== Publication history ==
The Free City of Krakow was written by William H. Keith Jr., with art by Steve Venters and Liz Danforth, and published in 1985 as a 48-page book by Game Designers' Workshop.

== Reception ==
Timothy Tow reviewed The Free City of Krakow in Space Gamer No. 76. Tow commented that "Overall, The Free City of Krakow is a very good module, up to the normal high GDW standards, but it will take some work from the referee to preplan the adventure (e.g., no NPC characteristics are given). If you want an excellent setting for a Twilight: 2000 campaign, then pick up a copy."

Chris Felton reviewed Free City of Krakow in Imagine magazine, stating that "if you are a GM who can run this sort of adventure well, this is an excellent module for a very good game system".

Frederick Paul Kiesche III reviewed The Free City of Krakow for Different Worlds magazine and stated that "I recommend this module highly. If you run Twilight: 2000, the module is a must - careful use of the city's adventuring resources could bring hours of playing excitement. If you don't run Twilight: 2000, some work may be needed, but I think the adventure could be used in other post-holocaust games; certainly it can be used as an example of good plotting and thought."

In a retrospective review of The Free City of Krakow in Black Gate, Patrick Kanouse said "The Free City of Krakow is a fantastic supplement that provides a GM tons of info, excellent guidance and hooks but never mandates a singular path. The sandbox remains, and now the GM has more toys to create interesting encounters and adventures based on what the players do."

== Reviews ==
- Game News #10 (Dec., 1985)
