= Cadillacs and Dinosaurs (role-playing game) =

1990 tabletop role-playing game

Cadillacs and Dinosaurs: The Roleplaying Game
Thrilling Adventures In A World Gone Mad!
- Designers: Frank Chadwick
- Publishers: Game Designers' Workshop
- Publication: 1990; 36 years ago
- Genres: near-future post-apocalyptic
- Systems: Twilight: 2000 (2nd edition)

Cadillacs and Dinosaurs: The Roleplaying Game is a near-future post-apocalyptic role-playing game published by Game Designers' Workshop in 1990 that is based on the underground comic book Xenozoic Tales.

== Gameplay ==
The game uses the second edition Twilight: 2000 rules. Players create a character defined by six attributes: Strength, Agility, Constitution, Charisma, Intelligence and Education. The character's skills, each ranging from 1–10, are derived from the ability scores. To use a skill, a player must roll a 10-sided die under the character's applicable skill score.

== Plot ==
The game is set 450 years in the future, in the post-apocalyptic world of Mark Schultz's underground comic book series Xenozoic Tales (ISBN 1-55878-073-4) when creatures from every era of history roam the Earth. Players take the roles of humans trying to survive against sabre-tooth tigers, dinosaurs and other creatures from the distant past.

A sample adventure, "The Known World", is included.

== Release ==
=== Publication history ===
Mark Schultz published the first issue of the post-apocalyptic comic Xenozoic Tales in 1986. Although the series only lasted fourteen issues, it spawned an arcade game, a Sega videogame, some toys, an animated series, a music album, and this role-playing game (RPG).

The 144-page soft-cover book for the RPG was written by Frank Chadwick using the rules from another GDW post-apocalypse RPG, Twilight 2000, with artwork by Mark Schultz, Steve Bryant, Steve Stiles, and Kirk Wescom.

== Reception ==
In the September 1992 edition of Dragon (Issue 185), Rick Swan liked the simple and easy, laid-back approach of most of the rules. He was therefore surprised at the complexity of the combat rules, calling them "gratingly out of synch with the user-friendly approach of the rest of the game." Swan used calculating damage from a demolition charge as an example: "You divide the Damage Point value by two, take the square root of the results, and multiply it by 5. Square root? What’s a square root doing in a game with rampaging dinosaurs?" Swan concluded that most gamers should likely give the game a pass: "[Combat is] too hard by half. Fans of the comic book should get a kick out of the informative sourcebook material and Mark Schultz’s exquisite illustrations. Roleplayers, however, may wonder if a premise this modest is worth all the effort."

Although Walt Williams liked the "wealth of information about the Xenozoic world, plus several helpful tables, maps, and rules for exploring that world.", he thought the included adventure was "rather boring". He also found the complex combat system from the gritty Twilight: 2000 RPG did not match the looser style of Cadillacs and Dinosaurs, saying, "The combat system really defeats the overall pulp tone of the setting. Again, C&D is about two-fisted adventure, gun fights, and facing prehistoric monsters. Combat should be quick and light, allowing players to move from one scene to the other in relatively rapid succession. But the rules system here is unnecessarily complex and, at least when involving automatic weapons, potentially very deadly."
