= Twilight: 2000 =

Post-apocalyptic tabletop role-playing game

Twilight 2000
Roleplaying in the Devastation of World War III
- 2nd edition (1990), cover art by Del Harris
- Designers: Frank Chadwick; Dave Nilsen; Loren K. Wiseman; Lester W. Smith
- Publishers: Game Designers' Workshop; Free League Publishing
- Publication: 1984 (1.0); 1990 (2.0); 1993 (2.2); 2008 (Twilight: 2013); 2021 (4th edition)
- Genres: Post apocalyptic military; alternate history (4th edition)
- Systems: percentile; Year Zero Engine (4th edition)

Twilight: 2000 is a post-apocalyptic military tabletop role-playing game published by Game Designers' Workshop (GDW) in 1984, where players take on the roles of survivors of a World War III limited nuclear war (the Twilight War). The game was updated several times, most recently in 2021 by Free League Publishing.

== Description ==
Twilight 2000 is a role-playing game set in modern-day Europe following a long war that used nuclear, chemical, biological and conventional weapons. Players typically take on the roles of American soldiers whose unit is stranded in Central Europe after military control and civil order has broken down. Critic Jim Bambra called this "military role-playing with a difference. In the absence of adequate supply lines and support, characters fight for survival under adverse conditions. Often they cannot rely on superior firepower to gain their goals; stealth and hit-and-run tactics are required. With no safe place to hide, caution must be exercised constantly. Finding food, shelter, and spare parts for vehicles becomes a prime concern."

=== First edition ===
The game history describes a world war that started as a Sino-Soviet border conflict in 1995 (eleven years in the future when the game was first published), followed by an attempted reunification of East and West Germany while the Soviet Union was distracted. This dragged NATO into the conflict, leading to exchanges of nuclear, chemical and biological weapons. By the middle of 2000, high-level command of military units on both sides has broken down, and armies in the European theater have lost cohesion beyond the platoon unit. These small bands of soldiers must survive on their own. Some integrate with the militias of independent free cities, others turn into mercenaries or gangs of marauding bandits, and some simply seek to find their way home.

The game uses rolls of 10-sided dice to resolve skill challenges and combat. Each character has six basic attributes: Fitness, Agility, Constitution, Stature, Intelligence and Education, which are used to "buy" skills, as well as combat experience, "Coolness Under Fire", Age, Languages Spoken, Rank, and Specialties.

The game also includes the introductory adventure "Escape from Kalisz." The players are soldiers from the U.S. 5th Division (Mechanized) who have been told via radio "You're on your own." Advancing Soviet troops mean the characters will have to find some means of avoiding capture or death.

=== Second edition ===
With the real-world fall of the Berlin Wall in 1989 which made defunct the idea of a German rebellion, GDW released a second edition in 1990 which starts with the same Sino-Russian war, but without the rebellion to reunify Germany, using other events to drag NATO into war.

The game system was changed to the GDW House Rules system, which was also used in Traveller: The New Era, Dark Conspiracy and Cadillacs & Dinosaurs.

Characters are defined by seven attributes and skills rated out of 10: Strength, Constitution, Agility, Intelligence, Education, Charisma, and Empathy. Players then choose skills and a career.

=== Edition 2.2 ===
Real world events continued to outstrip GDW's alternate timeline, as the Soviet Union fell apart in 1991. In response, GDW released Edition 2.2 in 1993. The storyline was changed so that in August 1991, the KGB's Alpha Group obeyed the coup leaders in the Soviet coup attempt and stormed the Russian White House, killing Boris Yeltsin and effectively preserving communist control. The world war then unfolds. This new timeline effectively future-proofed the game, since anything that happened in the real world after August 1991 could be ignored.

This version also converted the rules to d20 System.

== Publication history ==
Twilight: 2000 was created by Frank Chadwick. Dave Nilsen, Loren K. Wiseman, and Lester W. Smith, and published by GDW in 1984. Over 40 supplements for Twilight: 2000 were produced by GDW.

GDW also produced a number of related products.

- In 1986, GDW extended the timeline of Twilight: 2000 to create the background history for the future-world post-apocalyptic game 2300 AD.
- In 1989, GDW released the board wargame Last Battle: Twilight 2000.

=== Second edition ===
GDW published a second edition of Twilight: 2000 in 1990 following the fall of the Berlin Wall. In the same year, trying to move away from the problematic Russian storyline that had been overtaken by real-world events, GDW published Merc 2000, an alternative campaign setting which revolved around mercenaries fighting wars in a timeline in which World War III does not occur. After Merc 2000 was released, many supplements and articles printed in GDW's house magazine Challenge featured either articles about Twilight: 2000 that included equipment and background conversions to Merc 2000; or articles about Merc 2000 only.

In 1991, licensee Paragon developed the Twilight 2000 computer game adaptation under license (complete with expansion, "the Colonel") depicting a squad of 20 soldiers stranded behind enemy lines in Poland, struggling against the despot Baron Czarny.

=== Version 2.2 ===
In 1993, GDW published version 2.2 of Twilight 2000, which rewrote the history to conform to deal with events in the Soviet Union by creating an alternate history in which the Soviet Union does not fall apart in 1991.

=== Third edition ===
In 2006, 93 Games Studio announced that they had acquired the license to produce the official Twilight 2000 Version 3.0 where World War III would no longer focus on a Cold War confrontation between NATO, the Soviet Union and China. The game was designed by Clayton Oliver, Simon Pratt, and Keith Taylor, with contributions by Gary Astleford, Josh Benton, Andy Davis, Derek Klein, Max Messina, Andy Miller, Martin Ralya, Tatu Salonen, and Justin Stodola, cover art by Tyler Windham, and interior art by Andrew Dobell, Diego Gisbert, Scott Harshbarger, Rick Hersey, Johan Lindstrom, Art Lyon, Chris Martinez, Bradley McDevitt, Jesse Mohn, Matt Morrow, Clifford Morton, Jason Mullins, Miguel Santos, Filip Stojak, Keith Taylor, Kurt Taylor, Norm Scott, Jeff Ward, Richard Whyte, Tianyang Yan and Brandon Young. It used the Reflex System, and was released in 2008 released with the title Twilight: 2013 both as a PDF and as a print edition. The game failed to find an audience, and in December 2010, 93 Games Studio announced it was going out of business.

=== Other editions and supplements ===
In 2017 and 2018, three new modules for Twilight: 2000 were released online: a source book for East Africa/Kenya, a new standalone adventure played during the same time as the "Going Home" module and a Korean source book.

In 2020, Free League Publishing announced they had received a license to publish a new edition of the Twilight: 2000 setting. The game has a new ruleset based on the Year Zero Engine, and background where the Soviet Union survives the fall of the Berlin Wall and battle in central Europe is joined in 1998. It was released in November 2021 under the name Twilight: 2000 – Roleplaying in the World War III That Never Was. It featured two settings: Poland and Sweden.

The first expansion to the game, Urban Operations, included rules for play in urban environments and is loosely based on the classic module Free City of Krakow from the first edition of Twilight: 2000.

== Reception ==
=== First edition ===
In Issue 74 of Space Gamer, Rick Swan and Greg Porter discussed this game. Swan commented, "Whether or not Twilight: 2000 becomes a standard remains to be seen, but it certainly fills a niche and does so successfully; I hope it finds an audience with role-players and wargamers alike. As a design, it's nothing spectacular, but as a concept, it's an innovation." Porter was considerably more pessimistic, writing, "All told, Twilight: 2000 is a tragic waste of [money]. The nice concept and character generation system are completely overrun by innumerable flaws and hopeless violations of the laws of physics."

In Issue 27 of the British RPG magazine Imagine Chris Felton stated "Overall, this is a good game, well worth clubbing together for if you belong to a group of experienced players who like free-running games and whose referee can run a scenario from minimal notes. If your referee has no experience of 'winging it' and needs all the details worked out in advance, this is not the game for you."

In Issue 40 of Different Worlds, Stephen M. DeSante commented, "All things considered, Twilight: 2000 is worth buying for its combat system alone. Anyone expecting a fully developed post-holocaust world, however, will be disappointed with what GDW supplies. They may do better if they consider the game more as a supplement to an ongoing campaign than as a game in and of itself."

In Issue 68 of the British RPG magazine White Dwarf, Marcus L. Rowland noted "The physical contents of the box are well designed and presented" and called the game system "moderately complex." However, Rowland found "While the system is playable, the moral stance and attitudes it exemplifies are fairly loathsome ... Starvation and plague are occasionally mentioned, with the implication that characters can always use their weapons to get food and medicines." Rowland also disagreed with the attitude that "Europe evidently is not worth anyone's time or effort. The rules never say anything about the possibility of rebuilding settlements, negotiating local peace treaties, or doing anything else to start civilisation working again." Rowland concluded by giving the game a rating of only 5 out of 10, writing, "it's evident that this game has been written by and for Americans, with little or no understanding of European attitudes or desires."

In Issue 3 of Adventurer, Mike Willis commented "Twilight 2000 is really a role-playing war game, and should appeal to fantasy gamers looking for something different. I would also recommend it to wargamers who feel that fantasy games are a little unrealistic for their tastes."

In the October 1985 issue of Analog Science Fiction, Dana Lombardy commented, "Despite Twilight: 2000's somber theme, the game plays well and requires the characters to use their wits for survival in a realistically drawn post-nuclear exchange world." Lombardy found the books in the game box well-written, pointing out "The Player's Manual, in particular, is filled with narrative examples to illustrate the rules. These are exceptionally well written for a game manual. reading more like excerpts from a good war novel." Lombardy concluded, "Twilight: 2000 is for those gamers who like 'what if' scenarios of the near future. It's detailed, innovative, and thought provoking. It's everything a role-playing game should be."

In Issue 105 of Polyhedron, Errol Farstad called this game "a different type of role-playing game which combines the elements of modern-day warfare with role-playing, and docs a pretty darn good job at it." Farstad warned, "The rules are set down in plain language and they are easy to understand. But, like some of the more complex games, it takes a bit longer to learn than the basic roleplaying games." Farstad also had issues with some of the tables, pointing out, "while the Referee’s Charts give the details on the weapons and assign numbers for damage, the tables do not specify what the numbers stand for." Farstad concluded by giving the game a rating of 3 out o5, saying, "The concept is good. The game itself, with the exception of the point noted above, is excellent and can provide many hours of enjoyable role-playing."

In Issue 26 of the French games magazine Casus Belli, Pierre Rosenthal noted "it's well-designed and quite comprehensive. All types of combat are covered. We learn about the effects of illnesses and diseases. How to hunt, fish, and scavenge for supplies. How to improve your combat techniques and learn new ones ... So, what's wrong with it? It's simple: we don't really like playing Twilight. What we would enjoy in a role-playing game is creating a character with a purpose in life other than simply surviving until tomorrow." Rosenthal concluded, "Twilight 2000 lacks that magic that makes you want to play. In the end, all you're left with is a piece of paper listing your weapons."

In the March 1986 issue of Games, Burt Hochberg called it, "extremely well designed and, for all its complexity, not difficult to play ... The possibilities are almost limitless. The members of your squad could decide, depending on circumstances, to continue fighting a guerrilla war, to become marauders whose only goal is survival, or to seek out a 'free city,' independent of any country, where food, weapons, or simply time for rest and recuperation may be found."

In Issue 38 of Abyss, Dave Nalle liked the "real feeling of mood" in the rulebooks, saying, "These draw the player right into the rather harsh world of Europe after a third world war and make you identify with the stranded soldiers trying to fight their way out of Poland." But Nalle found the Player Book "just too damn sketchy ... not giving enough information on skills and abilities." Nalle also found failings in the combat system, pointing out "It gives a great feeling for some of the tactics of modern combat, but characters aren't really threatened a great deal, and whether they live or die is really more or less a function of chance." Nalle also questioned the replayability of the game, noting, "there is no way you can play an extended campaign in a world which is this limited and depressing ... Twilight 2000 can never really be more than a throwaway game, the kind you play a few times for a change before going back to something with more durable qualities."

The Games Machine thought it was "Not a game to return to week after week maybe, but for a complete change of style it's well worth a play."

In Issue 152 of Dragon, Jim Bambra noted "Instead of war on a large scale, this situation is one of small-scale skirmishes where, with dwindling supplies of ammunition, every bullet counts." Bambra liked the character creations rules, commenting, "[It] produces well-rounded soldiers using random determination with built-in checks and balances to avoid unplayable characters. There are opportunities for players to affect the outcome of some of the dice rolls, making it more than just an exercise in rolling dice." Bambra found the combat rules "fast and effective" but found mechanized combat "produces realistic results, but it can be time consuming." Bambra was ambivalent about the included introductory adventure, pointing out, "the adventure is really nothing more than an outline to aid the GM in designing suitable encounters for the PCs. With no developed non-player characters or individual encounters described, it's pretty directionless and places great emphasis on a GM's ability to improvise." Bambra concluded "it is well worth a look by anyone interested in military or survivalist role-playing. Its systems work well, and it bridges the gap between war games and role-playing in a very satisfactory manner. The emphasis on the breakdown of society and industrial production keeps the conflicts at a small scale and keeps characters motivated."

James Davis Nicoll in 2020 for Black Gate said "T2000 avoided Chadwickification — the tendency of any RPG Frank Chadwick had a hand in to slowly become a military RPG — by being one right from the get-to. It was pretty well supported by GDW. New editions appeared as various key elements of their future history were superseded."

In a retrospective review of Twilight: 2000 in Black Gate, Patrick Kanouse said "In Twilight: 2000, the characters can forge their own future, and to me, that is the magic of the game — its promise of hope in a gritty, dangerous, breaking and broken world."

=== Second edition ===
In Issue 24 of White Wolf, Allen Mixson compared it to Twilight Encounters and stated that "since you get the same and even more in the second edition, spend your money on this product. The little bit more you pay for the second Edition is money well spent." Mixson concluded by giving the game a rating of 4 out o 5, saying, "For those who are into Twilight 2000, this is a must have."

In his 1990 book The Complete Guide to Role-Playing Games, Rick Swan called the second edition "a rare example of a game that's satisfying for both role-players and tactical wargamers." Swan thought the character generation system was "the game's weakest feature ... the procedure takes forever, involving innumerable modifiers and convoluted formulas." But he found the combat system "exceptionally clean ... a nice balance between realism and playability." Swan concluded by giving the game a solid rating of 3 out of 4, saying, "Twilight:2000 is easily the best of the postapocalyptic RPGs."

=== Version 2.2 ===
In a 1996 readers poll conducted by the British games magazine Arcane to determine the top 50 role-playing games, Twilight 2000 was ranked 35th. Editor Paul Pettengale commented, "Pretty much all the previous 'post-apocalyptic' RPGs had been fairly fantastical, and had been set some time after the apocalypse. Twilight: 2000 is realistic and set in the middle of the breakdown of European society. Involving, but not exactly cheerful."

== Awards ==
At Origins 1985, Twilight 2000 was awarded the H.G. Wells Award for "Best Roleplaying Rules of 1984".

== Supplements ==
GDW produced over 40 supplements for Twilight: 2000 including:

- The Black Madonna, 1985
- The Free City of Krakow, 1985
- Pirates of the Vistula, 1985
- The Ruins of Warsaw, 1985
- Armies of the Night, 1986
- Going Home, 1986
- RDF Sourcebook, 1986
- Red Star, Lone Star, 1986
- US Army Vehicle Guide, 1986
- Airlords of the Ozarks, 1987
- Allegheny Uprising, 1987
- Gateway to the Spanish Main, 1987
- King's Ransom, 1987
- Soviet Army Vehicle Guide, 1987
- Howling Wilderness, 1988
- Kidnapped, 1988
- The Last Submarine, 1988
- Mediterranean Cruise, 1988
- Satellite Down, 1988
- Small Arms Guide, 1988
- Urban Guerilla, 1988
- The Bear's Den, 1989
- Boomer, 1989
- Heavy Weapons Guide, 1989
- Return to Warsaw, 1989
- American Combat Vehicle Handbook, 1990
- Infantry Weapons of the World, 1990
- NATO Vehicle Guide, 1990
- Soviet Combat Vehicle Handbook, 1991
- Survivors' Guide to the United Kingdom, 1990
- Twilight Encounters, 1990
- White Eagle, 1990
- Bangkok Cesspool of the Orient, 1991
- NATO Combat Vehicle Handbook, 1991
- Castle by the Sea, 1993
- Special Operations, 1993

Additionally, 3W produced one supplement:

- City of Angels, 1989

== See also ==
- Twilight: 2000 at BoardGameGeek
- List of stories set in a future now in the past
