= Ley Sector =

Science-fiction role-playing game supplement

Ley Sector is a supplement published under license by Judges Guild in 1980 for Game Designers' Workshop's science fiction role-playing game Traveller.

== Contents ==
Ley Sector is a supplement which details 16 new subsectors and 411 new planets located on the outer fringe of the Imperium in an area not covered by material published by Game Designers Workshop (GDW). The book contains a large double-sided folded colour map that also serves as the book's cover. In addition to information about star systems, the book also includes tables of various types of encounters, including space encounters, ships, urban encounters, planetary encounters, animal encounters, as well as rumors.

== Publication history ==
Traveller was first published by GDW in 1977. Although Judges Guild had only produced material for TSR's Dungeons & Dragons, in 1979, they started to publish licensed Traveller material, producing over 20 publications by 1982. To accompany their Traveller adventures and provide more detail for the setting, Design Manager Dave Sering published four different supplements that gave background to a large section of space that Judges Guild called the Gateway Quadrant, running from Ley Sector (1980) to Maranantha-Alkahest Sector (1981).

Ley Sector, released in 1980, was a 32-page book with a large three-color map written and illustrated by Ken Simpson.

Judges Guild stopped producing material for Traveller in 1982. The Atlas of the Imperium, published by GDW in 1984, overwrote the area previously covered by Judges Guild material with new star systems and information, rendering all Judges Guild material as non-canonical.

== Reception ==
Ley Sector received mixed reviews.

In the February 1981 edition of The Space Gamer (Issue No. 36), William A. Barton recommended the supplement, saying, "Ley Sector should add to the fun and enjoyment of anyone's Traveller campaign. I recommend it to all travellers seeking new worlds to conquer."

In the July 1981 edition of Dragon (Issue #51), Tony Watson didn't like the fact that planet names were not printed on the map, but had to be looked up by referencing the proper subsector found in the guide book. He also found it "a bit more vexing... that the hexes are numbered in continuous sequence rather than as a series of eight-by-ten rectangles denoting subsectors... it’s a bit difficult to determine exactly what subsector is involved." Watson gave a lukewarm recommendation: "Those referees who have already fully developed their own subsectors might find the new encounter tables and events listing to be useful."

In the December/January 1982 edition of White Dwarf (Issue #28), Trevor Graver also noted the names of planets were missing from the map and required reference to the guidebook. Although he found fewer typographical errors than in previous Judges Guild offerings, the encounter tables were "rather bland". He concluded that "Ley Sector is useful to those people wishing to expand the knowne Imperium, but the standard of Judges Guild has dropped despite less typos."
