= Traveller: The New Era =

Tabletop science fiction role-playing game

- Publishers: Game Designers' Workshop
- Publication: 1993; 33 years ago
- Genres: Science fiction
- Systems: GDW House System

Traveller: The New Era is a 1993 role-playing supplement for Traveller published by Game Designers' Workshop.

== Contents ==
Traveller: The New Era is a supplement in which the rules for the third edition of Traveller are presented.

== Publication history ==
Shannon Appelcline wrote of the many changes from the previous edition of Traveller: "Traveller: The New Era (TNE) was rewritten to use the GDW House System. Some old systems such as the unique term-based character creation still existed but everything was notably revamped. The result felt more militaristic and more complex than its predecessors, not a surprising result given the system's ultimate origin in Twilight: 2000."

== Reception ==
Chris W. McCubbin reviewed Traveller: The New Era for Pyramid #2 (July/Aug. 1993) and concluded that, despite some complaints he had about the new version, "Traveller's still around and that's good. I hope it always will be."

Brennan O'Brien reviewed Traveller: The New Era in White Wolf #37 (July/Aug., 1993), rating it a 4 out of 5 and stated that "Traveller: The New Era is outstanding. It's nice to see GDW put Traveller back on the front burner."

Traveller: The New Era won the 1993 Origins Award for Best Roleplaying Rules.

== Reviews ==
- Dragon #203
- Australian Realms #13
- The Last Province (Issue 5 - Aug / Sept 1993)
- Windgeflüster (Issue 26 - Jun 1994)
- Casus Belli #76

== See also ==
- Fire, Fusion & Steel - TNE vehicle construction rules
- Survival Margin: Gateway to the New Era - bridging supplement between the Megatraveller and TNE editions
- Brilliant Lances - TNE starship combat rules
- Striker II - TNE miniatures rules
- List of other TNE supplements
