= Merc: 2000 =

Merc: 2000 is an alternative setting for the Twilight: 2000 role playing game by Game Designers' Workshop. Whereas Twilight: 2000 was set in the immediate post-World War III era, with characters representing soldiers trying to survive, characters in Merc: 2000 are mercenaries working for or against government forces in the 1990s, mainly in Third World countries all over the world.

Rules-wise, Merc: 2000 must be used with Twilight: 2000 versions 2.0 through 2.2; the earlier first-edition Twilight: 2000 rules differ too much to be easily usable without extensive adaptation. The Merc: 2000 rulebook details the game world, gives additional rules and equipment that will be more useful in mercenary campaigns than in normal Twilight: 2000 ones, and also supplies some basic adventures to play. Game Designers' Workshop also published a number of separate adventures for use with Merc: 2000.

== Reception ==
Allen Mixson reviewed Merc: 2000 in White Wolf #30 (February 1992), rating it a 4 out of 5 and stated that "If you want a slightly futuristic game setting or a perspective on what the world could have been if nuclear war hadn't started, this book is just for you. I highly recommend it."

== Reviews ==
- Terra Traveller Times (Number 33: March 1991)
- Voyages to the Worlds of SF Gaming (Issue 15 – 1991)
- Polyhedron #70
- Polyhedron #75
