= Loren Wiseman =

American role-playing game designer

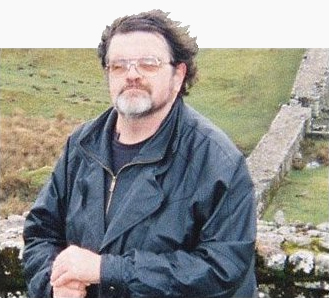
- Loren Wiseman
- Born: March 7, 1951; Bloomington, Illinois, U.S.
- Died: February 14, 2017 (aged 65); Austin, Texas, U.S.
- Resting place: Randolph Township Cemetery (Heyworth, Illinois)
- Occupations: Wargame and role-playing game designer, game developer, editor
- Years active: 44
- Known for: Journal of the Traveller' Aid Society, Twilight: 2000, GURPS Traveller

Loren Keith Wiseman (March 7, 1951 – February 14, 2017) was an American wargame and role-playing game designer, game developer and editor.

== Career ==
=== Game Designers' Workshop ===
After graduating from Illinois State University, Loren Wiseman co-founded Game Designers' Workshop with Frank Chadwick, Rich Banner, and Marc Miller on June 22, 1973. Wiseman published Eagles (later published by Avalon Hill as Caesar's Legions), his first wargame, and the fifth game published by Game Designers' Workshop, in 1974. As a partner at GDW, his primary responsibilities were game development – editing and revising game manuscripts and preparing them for publication. During this period he designed the wargame Pharsalus (1977), and wrote the award-winning Twilight: 2000 role-playing adventure Going Home.

Wiseman helped Frank Chadwick, John Harshman, and Marc Miller design Traveller (1977). Wiseman was editor of the Journal of the Travellers Aid Society (24 issues), and its successor Challenge magazine (53 issues).

Wiseman brought on J. Andrew Keith and William H. Keith Jr. to GDW to start freelancing in either 1978 or 1979, and author Shannon Appelcline noted that "Together the three would end up setting a lot of the early tone for the Traveller universe.

Wiseman became the line developer for Twilight: 2000. The process at GDW was for the designer to write the text, but the developer brought together that text, plus draft diagrams and art into a manuscript, typeset it, and then made sure it was properly published. It also fell to him to design titles in the series (out of 46 supplementary titles for the series, he is credited with designing 20).

=== Steve Jackson Games ===
When GDW closed in 1995, Wiseman was unemployed for a short time and then worked a succession of part-time jobs, before being offered a job at Steve Jackson Games as Art Director and Traveller Line Editor. Steve Jackson brought on Wiseman to produce the GURPS Traveller (1998) line. He wrote GURPS Traveller and several supporting products, including GURPS Traveller Nobles and The Interstellar Wars.

== Awards and recognition ==
Wiseman was recognized for his excellence and expertise with the H. G. Wells Award for Twilight: 2000 Going Home (1986), and the H. G. Wells Award three years running for the Journal of the Travellers Aid Society (1979-1980-1981). In 2003 Wiseman was Gaming Guest of Honor at the 26th CoastCon science fiction convention. In 2004, Loren received perhaps the highest of honors within the gaming community: he was inducted into the Adventure Gaming Hall of Fame, and the above recounting of his credits gives some insight into the rationale. He was honored as a "famous game designer" by being featured as the king of clubs in Flying Buffalo's 2010 Famous Game Designers Playing Card Deck.

== Death ==
Reports on Facebook and at Steve Jackson Games report that Loren Wiseman died of a heart attack on February 14, 2017.

== Posthumous work ==
Loren had written "The City of Ascalon" for publication as part of the Dangerous Journeys RPG, but work was halted by the settlement GDW made with TSR. Since Loren retained the rights to Ascalon, it could still be published as a standalone generic RPG supplement. He sold the rights to Donald Eccles, who later formed FGG Games, LLC in 2023 to publish Ascalon and other works. Ascalon was finally published on July 10, 2023, six years after Loren's death.
