= Traveller (role-playing game) =

Tabletop science fiction role-playing game

Science-Fiction Adventure in the Far Future
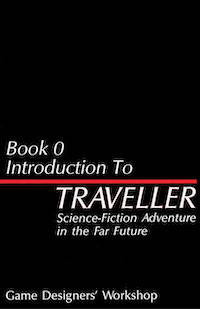
- Traveller Book 0: An Introduction to Traveller (1981) cover
- Designers: Marc Miller; Frank Chadwick; John Harshman; Loren Wiseman
- Publishers: Game Designers' Workshop (1977–1996); Imperium Games (1996–1998); Steve Jackson Games (1998–2015); QuikLink Interactive (2002–2009); ComStar Games (2006–2008); Mongoose Publishing (2008–present); Far Future Enterprises (2013–present)
- Publication: 1977 (original); 1987 (MegaTraveller); 1993 (Traveller: The New Era); 1996 (Marc Miller's Traveller); 1998 (GURPS Traveller); 2002 (Traveller20); 2006 (GURPS Traveller: Interstellar Wars); 2006 (Traveller Hero); 2008 (Traveller known as Mongoose Traveller); 2013 (Traveller5); 2016 (Traveller known as Mongoose Traveller 2nd edition)
- Years active: 1977–present
- Genres: Science fiction; Space opera
- Systems: Custom; GURPS; Hero System; d20 Systems
- Website: www.farfuture.net; www.mongoosepublishing.com

Traveller is a science fiction role-playing game first published in 1977 by Game Designers' Workshop (GDW). Marc Miller designed Traveller with help from Frank Chadwick, John Harshman, and Loren Wiseman. Editions were published for GURPS, d20, and other role-playing game systems. From its origin and in the currently published systems, the game relied upon six-sided dice for random elements. Traveller has been featured in a few novels and at least two video games.

Traveller is a tabletop game where characters journey through star systems, engaging in exploration, ground and space battles, and interstellar trading. The game is influenced by various literary works and emphasizes commerce, sociological stratification, and a mix of low and high technology. The setting is centered around the human-dominated Third Imperium, a feudalistic interstellar empire. Despite the focus on humans, the Traveller universe is cosmopolitan and features various other sophont peoples. The game's history also features the Ancients, a highly advanced race that left behind ruins and artifacts scattered throughout the universe.

Traveller has been published in various editions since 1977. The original version, known as Classic Traveller, was published by GDW. Throughout the years, the game has evolved, with notable editions including MegaTraveller, Traveller: The New Era, Marc Miller's Traveller, GURPS Traveller, Traveller20, Traveller Hero, Mongoose Traveller, and Traveller5. The current rulesets are Traveller5 and Mongoose Traveller 2nd Ed., both of which draw from the original Traveller rules and rely on six-sided dice. Each edition presents different settings, timelines, and mechanics, showcasing the game's adaptability and enduring popularity.

Traveller has received consistently positive reviews across various editions, won multiple Origins Awards, and was inducted into the Origins Hall of Fame in 1996. While the game has faced some criticism, such as slow character growth and anachronistic weapons, it remains a classic in the role-playing hobby. Some video games and software have been based on the Traveller universe, including The Imperial Data Recovery System, MegaTraveller 1: The Zhodani Conspiracy, and MegaTraveller 2: Quest for the Ancients.

== Design ==
Characters typically journey between star systems, engaging in exploration, ground and space battles, and interstellar trading. Characters are defined not by the need to increase native skill and ability but by achievements, discoveries, wealth, and so on.

=== Influences and inspiration ===
Marc Miller has listed works that influenced Traveller and provided its key features:

- Dorsai - Gordon R. Dickson, 1960
- Dumarest of Terra series - E.C. Tubb, 1967–2008
- Envoy to New Worlds - Keith Laumer, 1963
- Hammer's Slammers - David Drake, 1979
- Retief's Peace - William H. Keith (based on the titular character created by Keith Laumer), 2005
- Space Viking - H. Beam Piper, 1963
- The Cosmic Computer - H. Beam Piper, 1963

=== Key features ===
- Commerce: This the major driving force of civilization.
- Human-centric but cosmopolitan: Core rules focus on human player characters and NPCs. There is support for using and playing aliens.
- Limited communication: There is no such things as Faster-than-light communication (ansible, subspace radio, etc.) Communication is limited to the speed of travel (which can be faster than light). Decisions are made on the local level rather than by a remote authority.
- Morals and mortality: People remain people and continue to exhibit human virtues and flaws.
- Sociological: Interstellar society is socially stratified. SOC (Social Status) is a attribute. Affairs are often managed by independent nobility, who make use of established titles such as Baron, Duke and Archduke.

=== Characters ===
Traveller uses a lifepath-style system for character generation. Characters get skills and experience in a mini-game where the player makes career choices determining the character's life up to the point before adventuring begins.

A character can be human, robot, alien, or of a genetically engineered species. A character can be civilian, military, or noble, a young cadet, or a tried-and-true veteran, each with strengths and weaknesses. Death during character generation is possible in some editions, a mechanic that became infamous.

Characters have six primary characteristics, generated by a roll of two six-sided dice. Other characteristics also exist to add nuance to alien characters. PCs may have telepathy, telekinesis and other psychic abilities. These are organized and standardized into "psionics".

=== Equipment ===
Equipment emphasizes wilderness exploration, hazardous environments, and combat. As a result, equipment lists are heavy on vehicles, sensor equipment, communicators, rations, personal armor, and weapons.

Low-technology
Since primitive worlds exist near technological worlds, primitive weapons such as swords, shields, pikes, and bows are included. Characters often have some sort of blade skill for close combat.
High-technology
Cybernetics and non-sentient robots also show up in equipment lists, as do artifacts from ancient civilizations.
Hard Sci-fi Flavor
Along with energy weapons, there is also a strong presence of slug-throwing weapons such as rifles and pistols. The prevailing theory is that (usually) the most efficient way to stop someone is with kinetic energy (e.g. bullets).

=== Starships ===
Starships range from small one-person scouts, to giant planetoid colony ships. Design rules balance power, life support, and defenses for consistent ships. GDW published several board games allowing Traveller space battles to be played out as games in their own right - Mayday, Brilliant Lances and Battle Rider for example.

=== Worlds ===
Worlds range from barren planetoid moons to large gas giant worlds, from uncolonized territories to planets with billions of people. The world generation rules produce a random mix of worlds.

== Setting ==
Early in the adventures and supplements, a default setting emerged, based on in-house play tests done for the game. In this setting, the human-dominated Third Imperium is the largest interstellar empire in charted space, a feudalistic union of worlds, where local nobility operate largely free from oversight and restricted by convention and feudal obligations.

=== Sophonts ===
The setting features descendants of humanity who are collectively called Humaniti. These include the Solomani, humans emigrated from Earth within the last few thousand years, the Vilani, humans transplanted from Earth tens of thousands of years ago by the Ancients (see below) who founded the First Imperium, and the Zhodani, psychic humans ruled by psionically gifted nobles.

Despite the thematic dominance of the human race, with most adventures taking place in human space, the Traveller universe is cosmopolitan and contains many technologically advanced sophonts, a term borrowed from earlier science fiction material. The setting principally concerns itself with six major races that developed faster-than-light travel independently. In addition to Humaniti, the standard list of major races includes the honor-bound catlike Aslan, the winged lizard-like Droyne, the sixfold-symmetric and manipulative Hivers, the centaur-like militant vegetarian K'kree, and the wolf-hybrid Vargr.

Additional minor races are numerous. An early publication from GDW notes that "The minor races, of which there are hundreds within the area of known space, will be largely left up to individual referees." GDW's quarterly publication, the Journal of the Travellers Aid Society designed by Loren K. Wiseman, sketched out about one race per quarter, starting with the Aslan in Issue 7. Taken together with aliens casually mentioned or introduced in separate scenarios or adventures—often arbitrarily—there is therefore no indication that the number of minor races is limited in any sense.

=== Ancients ===
The Ancients were a major race in the distant past; their ruins dot planets throughout charted space and their artifacts are more technically advanced than those of any existing civilization. For unknown reasons, they transplanted humans from Earth to dozens of worlds, uplifted Terran wolves to create the Vargr and transplanted them to another world, and undertook many megascale engineering projects before destroying their civilization in a catastrophic civil war.

== Publishing history ==
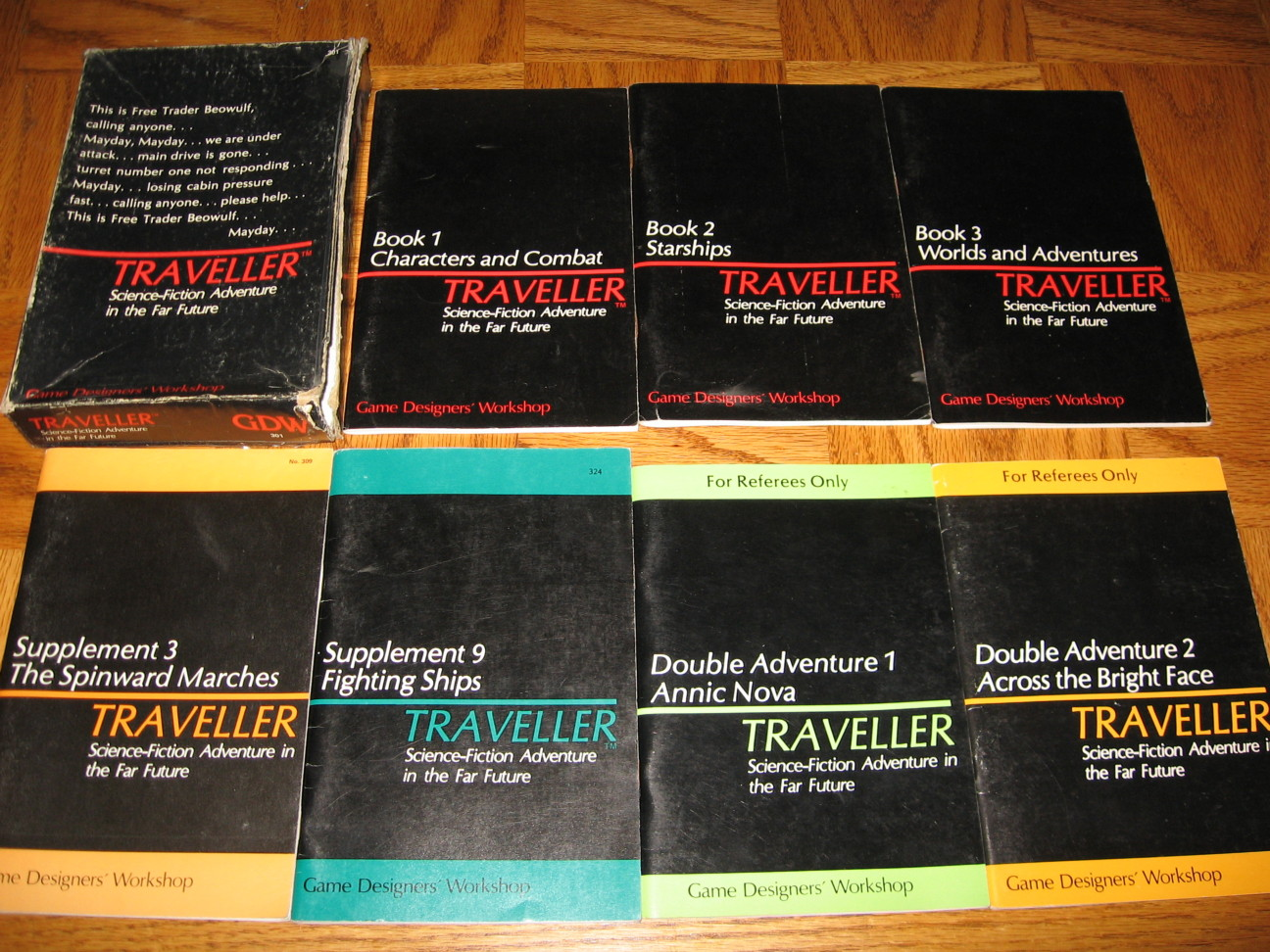
A selection of classic Traveller rule books and supplements, including the core box set.

=== Editions ===
Mongoose Traveller 2nd Ed. and Traveller^{5} are the current rulesets. Both rely on six-sided dice and both draw from the original Traveller rules. Nearly all older versions of Traveller are available in PDF format.

Traveller game editions and publishers
Pub. date	Game	Abbrev.	Primary publisher
1977	(Classic) Traveller	CT	Game Designers' Workshop
1987	MegaTraveller	MT	Game Designers' Workshop
1993	Traveller: The New Era	TNE	Game Designers' Workshop
1996	Marc Miller's Traveller	T4	Imperium Games
1998	GURPS Traveller	GT	Steve Jackson Games
2002	Traveller^{20}	T20	QuikLink Interactive
2006	Traveller Hero	TH	ComStar Games
2006	GURPS Traveller: Interstellar Wars	GTIW	Steve Jackson Games
2008	Mongoose Traveller 1st Ed.	MGT	Mongoose Publishing
2013	Traveller^{5}	T5	Far Future Enterprises
2016	Mongoose Traveller 2nd Ed.	MGT2	Mongoose Publishing
2019	Traveller^{5.10}	T5	Far Future Enterprises
2022	Mongoose Traveller 2nd Ed. Update	MGT2	Mongoose Publishing

==== Traveller ====
The original version was designed and published by GDW in 1977. The core rules originally came as a box set of three black digest-sized books, and were later compiled into a single volume rulebook. This edition is also commonly known by the retronym Classic Traveller.

==== MegaTraveller ====
The game was set during a rebellion which shattered the Imperium. Supplements and magazines produced during this era detailed the progression of the rebellion from the initial assassination of the Emperor in 1116 to the collapse of large-scale interstellar trade in roughly 1124 (the beginning of the supplement Hard Times).

==== Traveller: The New Era ====
Traveller: The New Era is set in the former territory of the Third Imperium after interstellar government and society had largely collapsed. TNE introduced Virus, a silicon-chip life form that infected and took over computers. The game mechanics used GDW's house system, derived from Twilight: 2000, 2nd Ed.

==== Marc Miller's Traveller ====
Commonly called 'T4', this edition is set in the early days of the Third Imperium (Milieu 0), with the small, newly formed empire surrounded by regressed or barbaric worlds.

==== GURPS Traveller ====
Designed by Loren K. Wiseman and published in 1998, GURPS Traveller uses the third edition of the GURPS system. This takes place in an alternative timeline in which no Rebellion occurred and Virus was never released.

==== Traveller^{20} ====
Published by QuickLink Interactive (QLI) in 2002, this version uses the d20 System as its base and is set at the time of the Solomani Rim War around Imperial year 990, about a century before the era depicted in the original game. The preferred setting is the Gateway Domain region of the Imperium. After the company's license to the Traveller brand and setting lapsed, the purely mechanical elements of this game were republished as the generic SciFi20 system.

==== GURPS Traveller: Interstellar Wars ====
In 2006, Steve Jackson Games released GURPS Traveller: Interstellar Wars (GTIW) for the 4th edition of GURPS from 2004. The timeline was rolled back to 2170, which is several millennia earlier than the usual Traveller setting, to the early days of Earth's presence in space at the time when Earth first started to send out interstellar ships to include the period just after the Third Interstellar War between the Terran Confederation (Earth) and the gigantic Ziru Sirka Empire (Vland).

==== Traveller Hero ====
A port of the Traveller setting to the Hero System, produced under license by Comstar Games in 2006.

==== Mongoose Traveller ====
Introduced in 2008, Mongoose Publishing published this version both in a traditional format and as an open gaming SRD around which other games may be built.

A second edition was published in 2016 and updated in 2022. It uses a full color production style while the rule set is closely based on the original Traveller rules.

==== Traveller^{5} ====
A new set of rules published in 2013 by original game designer Mark Miller re-working and integrating concepts from earlier rulesets.

The current updated version, v5.10, was printed in 2019 as three distinct books: Characters and Combat, Starships, and Worlds and Adventures. This edition uses Uncertain checks in which one of the dice in certain situations is rolled in secret by the gamemaster.

=== Format ===
The original game books had black covers and digest-sized, commonly nicknamed the "little black books". The main rules were detailed in three such booklets, sold as a boxed set while the same format was used for early support material, such as the adventures, supplements and further books. Later supplements and updated versions of the main game system introduced full sized booklets, complete re-writes of the game system and significant changes to the Third Imperium.

== Reception ==
In the April–May 1978 edition of White Dwarf (Issue #6), Don Turnbull gave a strong recommendation for the new game, saying, "Altogether, what is here is very satisfactory and much of it is stimulating. The presentation is exemplary, the detail impressive, the treatment exacting and the inventiveness inspired."

In Issue 29 of the British wargaming magazine Perfidious Albion, Charles Vasey commented, "The game depends a lot on the players and especially on the referee. You really have to think it all out and provisions must be made to prevent too large a reward. It is probably better fitted for a long campaign or a PBM."

In the September 1978 edition of Dragon (Issue 18), Tony Watson complimented the game on the high production value of its components, saying, "Physically, Traveller is first class, a tradition with Game Designer's Workshop. The box lid and covers of the three booklets are done in a simple but highly effective combination of red and white lettering on a black background. The interior layout and printing is also of the best quality; the printing is an entirely professional job." Watson liked that experience points were not emphasized in gameplay: "It is refreshing to see that the adventures and color of the game's play is reward enough and the players are not channeling their energy into the rather silly chase of ethereal experience points. Too often, this chase becomes more important than actual play itself!" He concluded with a strong recommendation, saying, "Traveller is a unique SF game and probably the best of the role-playing variety. It offers a colorful but consistent future for players to adventure in."

In the inaugural edition of Ares (March 1980), David Ritchie was enthusiastic about Traveller, giving it an above average rating of 8 out of 9 and commenting, "This game starts off where Dungeons & Dragons left off, but, if there is any justice, will end up being more popular than that venerable relic. For one thing, the Traveller rules are fairly consistent (moreso than is usual for such games)."

In the May–June 1980 edition of The Space Gamer (Issue No. 28), Forrest Johnson gave a good review, saying, "Traveller is the best game of its type, recommended for the sophisticated science fiction gamer."

In the November 1980 edition of Ares (Issue #5), Eric Goldberg called Traveller "a most impressive achievement from a design standpoint... This mark of distinction is the main reason why I consider Traveller the finest commercially available role-playing game." Goldberg didn't consider it perfect, criticizing the game's lack of imaginary vision of technology of the future. Although he liked the "sophisticated and elegant" character generation system, he felt that "All too often, a player will have to spend an entire afternoon rolling dice before he gains a reasonable character." Goldberg concluded with a positive recommendation: "If you have at least a casual interest in science fiction and role-playing, you should definitely invest in a copy of Traveller"

In the 1980 book The Complete Book of Wargames, game designer Jon Freeman commented, "Traveller is the only serious attempt to provide a really comprehensive set of role-playing rules for science fiction: interstellar travel, exploration, trade, combat at all levels, and so on." Freeman warned potential players, "Considering the territory it seeks to cover, Traveller is necessarily complex, and it presumes on the part of the potential referee considerable familiarity with other role-playing games and the literature of science fiction." Freeman gave this game an Overall Evaluation of "Good", concluding, "For experienced players wishing a truly open-ended, science fiction, role-playing campaign, there is no real alternative."

In the October–November 1981 edition of White Dwarf, Andy Slack reviewed the Deluxe Traveller Edition, a compilation of the three original rules booklets, plus Book 0 - An Introduction to Traveller, and an adventure, "The Imperial Fringe". Slack thought this edition was better laid out, and "typos have been rectified." Because he believed that this edition was not substantially different than the original set, he only rated this edition a 4 out of 10 for experienced players who already owned the original rule booklets; but for new players, he rated it a perfect 10 out of 10.

In the inaugural edition of Games International (October 1988), Jake Thornton gave MegaTraveller an above-average rating of 4 out of 5, saying, "Although there are some typos and omissions, overall, MegaTraveller is a success. If you like your SF on a grand, starspanning scale [...] then MegaTraveller is the system for you."

In his 1990 book The Complete Guide to Role-Playing Games, game critic Rick Swan called this science fiction role-playing game "the standard by which all others are measured ... a brilliant design of remarkable scope ... and a milestone in the hobby." Swan felt this game's popularity stemmed from two reasons: "First, many of the Traveller concepts are so inventive and revolutionary that they continue to ripple through the RPG industry ... Second, the sheer volume of Traveller material ... ensures that the game will continue to attract attention." Swan concluded by giving the game his top rating of 4 out of 4.

Chris W. McCubbin reviewed Traveller: The New Era for Pyramid #2 (July/Aug. 1993) and concluded that, despite some complaints he had about the new version, "Traveller's still around and that's good. I hope it always will be."

Andy Butcher reviewed Traveller for Arcane magazine, rating it a 9 out of 10 overall, and stated that "Traveller is a great game. Marc Miller and Imperium Games have done an outstanding job at capturing the essential elements that gave Traveller its appeal in the first place. Gaming has been without a high-quality, strongly-supported hard science fiction game for too long, but there's no doubt that, on the strength of this, Traveller is back to stay."

Pyramid magazine reviewed Marc Miller's Traveller and stated that "After ogling it assiduously, I finally picked up a copy of the latest edition of Traveller at Gen Con, and I must say I was extremely pleased with it. The questionable changes initiated in The New Era were dumped in favor of the original rules, and all the background information has been retained, making for an extremely vivid and consistent history. Everything the GM needs to play has been condensed into one book."

In the August 1997 edition of Dragon (Issue 238), Rick Swan reviewed the fourth edition of Traveller, and called it "a masterful effort... the best science-fiction RPG I've ever played." On the downside, Swan thought that "The inclusion of anachronistic weapons like swords and crossbows can turn combat into a bad episode of Star Trek." He also pointed out that character growth in the game is very slow: "PCs acquire new skills and abilities about as fast as a tree trunk acquires new growth rings." He also wanted to see more setting information. But he concluded that the fourth edition of Traveller was close to perfect, giving it a top rating of 6 out of 6 and saying, "Time-tested and buffed to a sheen, Traveller will endure as long there's enough plastic to manufacture six-sided dice."

In a 1996 reader poll by Arcane magazine to determine the 50 most popular roleplaying games of all time, Traveller (as either Traveller, MegaTraveller, or Traveller: The New Era) was ranked 3rd. The magazine's editor Paul Pettengale commented: "Although originally intended as a generic science fiction system, Traveller quickly became linked with the Imperium campaign background developed by GDW... This background offers a great degree of freedom for individual referees to run campaigns of their own devising, while providing enough basic groundwork to build from, and has proved to be immensely successful. Everything from political intrigue to action-packed mercenary actions, trading or scientific exploration is possible, and a lot more besides.... Traveller [is] one of the true classics of the roleplaying hobby".

Scott Taylor for Black Gate in 2013 rated Traveller as #2 in the top ten role-playing games of all time, saying "Packaged in a plain black jacket with some simple bars of color, there is nothing inherently fancy about Traveller, and yet it has remained a viable source of entertainment to gamers through ten editions and six gaming companies that have controlled its license."

In a review of the Mongoose version of Traveller in Black Gate, M Harold Page compared it to what came before and said "The new Mongoose Traveller Core Rule Book is a worthy successor to this tradition."

In his 2023 book Monsters, Aliens, and Holes in the Ground, RPG historian Stu Horvath noted, "Traveller is the first RPG that feels like a distinct game, free of D&D's direct influence on its design ... The original Traveller still stands as one of the most significant traditional sci-fi RPGs, thanks in part, to its proximity to the dawn of the hobby, but also to both its scope and the crisp simplicity of its systems. Any game since that involves complex technology ... builds on a foundation established by Traveller."

== Awards ==
- Traveller: The New Era won the 1993 Origins Award for Best Roleplaying Rules, awarded in 1994.
- In 1996, Traveller was inducted into the Origins Hall of Fame.

== In other media ==
=== Software ===
The Imperial Data Recovery System is a computer program published by FASA in 1981 as a play aid to speed up bookkeeping for Traveller, and assist with game aspects such as sector maps, records of characters and ships, and in-game encounters. John M. Morrison reviewed The Imperial Data Recovery System in The Space Gamer No. 50. Morrison commented that "I would seriously recommend that FASA take this off the market and re-write it from the ground up. There's definitely room for a Traveller aid program on the market, but not this one."

The Traveller Navigator was designed by Planet III Software in the 1990s.

GDW licensee Paragon produced two video games based on the Traveller universe:

- MegaTraveller 1: The Zhodani Conspiracy (1990) for Amiga, Atari ST, and MS-DOS
- MegaTraveller 2: Quest for the Ancients (1991) for Amiga and MS-DOS

TravellerMap is an interactive map detailing the primary setting for Traveller. While it was originally fan-made, it has been made canon by reference, which reference states that what appears in real life on that site is what appears in-universe to users of a certain widely used stellar navigational tool.

=== Fiction ===
Traveller game novels
#	Year	Title	Series	Author	Reference and ISBN	Notes
1.	1993	Again, Oytritsyu'aby	—N/a	Charles E. Gannon	—N/a	Novelette
2.	1993	Count or Country	—N/a	Charles E. Gannon	—N/a	Novelette
3.	1993	The Trap of Triton	—N/a	Gary A. Kalin	—N/a	Novelette
5.	1995	Death of Wisdom	Book 1 of 3	Paul Brunette	ISBN 978-1-55878-181-8	
6.	1995	To Dream of Chaos	Book 2 of 3	Paul Brunette	ISBN 978-1-55878-184-9	
7.	1998	Gateway to the Stars	—N/a	Pierce Askegren	ISBN 978-0-671-01188-8	
8.	2005	The Force of Destiny	—N/a	Dale Kemper		
9.	2004	Diaspora Phoenix	—N/a	Martin J. Dougherty	—N/a	
10.	2006	Tales of the New Era 1: Yesterday's Hero	—N/a	Martin J. Dougherty	—N/a	
11.	2010	The Backwards Mask	Book 3 of 3	Paul Brunette		
12.	2011	The Backwards Mask (Alternative)	Book 3 of 3	Matthew Carson		
13.	2012	A Long Way Home: Tales of Congressional Space	—N/a	Terrance McInnes	—N/a	
14.	2014	Shadow of the Storm	—N/a	Martin J. Dougherty	ISBN 978-1-55878-034-7	
15.	2014	Fate of the Kinunir	—N/a	Robert E. Vardeman	ISBN 978-1-55878-029-3	
16.	2015	Agent of the Imperium	—N/a	Marc W. Miller	ISBN 978-1-55878-037-8	
17.	2018	The King Is Dead	Drinax Triad	Gareth Hanrahan	ISBN 978-1-90846086-8	Novelette
18.	2018	Taken on the Run	—N/a	M J Dougherty	ISBN 978-1-908460-85-1	Novelette; 728-907 System
19.	2019	The Frozen Watch	—N/a	Matthew Kerwin	ISBN 978-1-908460-98-1	Novelette; Jewel System
20.	2019	The Dimenos Problem	—N/a	M J Dougherty	ISBN 978-1-908460-99-8	Novelette; Thebus System
21.	2019	A Warrior’s Soul	—N/a	Chris A Jackson	ISBN 978-1-913076-01-6	Novelette Kteiroa System
22.	2019	The Span of the Stars	—N/a	Gareth Hanrahan	ISBN 978-1-913076-02-3	Novelette; Janus System
23.	2019	Girl's Gotta Eat	—N/a	Chris A Jackson	ISBN 978-1-908460-97-4	Novelette; Homestead System
24.	2019	Rachando	Drinax Triad	Kevin Knight	ISBN 978-1-908460-96-7	Novelette
25.	2019	Widowed	—N/a	Chris A. Jackson	ISBN 978-1-908460-95-0	Novelette; Theev System
26.	2019	Wet Work	—N/a	Chris A. Jackson	ISBN 978-1-908460-94-3	Novelette; Dolberg System
27.	2019	Ghouls	—N/a	Richard Lee Byers	ISBN 978-1-913076-00-9	Novelette; Clarke System
28.	2020	The Once and Future Prince	Drinax Triad	Kevin D. Knight	ISBN 978-1-913076-13-9	Novelette
29.	2021	The Wagner Incident	—N/a	Matthew Kerwin	ISBN 978-1-7369487-0-5	Novel; Wagner System
30.	2021	Names	—N/a	Marc Miller	—N/a	Novelette
31.	2022	Adventure Dream	—N/a	Michael Witry	ISBN 978-1-913076-69-6	Novelette
32.	2022	Shadow of the Storm	—N/a	M. J. Dougherty	ISBN 978-1-913076-76-4	Novelette
33.	2023	Far Trader Issue #1	1 of 4	Chris Griffen	ISBN 978-1-915860-415	Comic
34.	2024	The Art of a Warrior	A Sindal Sunrise Story	David Guymer	ISBN 978-1-916675-09-4	Novelette; Empire System
35.	2024	Night of the Dragon	A Sindal Sunrise Story	David Guymer	ISBN 978-1-916675-17-9	Novelette; Vume System
35.	2024	Last Man Standing	A Sindal Sunrise Story	David Guymer	ISBN 978-1-916675-22-3	Novelette; Oghma System
36.	2024	Far Trader Issue #2	2 of 4	Chris Griffen	ISBN 978-1-916968-52-3	Comic
37.	2024	Riftbreaker Issue #1	1 of ??	Chris Griffen	ISBN 978-1-916968-56-1	Comic
38.	2024	Far Trader Issue #3	3 of 4	Chris Griffen	ISBN 978-1-916968-64-6	Comic
39.	2024	The Chamax Plague	—N/a	David Guymer	ISBN 978-1-916675-09-4	Novelette; Chamax System
40.	2025	Far Trader Issue #4	4 of 4	Chris Griffen	ISBN 978-1-917459-69-3	Comic
41.	2025	Riftbreaker Issue #2	2 of ??	Chris Griffen	ISBN 978-1-917459-79-2	Comic
42.	2025	Far Trader	Collection of comics.	Chris Griffen	Hardback ISBN 978-1-918052-15-2; Paperback ISBN 978-1-918052-16-9	Graphic novel
41.	2026	Riftbreaker Issue #3	3 of ??	Chris Griffen	ISBN 978-1-918052-95-4	Comic

==== Notes ====
- Gregory P. Lee's The Laughing Lip series acknowledges the influence of Traveller in the development of the three novels published to date. Lee also wrote the Gamelords supplement Lee's Guide to Interstellar Adventure in the early 1980s.
- Jefferson P. Swycaffer has written several novels set in the "Concordat" fictional universe which he originally developed for aTraveller campaign.
- Two versions of the novel The Backwards Mask exist, written by different authors. The original manuscript by Paul Brunette was lost until after replacement manuscript by Matthew Carson was published. The original was then published as an alternative.

=== Periodicals ===
Gaming magazine White Dwarf ran a comic strip called The Travellers by Mark Harrison from 1983 to 1986. The strip spoofed Traveller and other space opera settings.

The Traveller newsletter Imperiallines was created to showcase Traveller5 features.

The Traveller fanzine Xboat was created and printed for Kickstarter fans in 2019.

=== Music ===
The concept album Traveller by heavy metal band The Lord Weird Slough Feg is based on the game.

== Related role-playing games ==
=== Traveller: 2300/2300 AD ===
Originally published by GDW as an updated replacement for Traveller, eschewing classic space opera to take inspiration from the grittier contemporary hard science fiction media of the 1980s. The first edition was named Traveller: 2300, which incited both confusion and criticism since the game carried over neither the rules nor setting of its namesake. The second edition was renamed 2300 AD, and added some cyberpunk rules and adventures. It is presented as a future extrapolation of the speculative World War III of GDW's popular military role-playing game Twilight: 2000. In the 2300 AD setting, interstellar travel is relatively new, Earth is still divided into nation-states, and the most powerful nations are competitively exploring and colonizing the fifty light-year sphere of surrounding space. Mongoose Publishing released a sourcebook for the setting in 2012 that adapted it to their version of the Traveller rules.

== Cultural effect ==
Computer programs have been created to model and predict starship combat using Traveller rules. The most famous case involved Douglas Lenat applying his Eurisko heuristic learning program to the scenario in the Traveller adventure Trillion Credit Squadron, which contains rules for resolving large space battles statistically. Eurisko exploited corner-case features and built unusual fleets that won the 1981 and 1982 championships. The sponsor stated that if Lenat entered and won the next year they would stop the sponsorship, so Lenat stopped attending.

== See also ==
- Striker (miniatures game)
