= Storm Season (anthology) =

1983 shared fantasy anthology

- Cover art by Walter Velez
- Editor: Robert Lynn Asprin
- Cover artist: Walter Velez
- Series: Thieves' World
- Genre: Fantasy
- Publisher: Ace Fantasy
- Publication date: 1982
- ISBN: 0-441-78712-6
- Preceded by: Shadows of Sanctuary
- Followed by: The Face of Chaos

Storm Season is an anthology of fantasy short stories by various authors published by Ace Fantasy in 1982. It is the fourth anthology set in the shared fantasy setting of the city of Sanctuary known as Thieves' World.

== Publication history ==
In 1978, Robert Lynn Asprin created a fantasy setting in the squalid city of Sanctuary, better known as "Thieves' World", and convinced a number of well-known fantasy authors to contribute to a collection of fantasy short stories using this setting. Although the setting of Sanctuary would be shared, each author would write a story from the viewpoint of their own protagonist. Although authors could "borrow" other authors' characters, they could not harm them or kill them off.

The result was the bestselling Thieves' World (1979, ISBN 0-441-80582-5), which was nominated for a number of awards.

This was followed by Tales from the Vulgar Unicorn (1980) and Shadows of Sanctuary (1981); the fourth in the series was Storm Season, published by Ace Fantasy in 1982.

Asprin would edit another eight anthologies in the series. A further two anthologies were edited by Lynn Abbey.

== Contents ==
After an Introduction by editor Robert Lynn Asprin, the book contains six short stories:

- "Exercise in Pain" by Robert Lynn Asprin
- "Downwind" by C. J. Cherryh
- "A Fugitive Art" by Diana L. Paxson
- "Steel" by Lynn Abbey
- "Wizard Weather" by Janet Morris
- "Godson" by Andrew J. Offutt

The book ends with an epilog by Asprin.

== Reception ==
In Issue 26 of Abyss, Eric Olson noted "Each story is distinct and has its own qualities, but the interrelationships are preserved quite well." Olson concluded, "As a whole Storm Season is very good. While it may not be up to the level of Thieves World, the first book, it is better than the last one, Shadows of Sanctuary."

In Issue 49 of Science Fiction Review, Robert Sabella wrote, "As in previous volumes, the stories are serious heroic fantasy, concerned more with characterizations and plot development than Conanization and page after page of mindless slaughter." Sabella felt "The book's major flaw is that some stories are so carefully written their pace suffers. Still, contributors such as C.J. Cherryh, Andy Offutt and Lynn Abbey keep the quality quite high throughout." Sabella concluded, "This book is part of a continuing effort by its authors as well as the likes of Jessica Amanda Salmonson and Fritz Leiber to modernize heroic fantasy from the pap that Robert Howard created fifty years ago. For me, at least, they have succeeded. I recommend the entire series highly." In the same issue, Alma Jo Williams commented, "The action is a tad bit slower and the intrigues and conversations a bit more convoluted but recommended just the same."

In Issue 76 of Dragon, Mike Lowrey commented, "This peculiar experiment — a coordinated equivalent to the creation of such cycles as those about Arthur and Charlemagne — has been received with plaudits and, more importantly, with brisk sales." However, Lowrey found Storm Season "a bit of a letdown. For the first time, no new writers, and only a handful of new characters, are introduced to the collective unconscious of Sanctuary in this volume. In a curious parallel to the cover paintings, fewer characters are the focal point of the artwork; those few which have remained so are overdrawn to the point of near obsession." However, Lowrey admitted, "Storm Season is certainly not lacking in action: slaughter, feud, betrayal, invasion, kidnapping, condemnation, theft, god-slaying, and all the other forms of liveliness that make Sanctuary such a fascinating place to read about safely at home, but such a hellhole for the visitors and inhabitants." Lowrey concluded with a warning: "The events in Storm Season indicate that the next book promises to be lively indeed; but the buyer of this one should seek light-hearted fantasy elsewhere."

== Awards ==
- In 1983, Storm Season was nominated for a Locus Magazine Award.

== Other reviews ==
- Fantasy Newsletter, #58 (April 1983): Review by Roger C. Schlobin
- Paperback Inferno #55, 1985: Review by Nigel E. Richardson
