= The Sacred Band of Stepsons =

Fictional ancient cavalry unit

Book cover: The Sacred Band

The Sacred Band of Stepsons is a fictional ancient cavalry unit created by Janet Morris and based on the historical Sacred Band of Thebes, an elite strike force of paired lovers and friends that flourished during the fourth century BC in ancient Greece. The Sacred Band of Stepsons series of fantasy novels and stories take place in a myth-like milieu that mixes historical places such as Nisibis, Mygdonia and Chaeronea; warriors such as Theagenes (commander of the Theban Sacred Band at Chaeronea); gods such as Enlil, Maat and Harmonia; philosophers such as Heraclitus and Thales; cavalry tactics and customs such as homosexuality in the militaries of ancient Greece with those that exist only in fantasy. The exploits of the Stepsons are chronicled in eleven short stories and nine novels (as of 2012). In a fantasy context, this series explores the difficulties facing war-fighters in personal relationships and the enduring questions surrounding the military's historical mixing of homosexuals and heterosexuals in combat.

== Evolution of the fictional Sacred Band of Stepsons ==
The Sacred Band of Stepsons first appeared as shock troops in the Thieves' World series in 1981 with the story, "A Man and His God," a historical fantasy novella based on the Sacred Band of Thebes, an elite Theban homosexual war-band (Hieròs Lókhos) during the 4th century B.C.

Because Thieves' World was a "shared universe" where many writers could use the same characters, others wrote stories featuring the Stepsons and their immortal commander, Tempus. Notable authors who wrote stories featuring characters from the Sacred Band of Stepsons include Chris Morris, Robert Asprin, Lynn Abbey, Andrew Offutt, and C. J. Cherryh.

For nearly a decade, Janet Morris wrote stories and novels, some with Chris Morris, about Tempus and his Sacred Band. Morris's first Sacred Band of Stepsons novel, Beyond Sanctuary, was the first "authorized" Thieves' World spin-off novel and was published in hardcover by Baen Books and then the Science Fiction Book Club. Beyond Sanctuary was reviewed by Library Journal and by Publishers Weekly. Next came "Beyond the Veil," also a Baen hardcover and Science Fiction Book Club Selection. Beyond the Veil was reviewed by Kirkus Reviews and by Fantasy Review. The Baen hardcover and Science Fiction Book Club publication of Beyond Wizardwall completed publication of the trilogy. Three additional Stepsons novels and a short story per year followed until 1990, when the Morrises ceased production until 2010. In the latest Stepsons novels, The Sacred Band (2010), The Fish the Fighters and the Song-girl (2012), the Stepsons rescue twenty-three couples of the historical Sacred Band of Thebes at the Battle of Chaeronea and bring them, with their Greek Fates and gods, to Sanctuary and out again. The Sacred Band and eight other related novels were reviewed by Black Gate.

== History, myth, and philosophy meet fantasy ==
Classical correspondences abound, as analyzed in detail by Edgeworth. The Band's commander, Tempus, rides a Tros horse, akin to the Iliad's man-devouring white horses from Troy. Tempus's leopard-skin mantle and boar's-tooth helmet, his choice of panoply and mount and food and drink, and many other allusions and references hark back to Homer's Iliad. Edgeworth discusses Tempus's choices in detail:

He wears a helmet crowned with boar's teeth (Tempus [1987] 273), as does Odysseus in Iliad X, and a "leopard-skin mantle...from ancient times" (Tempus 273), as does Paris in Iliad VI. For a beverage he favors a mixture of wine and barley and cheese ("High Moon" 223, in The Face of Chaos [1983]; cf. Beyond Wizardwall [1986] 111), which is what Hecamede serves to Nestor and Patroclus in Iliad XI. And he rides on one of the finest horses in the universe, known as a "Tros" horse. In antiquity the finest horses were thought to have been owned by the royal house of Troy, whose eponymous founder was named Tros.

The web of connectivity to classical sources in this series is extensive. As Edgeworth explores at length, the authors mix historicity, philosophy and myth. Tempus quotes the philosophers Heraclitus and Thales and some other characters call him 'Tempus Thales.' The milieus in which the Stepsons find themselves sometimes resemble but seldom duplicate our own. Paired Sacred Banders such as Critias and Straton have historical counterparts in ancient Greece; the witch who stalks Nikodemos through many novels and stories is called Roxane, who shares that name with the wife of Alexander the Great of Macedon. Many other parallels exist, along with a wealth of detail evoking our classical world. And yet, as Edgeworth points out, knowledge of the ancient world and its history is not necessary to understand the stories, which can be read purely as fantasy.

== Composition ==
The Sacred Band of Stepsons is a multinational force, and eventually includes twenty-three couples from the Sacred Band of Thebes who fought at the Battle of Chaeronea in 338 BC. Like the historic Sacred Band of Thebes (378-338 BC), the Stepsons serve as an elite strike force. Unlike today's prevailing vision of the Theban Sacred Band, the Stepsons mix pairs and individual war-fighters in a single unit. Both Sacred Bands adhere to the ancient military model of the Sacred Bands, special units who prize honor above all and die in battle rather than desert their partners, lovers or beloveds.

== Constitution of the Stepsons ==
The Sacred Band of Stepsons was developed by their fictional commander, Tempus, from an original ten pairs of lovers and friends, plus thirty single mercenaries. These original pairs of Stepsons followed the social model of the Sacred Band of Thebes, and so did other pairs recruited subsequently. Edgeworth says of Tempus's Sacred Band:

He commands a group known as the "Sacred Band," warriors who pair off for life, obviously inspired by the similar Sacred Band of Thebes (....) Homosexual relations were not unknown in either group ("High Moon" 223, 242). The Band was founded by Abarsis, a priest from the North ("A Man and his God" 571, 589 in Shadows of Sanctuary [1981]), whose name differs by only one letter from Abaris, a priest from the North said by Herodotus (Book IV) to have visited Greece.

In Tempus's Band, heterosexual Stepsons and Sacred Band pairs fight side by side. There is no requirement to be part of a couple to serve among the Stepsons, and single mercenaries initially outnumbered the Sacred Band pairs.

The Stepsons are principally a cavalry (hippeis) squadron, not heavy infantry (hoplites) as the Theban Sacred Banders primarily were. While the three-hundred-strong Theban Sacred Band was constituted by Theban law-givers and maintained by the Theban state (according to Plutarch's "Life" of Pelopidas), the Sacred Band of Stepsons is loyal only to its members and its commander, Tempus. Among the Stepsons, fathers and sons and Platonic couples, as well as single male and female fighters, can serve. In this mixed company, couples and individual cavalry and infantry fighters are recruited as circumstances required. To this end, the Stepsons rescued twenty-three pairs from the doomed Theban Sacred Band at the Battle of Chaeronea and integrated the survivors into their force. At full strength, the Stepsons number as many as three hundred and sixty fighters and have fought in three major campaigns.

== Reception ==
Library Journal's Jackie Cassada said in her 1985 review of Beyond Sanctuary: "The first novel to emerge from the Thieves' World stories features one of the notorious city of Sanctuary's most complex and problematical residents: Tempus, a warrior who cannot die and cannot enjoy his immortality. Sworn to defend the Rankan Empire from its northern enemies, Tempus leads a band of mercenaries, wizards, and an extraordinary woman against the mages of Wizardwall. While showing a fine flair for the sword-and-sorcery genre, Morris succeeds as well in making her more-than-human characters more than entertaining."

Kirkus Reviews said of Beyond the Veil: "sword and sorcery reign supreme...main thrust here concerns the effort of immortal, sleepless, accursed Tempus, the junior wizard Randal, the knightly Critias to counter the evil conspiracies of the spirited witch Roxane -- a power struggle complicated by an assortment of slaves, walking undead, rogues, slavering beasties, aloof wizards, pregnant warriors, vile devils, demonic avatars, and meddlesome gods...absorbing and enjoyable fantasy."

Black Gate said of The Sacred Band: "This is not sword and sorcery, this is not elves and dwarves and high-concept fantasy… The Sacred Band has the sharp edge of reality, the harshness, the bitterness and the danger of the real world. Love, loyalty, honor — these are the ideals by which these characters live and die. This novel is epic in scope. It is mythic by heritage. It is positively Homeric."

Robert W. Cape, Jr., in Classical Traditions in Science Fiction wrote of Tempus (1987; 2011), Tempus Unbound (1989; 2017) and The Sacred Band (2010) "A fantasy series about the Sacred Band of Stepsons, an elite army modeled on the fourth-century B.C.E. Sacred Band of Thebes. The stories explore the fraught personal relationships of mixed hetero- and homosexual troops, only sometimes paired, as they fight for their commander, the immortal Tempus. Morris includes archaeological and historical details, from physical items to social practices, religion, and philosophy, to create a fantasy world that is, in many ways, more historically accurate than many popular accounts of antiquity."

== Novels ==
- Beyond Sanctuary, (1985)
- Beyond the Veil, (1985)
- Beyond Wizardwall, (1986)
- Tempus, (1987)
- City at the Edge of Time, (1988) (with Chris Morris)
- Tempus Unbound (1989), (with Chris Morris)
- Storm Seed (1990), (with Chris Morris)
- The Sacred Band (2010), (with Chris Morris)
- The Fish the Fighters and the Song-Girl (2012), (with Chris Morris)

== Short stories ==
- “Vashanka’s Minion,” Tales from the Vulgar Unicorn (1980), Asprin, ed.
- “A Man and His God,” Shadows of Sanctuary (1981), Asprin, ed.
- “Wizard Weather,” Storm Season (1982), Asprin, ed.
- “An End to Dreaming,” Whispers #5 (1982), Schiff, ed.
- “High Moon,” Face of Chaos, (1983), Asprin and Abbey, ed.
- “What Women Do Best,” Wings of Omen (1984) (with Chris Morris), Asprin and Abbey, ed.
- “Hell to Pay,” The Dead of Winter (1985) Asprin and Abbey, ed.
- “Power Play,” Soul of the City (1986) (with Lynn Abbey and C. J. Cherryh)
- “Pillar of Fire,” Soul of the City (1986) (with Lynn Abbey and C. J. Cherryh)
- “Sanctuary is for Lovers,” Blood Ties (1986) (with Chris Morris), Asprin and Abbey, ed.
- “Wake of the Riddler,” Aftermath (1987), Asprin and Abbey, ed.
- “Red Light, Love Light,” Uneasy Alliances, (1988) by Chris Morris, Asprin and Abbey, ed.

== See also ==
- Sacred Band of Thebes
- Gorgidas
- Lochos
- Homosexuality in the militaries of ancient Greece
- Homosexuality in Ancient Greece
