= Thieves' World =

Shared world fantasy series by Robert Asprin

- Thieves' World #1 (Original Printing)
- Thieves' World; Tales from the Vulgar Unicorn; Storm Season
- Author: Robert Lynn Asprin
- Country: United States
- Language: English
- Genre: Fantasy; Adventure; Shared world
- Published: 1979–1989 (Original Series); 2002–2004 (New Anthologies)
- Media type: Print (hardcover, paperback)

Thieves' World is a low fantasy shared world created by Robert Lynn Asprin in 1978. The original series comprised twelve anthologies, including stories by science fiction and fantasy authors Poul Anderson, John Brunner, Andrew J. Offutt, C. J. Cherryh, Janet Morris, and Chris Morris.

== Overview ==
Thieves' World is set in the city of Sanctuary at the edge of the Rankan Empire. The city is depicted as a place where many are downtrodden and where the invading Rankan gods and the Ilsigi gods they had ousted begin a struggle for dominance. As the series continues, additional invasions occur, and the city is taken over by the snake-worshipping Beysib as the Rankan empire collapses. Over time, a number of the characters in the series are revealed either to be the offspring of or otherwise blessed by various figures in the pantheons of the competing deities, and they discover or develop various powers as the series progresses.

First published in 1979, the series went on hiatus in 1989 after the twelfth anthology. In addition to the official anthologies, authors have published novels set in Thieves' World.

In 2002, Lynn Abbey, who co-edited several of the original anthologies, relaunched the series with the novel Sanctuary. This was followed by the anthologies Turning Points and Enemies of Fortune, which contain some returning authors and several new ones. Abbey also oversaw the republication of the original anthologies in omnibus editions.

== Concept and origin ==
The Thieves' World anthologies were conceived by authors Robert Lynn Asprin, Lynn Abbey, and Gordon R. Dickson during a casual meeting at the Boston science-fiction convention Boskone in 1978. Asprin suggested that the task of world-building was a major hurdle for modern fantasy writers:

"Whenever one set out to write heroic fantasy, it was first necessary to reinvent the universe from scratch regardless of what had gone before. Despite the carefully crafted Hyborean world of Howard or even the delightfully complex town of Lankhmar which Leiber created, every author was expected to beat his head against the writing table and devise a world of his own. Imagine, I proposed, if our favorite sword-and-sorcery characters shared the same settings and time-frames. Imagine the story potentials.”

Abbey described the 1978 meeting as "a casual conversation [that] changed the lives of a couple dozen people who had no idea what they had been missing or what they were getting into." The writers who were recruited for the series saw Thieves' World as both a challenge and an opportunity to bring "new oddments of human behavior, new quirks of character that the authors wouldn't dare put in a universe for which he or she was solely responsible."

== Geography ==
Abbey stated that the geography of Sanctuary and its surrounding regions shifted due to each writer's needs. "We had Crom-many drugs, magicians, vices, brothels, dives, haunts, curses, and feuds. Sanctuary wasn't a provincial backwater; it wasn't even the Imperial armpit; it was the Black Hole of not-Calcutta."

The city itself was envisioned as a late medieval town with similarities to the Shambles in York, England, and additional elements of Baghdad. The faraway capital city of Ranke is based on Rome. "Nobody knows how big Sanctuary really is. Anytime any one of us needs a secret meeting place we just create one – Sanctuary is either very large or very cramped."

== Storylines and chronology ==
The dynamics of sharing characters led to some conflicts between authors, as referenced by C. J. Cherryh in her afterword to Blood Ties: "You write your first Thieves' World story for pay, you write your second for revenge."

In an interview for Green Ronin's roleplaying guide to the setting, Abbey explained the increase of interconnected storylines as the series progressed. "The stories of the first few volumes stood by themselves. But starting in about volume three (Shadows of Sanctuary) the authors began collaborating... big time. Eventually just about every author worked with the same plot threads, some of which stretched over several volumes." Authors would often mine each other's stories for plot ideas, with a minor plot point or piece of dialogue turning into a complete story in a subsequent volume.

Asprin addressed the difficulty of the intersecting, overlapping, and diverging timelines in the preface to the fourth anthology, Storm Season: "While in earlier volumes I have tried to keep the stories in the order in which they occur, this has proved to be impossible in Storm Season... I've left it to the reader to understand what is happening and construct his/her mental timeline as necessary."

Abbey noted that the interwoven plots ultimately hurt the series' readership: "The very plot and character denseness of a Thieves' World volume, while it was eagerly anticipated by long-time readers, was a bit intimidating to anyone who hadn't been following the series from the beginning." Her observation led to a revised approach for the 2002 relaunch. "When we went to work on 'new Thieves' World', we tried to find a happy medium between stand-alone stories and densely interwoven plots. In Turning Points and Enemies of Fortune there are a few events and situations that serve as a backdrop for the stories."

== Reception and awards ==
=== Industry reactions ===
The Thieves' World anthologies are credited as "pioneering and setting the standard for the shared world format", and the Journal of the Fantastic in the Arts cites Thieves' World as the "first and protype of the form".

Science fiction author Cory Doctorow says the series "rocked my world when I was about 13", and author Robin Hobb called its concept of a collective setting and characters "a brilliant idea". Author and game designer Robert J. Schwalb said "Thieves' World is to authors what D&D is to gamers."

Greg Costikyan reviewed Thieves' World in gaming magazineAres Magazine #1. Costikyan commented that "since fantasy role-playing involves the group production of a multi-hero fantasy story, role-playing fans especially will find Thieves' World enjoyable. [...] The stories themselves range from mediocre to excellent, but all are worth reading."

The Encyclopedia of Fantasy describes the series: "It is in the creation and editorial supervision of the Thieves' World sequence of shared world anthologies ... that Asprin ‒ in collaboration with Abbey ‒ has done his most original work."

In an essay included in the second volume, Tales from the Vulgar Unicorn, Asprin noted that, though fan response was mostly positive and high sales had led to sequels and the development of the Chaosium board game, many readers had written to the publisher to comment on the series' overall lack of humor.

=== Awards ===
Thieves' World

- Balrog Award 1980: Best Collection/Anthology (nominated)
- Locus Award 1980: Best Collection/Anthology (nominated)
- World Fantasy Award 1980: Best Collection/Anthology (nominated)

Tales from the Vulgar Unicorn

- Balrog Award 1981: Best Collection/Anthology (nominated)
- Locus Award 1981: Best Collection/Anthology (nominated)

Shadows of Sanctuary

- Balrog Award 1982: Best Collection/Anthology (winner)
- Locus Award 1982: Best Collection/Anthology (winner)

== Original anthologies (1979-1989) ==
- Thieves' World (1979) ISBN 0-441-80582-5
  - "Introduction" by Robert Lynn Asprin
  - "Sentences of Death" by John Brunner
  - "The Face of Chaos" by Lynn Abbey
  - "The Gate of the Flying Knives" by Poul Anderson
  - "Shadowspawn" by Andrew Offutt
  - "The Price of Doing Business" by Robert Lynn Asprin
  - "Blood Brothers" by Joe Haldeman
  - "Myrtis" by Christine DeWees
  - "The Secret of the Blue Star" by Marion Zimmer Bradley
  - Essay: "The Making of Thieves' World" by Robert Lynn Asprin
- Tales from the Vulgar Unicorn (1980) ISBN 0-44179578-1
  - "Introduction" by Robert Lynn Asprin
  - "Spiders of the Purple Mage" by Philip José Farmer
  - "Goddess" by David Drake
  - "The Fruit of Enlibar" by Lynn Abbey
  - "The Dream of the Sorceress" by A.E. van Vogt
  - "Vashanka's Minion" by Janet Morris
  - "Shadow's Pawn" by Andrew J. Offutt
  - "To Guard the Guardians" by Robert Lynn Asprin
  - Essay: "The Lighter Side of Sanctuary" by Robert Lynn Asprin
- Shadows of Sanctuary (1981) ISBN 0-441-76028-7
  - "Looking for Satan" by Vonda N. McIntyre
  - "Ischade" by C.J. Cherryh
  - "A Gift in Parting" by Robert Lynn Asprin
  - "The Vivisectionist" by Andrew J. Offutt
  - "The Rhinoceros and the Unicorn" by Diana L. Paxson
  - "Then Azyuna Danced" by Lynn Abbey
  - "A Man and His God" by Janet Morris
  - Essay: "Things the Editor Never Told Me" by Lynn Abbey
- Storm Season (1982) ISBN 0-441-78712-6
  - Introduction by Robert Lynn Asprin
  - "Exercise in Pain" by Robert Lynn Asprin
  - "Downwind" by C. J. Cherryh
  - "A Fugitive Art" by Diana L. Paxson
  - "Steel" by Lynn Abbey
  - "Wizard Weather" by Janet Morris
  - "Godson" by Andrew J. Offutt
  - Epilog by Robert Lynn Asprin
- The Face of Chaos (1983) ISBN 0-441-80587-6
  - "High Moon" by Janet Morris
  - "Necromant" by C. J. Cherryh
  - "The Art of Alliance" by Robert Lynn Asprin
  - "The Corners of Memory" by Lynn Abbey
  - "Votary" by David Drake
  - "Mirror Image" by Diana L. Paxson
- Wings of Omen (1984) ISBN 0-441-805949
  - "What Women Do Best" by Chris and Janet Morris
  - "Daughter of the Sun" by Robin W. Bailey
  - "A Breath of Power" by Diana L. Paxson
  - "The Hand That Feeds You" by Diane Duane
  - "Witching Hour" by C. J. Cherryh
  - "Rebels Aren't Born in Palaces" by Andrew J. Offutt
  - "Gyskouras" by Lynn Abbey
  - "A Fish With Feathers is Out of His Depth" by Robert Lynn Asprin
- The Dead of Winter (1985) ISBN 0-441-14089-0
  - "Hell to Pay" by Janet Morris
  - "The Veiled Lady, or A Look at the Normal Folk" by Andrew Offutt
  - "The God-Chosen" by Lynn Abbey
  - "Keeping Promises" by Robin W. Bailey
  - "Armies of the Night" by C. J. Cherryh
  - "Down by the Riverside" by Diane Duane
  - "When the Spirit Moves You" by Robert Lynn Asprin
  - "The Color of Magic" by Diana L. Paxson
- Soul of the City (1986) ISBN 0-441-77581-0
  - "Power Play" by Janet Morris
  - "Dagger in the Mind" by C. J. Cherryh
  - "Children of All Ages" by Lynn Abbey
  - "Death in the Meadow" by C. J. Cherryh
  - "The Small Powers that Endure" by Lynn Abbey
  - "Pillar of Fire" by Janet Morris
- Blood Ties (1986) ISBN 0-441-80595-7
  - "Introduction" by Robert Lynn Asprin
  - "Lady of Fire" by Diana L. Paxson
  - "Sanctuary Is for Lovers" by Janet and Chris Morris
  - "Lovers Who Slay Together" by Robin Wayne Bailey
  - "In the Still of the Night" by C. J. Cherryh
  - "No Glad in Gladiator" by Robert Lynn Asprin
  - "The Tie That Binds" by Diane Duane
  - "Sanctuary Nocturne" by Lynn Abbey
  - "Spellmaster" by Andrew Offutt and Jodie Offutt
  - "Afterword" by C. J. Cherryh
- Aftermath (1987) ISBN 0-441-80597-3
  - "Introduction" by Robert Lynn Asprin
  - "Cade" by Mark C. Perry
  - "Wake of the Riddler" by Janet Morris
  - "Inheritor" by David Drake
  - "Mercy Worse Than None" by John Brunner
  - "Seeing is Believing (But Love Is Blind)" by Lynn Abbey
  - "Homecoming" by Andrew Offutt
- Uneasy Alliances (1988) ISBN 0-441-80610-4
  - "Introduction" by Lynn Abbey
  - "Slave Trade" by Robert Lynn Asprin
  - "The Best of Friends" by C. J. Cherryh
  - "The Power of Kings" by Jon DeCles
  - "Red Light, Love Light" by Chris Morris
  - "A Sticky Business" by C. S. Williams
  - "The Promise of Heaven" by Robin Wayne Bailey
  - "The Vision of Lalo" by Diana L. Paxson
- Stealers' Sky (1989) ISBN 0-441-80612-0
  - "Introduction" by Robert Lynn Asprin
  - "Night Work" by Andrew Offutt
  - "The Incompetent Audience" by John DeCles
  - "Our Vintage Years" by Duane McGowen
  - "Quicksilver Dreams" by Diana L. Paxson
  - "Winds of Fortune" by C. J. Cherryh
  - "The Fire in a God's Eye" by Robin Wayne Bailey
  - "Web Weavers" by Lynn Abbey
  - "To Begin Again" by Robert Lynn Asprin

== New anthologies (2002-2004) ==
- Turning Points (2002)
  - Introduction by Lynn Abbey
  - "Home Is Where the Hate Is" by Mickey Zucker Reichert
  - "Role Model" by Andrew Offutt
  - "The Prisoner in the Jewel" by Diane L. Paxson
  - "Ritual Evolution" by Selina Rosen
  - "Duel" by Dennis L. Mckiernan
  - "Ring of Sea and Fire" by Robin Wayne Bailey
  - "Doing the Gods' Work" by Jody Lynn Nye
  - "The Red Lucky" by Lynn Abbey
  - "Apocalypse Noun" by Jeff Grubb
  - "One to Go" by Raymond E. Feist
  - Afterword by Lynn Abbey
- Enemies of Fortune (2004)
  - Introduction by Lynn Abbey
  - "Widowmaker" by C. J. Cherryh and Jane Fancher
  - "Deadly Ritual" by Mickey Zucker Reichert
  - "Pricks and Afflictions" by Dennis L. Mckiernan
  - "Consequences" by Jody Lynn Nye
  - "Good Neighbours" by Lynn Abbey
  - "Gathering Strength" by Selina Rosen
  - "Dark of the Moon" by Andrew Offutt
  - "Protection" by Robin Wayne Bailey
  - "Legacies" by Jane Fancher and C. J. Cherryh
  - "Malediction" by Jeff Grubb
  - "The Ghost in the Phoenix" by Diana L. Paxson and Ian Grey
  - "The Man from Shemhaza" by Steven Brust

== Other works ==
Several Thieves' World standalone novels and short stories have been published in addition to the official anthologies.

Janet Morris introduced The Sacred Band of Stepsons in Thieves' World and expanded their story in a series of novels about them and their ancient cavalry commander, Tempus. The first three novels in The Sacred Band of Stepsons saga were authorized Thieves' World novels. Marion Zimmer Bradley was an early contributor to the Thieves' World anthologies, but spun off her main character in the novel Lythande (1986) and did not return for later volumes.

The first six Morris novels were published in mass market paperback by Ace Books and subsequently expanded in Author's Cut trade paper editions by Perseid Press.

=== Novels ===
- Janet Morris, Beyond Sanctuary (1985), a Science Fiction Book club Selection, Baen Books
- Janet Morris, Beyond the Veil (1985), a Science Fiction Book Club Selection, Baen Books
- Janet Morris, Beyond Wizardwall (1986), a Science Fiction Book Club Selection, Baen Books
- Andrew J. Offutt, Shadowspawn (1987)
- Janet Morris, Tempus (1987) - a fix-up novel collecting the Tempus stories from the anthologies with additional content
- Janet Morris, Chris Morris, City at the Edge of Time (1988)
- David Drake, Dagger (1988) - The first part of the novel had appeared in the anthology Aftermath
- Andrew J. Offutt, The Shadow of Sorcery (1993)
- Lynn Abbey, Sanctuary (2002) Tor Books
- Janet Morris, Chris Morris, Tempus Unbound (1989)
- Janet Morris, Chris Morris, Storm Seed (1990)
- Janet Morris, Chris Morris, The Sacred Band (2010)
- Janet Morris, Chris Morris, Tempus With His Right Side Companion Niko (2011) - rewrite of previously released material
- Janet Morris, Chris Morris, The Fish the Fighters and the Song-girl (2012) - rewrite o of previously released material

=== Collections ===
- Marion Zimmer Bradley, Lythande (1986) - a collection which includes two stories from the anthologies

== Short fiction first published outside of the anthologies ==
- Marion Zimmer Bradley, "Bitch" (1987) - short story, in The Magazine of Fantasy & Science Fiction, February 1987
- Marion Zimmer Bradley, "The Walker Behind" (1987) - short story - The Magazine of Fantasy & Science Fiction, July 1987
- Marion Zimmer Bradley, "The Malice of the Demon" (1988) - short story - The Magazine of Fantasy & Science Fiction, September 1988
- Marion Zimmer Bradley, "Here There Be Dragons?" (1995) - short story
- Robin Wayne Bailey, "The Stars Are Tears" (1996) - short story
- Marion Zimmer Bradley, "The Gratitude of Kings" (1998) - short story
- Poul Anderson, "The Lady of the Winds" (2001) - short story - later collected in Tor Books anthology First Blood
- Lynn Abbey, "A Tale of Two Cities" (2005) - a short story included in the Thieves' World Player's Manual

== Omnibuses ==
- Sanctuary 1982. Book Club hardcover omnibus collecting Thieves’ World, Tales from the Vulgar Unicorn, and Shadows of Sanctuary.
- Cross-Currents 1984. Book Club Hardcover omnibus collecting: "Storm Season", “The Face of Chaos”, and "Wings of Omen".
- The Shattered Sphere 1986. Book Club Hardcover omnibus collecting: “The Dead of Winter”, “Soul of the City”, and “Blood Ties”.
- The Price of Victory 1989. Book Club Hardcover omnibus collecting: "Aftermath", "Uneasy Alliances", and "Stealers’ Sky".
- First Blood 2003. Tor Paperback omnibus collecting Thieves’ World, Tales from the Vulgar Unicorn, and "The Lady of the Winds".

== Comics ==
Published by Starblaze Graphics and illustrated by Tim Sale, the original series was produced in black and white except for the covers.

- Thieves' World Graphics 1 (1985). Containing: 1) "Introduction" 2) "Someone is always awake in Sanctuary..." (original) 3) "Sentences of Death" 4) "Myrtis" 5) "The Price of Doing Business"
- Thieves' World Graphics 2 (1986). Containing: 1) Blood Brothers; 2) The Face of Chaos; 3) Gaeta (original); 4) Shadowspawn.
- Thieves' World Graphics 3 (1986). Containing: 1) The Dream of the Sorceress; The Blue Camel (original); 3) Vashanka's Minion.
- Thieves' World Graphics 4 (1986). Containing: 1) Shadow's Pawn; 2) Runcigor and Alminda (original); 3) To Guard the Guardians.
- Thieves' World Graphics 5 (1987). Containing: 1) Looking for Satan; 2) Ischade; 3) A Gift in Parting.
- Thieves' World Graphics 6 (1987). Containing: 1) The Vivisectionist; 2) The Rhinoceros and the Unicorn; 3) Arvo the Nose (original).

Thieves' World Graphics (1986) collects volumes 1 to 3 above, colorized and with a new cover by David A. Cherry

== Role playing games ==
- Thieves' World Complete Sanctuary Adventure Pack (Chaosium Box Set, 1981). Containing: 1) The Player's Guide to Sanctuary; 2) The Gamemaster's Guide to Sanctuary; 3) Personalities of Sanctuary; 4) Map of Sanctuary; 5) Map of the Maze; 6) Map of the Maze Underground.
- The Blue Camel (mini-adventure; FASA, 1982)
- T1 - Traitor (FASA, 1982)
- T2 - The Spirit Stones (FASA, 1982)
- T3 - Dark Assassin (FASA, 1982)
- T4 - Vengeance (FASA, 198?)
- Sanctuary Under the Beysibs (Chaosium Companion, 1986)
- Thieves' World Player's Manual (Green Ronin, 2005)
- Shadowspawn's Guide to Sanctuary (Green Ronin, 2005)
- Thieves' World Gazetteer (Green Ronin, 2005)
- Murder at the Vulgar Unicorn (Green Ronin, 2005)
- Black Snake Dawn (Green Ronin, 2007)

== Audiobook ==
In August 2023, Thieves' World was released as an audiobook on Audible, published by Tantor Media and narrated by Jonathan Johns.

== Board game ==
- Sanctuary: Thieves' World (Mayfair Games, 1982).

== Characters ==
The fictional shared universe of Thieves' World has many characters. This alphabetic list includes some characters who appear in the anthologies, the comics and the games.

- Abarsis, Slaughter Priest; high priest of Vashanka. Originally the Sacred Band's commander, Abarsis later became the patron shade of the Sacred Band of Stepsons once Tempus assumed command of the Band upon Abarsis's death.
- Askelon, entelechy of dreams, regent of the seventh sphere, lord of dream and shadow, ruled in Meridian until defeated by Tempus and the Sacred Band of Stepsons in battle.
- Bourne, member of the Prince's Bodyguard
- Cappen Varra, minstrel, lover, and occasional accidental adventurer
- Cime, sorcerer-slayer. Some say she is Tempus's sister, some his beloved. Tempus and she were lovers when young and have shared curses. She was married for a time to Askelon, lord of dream and shadow.
- Critias, at one time second-in-command of Tempus's Stepsons and Sacred Band; Crit is Straton's partner and left-side leader or leftman^{[check spelling]}.
- Dubro the Blackmith, husband of Illyra.
- Enas Yorl, wizard and involuntary shapechanger (he lost a duel with another wizard)
- Enlil, ancient god of storm and wind, patron god of Tempus and the Sacred Band of Stepsons after Vashanka went missing
- Hakiem the storyteller, a street dweller who tells tales and trades information in exchange for coins
- Illyra, half S'danzo seer
- Ischade, necromant and lover of Straton when he commanded the Sacred Band of Stepsons
- Jamie the Red, an adventurer who aids Cappen Varra in rescuing his lover from a magical plane.
- Janni, Niko's right-side partner, killed by the witch Roxanne and made an undead by the necromant Ischade.
- Jarveena, a Yenized scribe who makes a deal with Enas Yorl to foil the assassination of Prince Kadakithis.
- Jihan, wind-charmer and supernatural sprite, daughter of Stormbringer, father of all weather gods; sometime consort of Tempus, with whom she had a child.
- Jubal, ex-gladiator turned slave trader and crime lord
- Kadakithis, Prince-Governor. Sent to Sanctuary by his half-brother the Emperor in a plot to remove him from power.
- Kurd the vivisectionist
- Kama, Tempus's daughter and a member of the Rankan 3rd Commando; she later served in Tempus's forces.
- Lalo the Limner, a painter who receives the "gift" of being able to paint the souls of his subjects
- Lythande, a female wizard of the Blue Star order, masquerading in Sanctuary as a man
- Molin Torchholder, High Priest of Vashanka in Sanctuary
- MoonFlower, S'danzo seer
- Myrtis, owner of Aphrodisia House, Sanctuary's longest-standing brothel, who has a close friendship with Lythande
- Nikodemos, or Niko; most deadly of the Stepsons, Tempus's right-side partner. Always a Sacred Bander, Niko has had several partners, including Janni, who was killed; Randal, the Stepsons' mage, and later Tempus himself. Askelon of Meridian gave him a magical panoply.
- One-Thumb (Lastel), bartender of the Vulgar Unicorn.
- Razkuli, member of the Prince's Bodyguard
- Randal, upwardly-mobile mage with plaguing allergies; at one time, by Tempus's order, rightman of the Stepson and Sacred Bander, Nikodemos. Randal has a kris made for him by the dream-lord, Askelon.
- Roxane, the fearsome Nisibisi witch who loves Nikodemos
- Saliman, Jubal's right-hand man
- The Sacred Band, commanded first by Abarsis and later by Tempus, consisted originally of ten age-weighted couples and became members of Tempus's Stepsons, which initially included thirty single mercenaries and grew to over three hundred and fifty fighters in later novels.
- Shadowspawn (Hanse), a thief who forms an unlikely friendship with Prince Kadakithis. Later retires due to a stroke and trains a young thief named Lone.
- The Stepsons, general term for the paired fighters and individual mercenaries commanded by Tempus; later called The Sacred Band of Stepsons. All Stepsons were not required to be Sacred Band couples; some were single mercenaries or Platonic couples.
- Straton, Critias' right-side partner, onetime commander of the Sacred Band of Stepsons in Sanctuary.
- Tempus, immortal warrior and leader of the Sacred Band and the Stepsons, his legend says he is a demigod.
- Vashanka, Rankan God of War
- Zalbar, Captain of the Prince's Bodyguard
- Zip, revolutionary and terrorist, sometime lover of Kama
