= The Spirit Stones =

Tabletop role-playing game adventure

Cover art by Mitch O'Connell, 1982

The Spirit Stones is an adventure published by FASA in 1982 for Chaosium's fantasy role-playing game Thieves' World, itself based on the popular series of Thieves' World shared world fantasy fiction books created by Robert Lynn Asprin in 1978.

== Description ==
The player characters, all members of the gypsy-like S'Danzo, have been chosen to escort an elderly man carrying three "spirit stones" to the city of Sanctuary and beyond. On the way to Sanctuary, the old man is killed by a man with a scarred face, and the stones stolen. Now the players must enter Sanctuary on a quest to recover the Stones, which have changed hands several times already, and then complete the old man's mission.

The book opens with a description of S'Danzo society, as well as a short explanation of the role-playing rules used in the Thieves' World role-playing game.

== Publication history ==
The Spirit Stones is a 44-page saddle-stitched softcover book written by Bill Fawcett and Lynn Abbey, with interior art by Jim Clouse, floor plans by Jordan Weisman, and cover art by Mitch O'Connell. The 1982 book was the second Thieves' World adventure published by FASA.

== Reception ==
In the February 1983 edition of White Dwarf (Issue #38), Oliver Dickinson thought the "plots and sub-plots have been carefully thought out and all possibilities seem to be well covered", and that "presentation is reasonably good". But he also commented that "each page has a sprinkling of misprints and minor errors and the language is sometimes clumsy." He also noted some variance with the rules set out in the Thieves' World RPG, such as the relative coinage values of copper, silver, and gold coins. He concluded by giving the book an average rating of 7 out of 10, saying, "All in all, these look like testing and enjoyable adventures."

Paul Ryan O'Connor reviewed The Spirit Stones for Different Worlds magazine and stated that "In summation, I strongly urge against the purchase of The Spirit Stones. For someone already owning Traitor, the reproduction presented here makes purchases of The Spirit Stones nearly a redundancy. For someone not owning Traitor, the adventure could prove difficult to play. For anyone, this product is not worth the cover price. And for a lover of games, the wasted potential of this product is a cold slap in the face."

== Other recognition ==
A copy of The Spirit Stones is part of the collection at The Strong National Museum of Play (item 110.32760).
