= Tempus =

Tempus is a Latin word meaning time and a Finnish, Swedish and German word meaning grammatical tense. It may also refer to:

Tempus, Roman name for Caerus, a mythical son of Zeus, and personification of Kairos (see also: Chronos)

== Arts, entertainment, and media ==
=== Television ===
- "Tempus, Anyone?", 1996 episode of Lois & Clark: The New Adventures of Superman
- "Tempus", 2011 episode of Sanctuary (season 4)

=== Other arts, entertainment, and media ===
- Tempus (novel), 1987 novel by Janet Morris
- Tempus, in music, as opposed to prolation
- Tempus, 2008 poem by Giulio Angioni

== Businesses and organizations ==
- Tempus Publishing, an imprint of UK publishing company The History Press
- Tempus Sport, a British motorsport team
- TEMPUS (Trans-European Mobility Scheme for University Studies), a European Union program

== Characters ==
- Tempus (DC Comics), in several episodes of the television series Lois & Clark: The New Adventures of Superman
- Tempus, a deity in the Dungeons & Dragons Forgotten Realms fictional universe
- Tempus, a demon that could manipulate time in the television series Charmed; portrayed by David Carradine
- Tempus, the fictional commander of The Sacred Band of Stepsons series of fantasy novels
- Tempus, a Parrot-Ox in Edward Einhorn's novel Paradox in Oz
- Tempus (comics), two Marvel Comics characters

== See also ==
- CB Tempus or Club Baloncesto Tempus, a professional basketball club based in Madrid, Spain
- Tempus fugit (disambiguation)
