= Megacorporation =

Massive, monopolistic corporation active in multiple markets

A megacorporation is a form of corporate entity differentiated by its global scale of activities and broad scope of influence, which exceed even those of a multinational corporation (MNC). They are often characterised by monopolistic control over multiple markets—and sometimes even trade in general—and the exercising of quasi-governmental powers, either via control of the government (such as through a private militia or extensive corruption) or through the governing of their own sovereign territory.

Although megacorporations are most frequently a trope of science fiction (particularly the sub-genre of cyberpunk), historical examples have been proposed, including the Dutch East India Company, the (English and later British) East India Company and the Hudson's Bay Company. The term has also been applied to the members of Big Tech, such as Alphabet Inc. (Google), Facebook, and Amazon.

== Etymology and definition ==
Power, in Case's world, meant corporate power. The zaibatsus, the multinationals that shaped the course of human history, had transcended old barriers. Viewed as organisms, they had attained a kind of immortality.

— William Gibson, Neuromancer

The term was coined by the economist Alfred Eichner in his 1976 book The Megacorp and Oligopoly: Micro Foundations of Macro Dynamics. His definition posited three characteristics: weak shareholder oversight of management, standardized production across plants, and participation in an oligopoly that provides economic rent. The concept was adapted and popularized by the writer William Gibson in cyberpunk literature, notably in his 1984 science fiction novel Neuromancer, though Gibson himself did not use the label directly.

In Megacorporation: The Infinite Times of Alphabet (2021), Glen Whelan differentiates the megacorporation from other types of corporation by the relative scale and scope of its actions, as well as more specific characteristics that include monopoly, corporate social responsibility concerns, political-economic hybridity, and existential impacts.

== In science fiction ==
=== Literature ===
Such organizations as a staple of science fiction long predate cyberpunk, appearing in the works of writers such as Thea von Harbou (Metropolis, 1927), Frederik Pohl and Cyril M. Kornbluth (The Space Merchants, 1952), Robert A. Heinlein (Citizen of the Galaxy, 1957), Philip K. Dick (Do Androids Dream of Electric Sheep?, 1968), Robert Asprin (The Cold Cash War, 1977), and Andre Norton (the Solar Queen novels). The explicit use of the term in the Traveller science fiction roleplaying game from 1977 predates Gibson's use of it. The transnationals, and later metanationals in Kim Stanley Robinson's Mars Trilogy are an example of mega corporations that exceed most countries in political influence.

=== Film ===
In the Alien film franchise the unscrupulous megacorporation Weyland-Yutani, which seeks to profit from the aliens’ acidic blood, controls much of Earth and the solar system.

In the animated Pixar film WALL-E, the megacorporation Buy n Large has completely supplanted every planetary government.

In the Avatar series of films, the Resources Development Administration (RDA) is a megacorporation that outmatches most governments in wealth, influence, and military power. The RDA has monopolized ownership of all extraterrestrial colonies and assets, granted in perpetuity by an international committee.

=== Video games ===
In the sci-fi strategy game Stellaris, players can choose to control a megacorporation that has consumed all aspects of their alien government, with variable policies such as indentured servitude, media conglomerates, or even employee resurrection.

In the video game The Outer Worlds, many megacorps purchase the rights to solar systems from Earth governments. Corporate colonies, being lightyears away from government influence, are effectively governed by their parent companies, with employment acting as citizenship.

In the Doom video game franchise, the Union Aerospace Corporation (UAC)—a multi-planetary conglomerate—is often referred to as a megacorporation.

In Cyberpunk 2077, several megacorporations (most notably Arasaka and Militech) are multinational entities that dominate nearly every aspect of society, from politics to the economy. These corporations are so powerful that they function almost like states unto themselves, exerting control over vast territories and influencing the daily lives of the populace. They often operate outside or above the reach of traditional governments, often exhibit cutthroat, morally bankrupt practices, driven by a relentless pursuit of profit and power. Ethics are secondary, and corporate warfare—both economic and physical—can result in the deaths of thousands, if not millions. These corporations will often engage in sabotage, espionage, or even orchestrate political coups to secure their interests. They also manipulate public opinion through media and control over information, ensuring their image remains pristine while their unethical activities remain hidden.

In the Titanfall franchise, which contains Apex Legends, a megacorporation named Interstellar Manufacturing Corporation [IMC] dominates the entire mining and manufacturing industry across the Frontier (galaxy) based on Earth, well as maintaining private military contractors to suppress dissidents. According to the Protagonist Jack Cooper, as long as they find a profitable resource reserve in a planet, it forces their residents out of land, destroys their environment, and kills anyone who dares to resist, to maximize profits.

In the indie game Stardew Valley, the Joja Corporation seems to have monopolized the entire markets of retail, logistics, mining, manufacturing, and emergency healthcare.

== In real life ==
Although there are more fictional examples, certain real-life corporations, such as colonial-era chartered companies and zaibatsu, have been proposed to meet the definition of a megacorporation.

=== Historic ===
- The private Dutch East India Company operated 40 warships and had 10,000 private soldiers to monitor its far-reaching spice empire.
- In its heyday from 1757 until 1858, the English and then British East India Company exercised military power and administrative responsibility over most of modern-day India, Pakistan and Bangladesh; the total of its armed forces—260,000 soldiers—was at times twice the size of the British Army, and it accounted for half of the world's trade in certain commodities during the mid-1700s and early 1800s.
- In the French colonial empire, the Hudson's Bay Company was once the world's largest landowner, exercising legal control and a trading monopoly on its territory, known as Rupert's Land, which consisted of 15% of the North American land mass.

=== Modern ===
Today, many countries have competition laws (also known as antitrust laws) to prevent real-life corporations from having mega-corporation characteristics. On the other hand, some countries protect a certain industry deemed important by mandating that only a single company, usually state-owned, can operate in it; this is called state capitalism. An example of the latter is Saudi Arabia, which gains the majority of its government revenues through its mega-corporation Saudi Aramco.

In the 2006 book The Wal-Mart Effect, Charles Fishman describes the American multinational retail company Walmart as "[in] a whole class of megacorporations of which Wal-Mart is just the most extreme, vivid example". The American multinational technology conglomerate Alphabet Inc. (the parent holding company of Google) has also been described as a megacorporation, as have other members of Big Tech such as Meta (Facebook) and Amazon.

== See also ==
- Company town, a settlement where amenities are supplied by the employer
- Corporate warfare
- Corporatocracy, an economic, political and judicial system controlled or influenced by business corporations or corporate interests
- Chaebol
- Evil corporation, a corporation that violates ethical and legal codes
- Keiretsu
- List of largest corporations
