= Sanctuary (board game) =

Board game

Cover art by Walter Velex, 1982

Sanctuary is a board game published by Mayfair Games in 1982 that is based on Thieves' World.

== Description ==
Sanctuary is a board game designed by Bill Fawcett for one to six players set in the fictional city of Sanctuary popularized in the Thieves' World line of shared universe anthologies edited by Robert Asprin and Lynn Abbey. The game comes with the following components:

- a 4-piece board depicting a map of Sanctuary
- ten plastic tokens
- cardboard pieces representing silver coins
- two decks of cards
- a rulebook
- a ten-sided die and two six-sided dice
- a box with cover art by Walter Velex

The rulebook begins with a short introductory tale describing the arrival of Kadakithis, the new city governor, and his personal security guards, the Hell Hounds.

== Gameplay ==
There are three ways to play:

1. In the game for 2–5 players, each player takes the role of a thief in Sanctuary. Responding to rumours, they travel to various parts of the city, avoiding guards in order to steal goods. The first player to collect 300 silver pieces and hide them in their secret cache wins the game.
2. In the game for six players, five players are thieves, and the sixth player takes on the role of Kadikithis, directing his Hell Hounds in an attempt to prevent robberies from taking place.
3. In the solitaire game, the player is Kadakithis, and tries to enforce the city's laws over the thieves' activities.

The games for 2–5 players and 2–6 players offer optional Advanced rules, including

- the ability to hire thugs
- the ability to "case the joint" (do reconnaissance) before the attempted theft
- subdivision of thefts into burglaries, muggings and picking pockets

== Reception ==
In Issue 53 of the British wargaming magazine Perfidious Albion, Geoffrey Barnard commented, "The game is not bad actually, and its presentation is pretty damn spiffing." Barnard concluded, "it is one of those games that really has the spirit of the book it seeks to simulate."

In the August 1983 edition of White Dwarf (Issue #44), Charles Vasey admired the "startling" box art by Walter Velez, and called the artwork of the components "less good but full of feeling." This was the first time that Vasey, a wargamer, had seen a multi-piece "jigsaw" board, and he thought it worked far better than the standard folding maps of the period, saying, "It's time for wargamers to lobby their manufacturers!" Overall, Vasey called the game "Bright and bouncy, it reminds me a little of one of the dafter games which still retains my loyalty - Heads & Feds, a junk game of dope dealing. I should add, mega-points here, you get little silvery coins to play with in the game just like at play-school!"

Two issues later, in the October 1983 edition of White Dwarf (Issue #46), Alan Paull also thought the jigsaw-type board was "an excellent idea, which makes sure that the map is both easy to pack in the box and easy to set up on a playing surface without any annoying wrinkles or ridges." Paull also liked the component artwork, calling it "of a good standard, though the backs of the cards, as in all Mayfair games, are plain except for the Mayfair logo." He thought the game was a good family game, saying, " "Sanctuary will appeal to those seeking an uncomplicated game for all age ranges from twelve years old upwards. The rules are not long, and neither are they difficult to understand." Paull concluded "Sanctuary is a good buy for the family," and gave the game an average rating of 7 out of 10.

Matthew J. Costello reviewed Sanctuary for Fantasy Gamer magazine and stated that "Sanctuary is a great boardgame. It lends itself superbly to backstabbing as players quickly become double-dealing thieves, Victory can seem very close and then slip through your fingers as you're hauled away to the dungeon, Rules are easily picked up — your non-gamer friends and relations will love this game."

== Reviews ==
- Asimov's Science Fiction v7 n8 (1983 08)
- Asimov's Science Fiction v7 n13 (1983 12 Mid)
- Isaac Asimov's Science Fiction Magazine
- 1983 Games 100
- Adventure Gaming #13
