= Mr. Beat (disambiguation) =

Mr. Beat (born 1981) is an American internet personality.

Mr. Beat may also refer to:

- "Mr. Beat", a 2016 song by King Gizzard & the Lizard Wizard from Nonagon Infinity
- Mr. Beat, a 1965 album by Bill Black's Combo
- "Mr. Beat", a storyline in the comic book series Elfquest

== See also ==
- Beat (name)
- Mr Beat the Road, mixtape by BossMan Dlow
- Mr. Beast (disambiguation)
