= Jefferson P. Swycaffer =

American writer

Jefferson Putnam Swycaffer (born 1956) is an American writer best known for his "Traveller-like" science fiction who lives in San Diego.

== Career ==
Jefferson Swycaffer started his writing career in 1979 at the age of 23 with "At the Sign of the Brass Beast", a swords & sorcery short story published in Andrew J. Offutt's anthology Swords Against Darkness IV. The same year, his short story "A Typical Night in the Life of Nine Ordinary (?) People" was published in the December 1979 edition of Dragon (Issue #32).

In 1984, seven years after the publication of the popular science fiction role-playing game Traveller, Swycaffer wrote Not in Our Stars, a science fiction novel published by Avon Books that used themes and tropes used in Traveller. Swycaffer did not have a license from Game Designers Workshop to publish Traveller material, so he did not use Traveller's "Charted Space" locations or any personalities mentioned in the game. Instead, he set the novel in an area he called the Concordat of Archive. He followed this in 1985 with two more "Traveller-like" Concordat novels (The Universal Prey and Become the Hunted), and a collection of Concordat short stories in 1986 (The Praesidium of Archive), all published by Avon.

In 1988, Swycaffer moved to New Infinities Productions to publish three books in the Tales of the Concordat series.

Swycaffer then left the "Traveller-like" universe to write Warsprite (1990), and War of the Futures (1991), both published by TSR.

Best in Show: Fifteen Years of Outstanding Furry Fiction includes a Swycaffer short story.

== Critical reception ==
In the November 1979 edition of Science Fiction and Fantasy Book Review (Vol. 1, No. 10), David Dvorkin reviewed Andrew J. Offutt's anthology Swords Against Darkness IV, and found most of the short stories except the one by Swycaffer to be not very good. He wrote, "Yet another collection of original heroic fantasy stories... Only one, 'At the Sign of the Brass Beast', by Jeff P. Swycaffer succeeeds fully."

Game historian Shannon Appelcline reviewed Swycaffer's fourth book, The Praesidium of Archive, for the December 2011 issue of Freelance Traveller, and found that, compared to Swycaffer's first three novels, the writing in this novel finally "reaches a well-polished and professional level", although he noted "Swycaffer still seems too intent on men and women working together falling into obsessive love. I also at times find his stories overly philosophical, which was one of the things that made his earlier books hard to read at times." Appelgate concluded, "The Praesidium of Archive is a well-written and interesting novel of a Traveller-like universe... Though the framing structure is weak, overall The Praesidium of Archive comes across as the best of the four Concordat books published by Avon. As such I've given it a '4' [out of 5] for both Style and Substance."

== Other reviews ==
- "Review of Praesidium", Joy Hibbert, Paperback Inferno (Issue 61)

== Bibliography ==
=== Series ===
==== Concordat ====
1. Not in Our Stars (1984)
2. The Universal Prey (1985)
3. Become the Hunted (1985)
4. The Praesidium of Archive (1986)

==== Tales of the Concordat ====
1. The Empire's Legacy (1988)
2. Voyage of the Planetslayer (1988)
3. Revolt and Rebirth (1988)

=== Novels ===
- Warsprite (1990)
- Web of Futures (1991)
