= List of Elfquest publications =

Elfquest is a comic book series created by Wendy and Richard Pini, first published in 1978. The comics and related works of prose fiction tell the story of the elves of the World of Two Moons, particularly the elfin tribe called the Wolfriders.

Elfquest was first published in the short-lived Fantasy Quarterly anthology in February, 1978; after one appearance there, it was published by Warp Graphics as a stand-alone series which began with issue #2 (the Fantasy Quarterly material was later republished as issue #1). Starting in 1992, it branched into multiple titles, many of which were re-absorbed into a single title which ran from 1996-1999. In 2003 Warp Graphics, after publishing a few single issues and graphic novels, licensed the publishing rights to DC Comics. They published reprints in manga-like graphic novel format, as well as new material. In 2003 DC Comics also began re-releasing the original collections in re-colored hardcover format. These are considered by the authors themselves to be "the definitive version" of the material. In 2013 Dark Horse Comics acquired the publishing license for both reprint and new material.

== Original material by publication date ==
This list includes only the first publication date for a given publication. It does not include reprint material.

=== Comics ===
- 1978: Fantasy Quarterly #1 (anthology)
- From 1978-1992, Elfquest was published as a series of consecutive titles.
  - 1978-1984: Elfquest: The Original Quest - 20 story issues plus one "extra" issue (#21); #1 reprints the story from Fantasy Quarterly #1; #21 was a "bonus" issue containing fan letters about the end of the quest, background sketches, published reviews, editorials, and other behind the scenes material.
  - 1980: Epic Illustrated #1: anthology work containing new Elfquest short, "Homespun" (not originally identified as an Elfquest story, but its characters subsequently reappear in the Original Quest).
  - 1986: Warp Graphics Annual, containing "Courage, By Any Other Name..."
  - 1986-1988: Siege at Blue Mountain - 8 issues
  - 1988-1990: Kings of the Broken Wheel - 9 issues
- In 1992, the Elfquest series split into several concurrently-running series.
  - 1992-1996: Hidden Years - 30 issues (29 numbered issues plus issue #9.5)
  - 1992-1996: New Blood - 35 issues
  - 1993-1995: Blood of Ten Chiefs - 20 issues
  - 1993-1994 WaveDancers I (a.k.a. Original WaveDancers) - 6 issues, created by Julie Ditrich, Bruce Love and Jozef Szekeres, also known as BMP (Black Mermaid Productions).
    - Not considered canon. This story's non-canon status may be due to a contractual dispute between its creators and the Pinis.
  - 1993: New Blood Summer Special - 1 issue
  - 1994: Elfquest Bedtime Stories - anthology work containing several new shorts.
  - 1994-1996: Shards - 16 issues
  - 1994-1996: The Rebels - 12 issues
  - 1994-1996: Jink - 12 issues
  - 1995-1996: Kahvi - 6 issues
  - 1995-1996: Two-Spear - 5 issues
  - 1996: WaveDancers II Special - 1 issue
- In 1996, the Elfquest lines were merged into a single monthly anthology comic containing several storylines:
  - 1996: Metamorphosis - 1 issue
  - 1996-1999: Elfquest II - 33 issues, containing the following storylines:
    - "Dreamtime" (Elfquest II #4-7, 9-13, 15-16, 18)
    - "Fire-Eye" (Metamorphosis, Elfquest II #1-7, 9-14, 16-17, 19-22
    - "Futurequest" (Metamorphosis, Elfquest II #10-11, 13-15, 17, 19-20, 22)
    - "Leetah's Song" (Elfquest II #32)
    - "Mr. Beat" (Elfquest II #9, 27)
    - "Return to Centaur" (an Elfquest - Xanth crossover story) (Elfquest II #19, 23-24, 28, 30-31)
    - "Rogue's Curse" (Metamorphosis, Elfquest II #1, 3, 8-10, 12-13, 15-17, 20, 22, 24-26, 28-30)
    - "Tiny Toons" (Elfquest II #16, 25, 27)
    - "Wavedancers" (Metamorphosis, Elfquest II #1-2, 5, 21, 23-24, 27-28, 30-31)
    - "Wild Hunt" (Metamorphosis, Elfquest II #1-7, 10-12, 14-15, 18, 20-30, 32-33)
    - "Windkin" (Elfquest II #4, 18)
    - "Wolfrider!" (Elfquest II #19, 21, 23, 25, 27, 29, 31, 33)
    - "Worldpool" (Elfquest II #2, 3, 4, 17, 18, 26, 31)
- Several mini-series and one-shots were also published during the run of the ElfQuest anthology:
  - 1997: Kings Cross - 2 issues
  - 1997: Worldpool - 1 issue
  - 1998: Frank Frazetta Fantasy Illustrated #1: anthology work containing new Elfquest short, "Jury".
  - 1998: Frank Frazetta Fantasy Illustrated #4: anthology work containing new Elfquest short, "Rogue's Curse".
  - 1998: Elfquest: The First Twenty Years: anthology work containing new Elfquest short, "The Heart's Way" and reprints of "Homespun" and "Courage, By Any Other Name".
- After the Elfquest anthology comic came to an end in 1999, new material continued to be released in the form of one-issue stories, or as new material added to the Reader's Collections (which were primarily reprints of previously published storylines):
  - 1999: Wolfrider - reader's collection containing the conclusion to the storyline begun in Elfquest II.
  - 2001: Wolfshadow Summer Special - 1 issue
  - 2001: Recognition Summer Special - 1 issue
  - 2002: In All But Blood - reader's collection containing the two new stories "Troll Games and Soul Names" and "Full Circle" and reprinting "Wolfshadow" and "The Heart's Way".
- In 2003, Elfquest was licensed to DC Comics. Since then, new material has been released.
  - 2004: The Searcher and the Sword (graphic novel)
  - 2006: The Discovery - 4 issues
- Since 2013, new comics as well as reprints have been published by Dark Horse Comics.
  - 2013: The Final Quest Special (2013)
  - 2014–2018: The Final Quest - 24 issues
  - 2019–2020: Stargazer's Hunt - 4 issues

=== Prose fiction ===
- 1984: Journey to Sorrow's End , a novelization of the first story arc
- 1986: The Blood of Ten Chiefs, an anthology edited by Richard Pini, Robert Asprin and Lynn Abbey
  - "Pendulum" - Richard Pini
  - "Coming of Age" - Lynn Abbey
  - "Plague of Allos" - Piers Anthony
  - "Swift-Spear" - Mark C. Perry & C. J. Cherryh
  - "Tale of the Snowbeast" - Janny Wurts
  - "The Deer Hunters" - Allen L. Wold
  - "Tanner's Dream" - Nancy Springer
  - "The Spirit Quest" - Diana L. Paxson
  - "Lessons in Passing" - Robert Lynn Asprin
  - "Night Hunt" - Diane Carey
- 1988: Wolfsong ("Blood of Ten Chiefs Volume 2"), an anthology edited by Richard Pini, Robert Asprin and Lynn Abbey
  - "Colors" - Richard Pini
  - "Love and Memory" - Lynn Abbey
  - "Songshaper" - Nancy Springer
  - "The Search" - Christine Dewees & C. J. Cherryh
  - "Genesis" - Richard Pini, Lynn Abbey, & Marcus Leahy
  - "Dreamsinger's Tale" - Janny Wurts
  - "Summer Tag" - Allen L. Wold
  - "Stormlight's Way" - Nancy Springer
  - "A Very Good Year for Dreamberries" - Diana L. Paxson
- 1989: Winds of Change ("Blood of Ten Chiefs Volume 3"), an anthology edited by Richard Pini
  - "Ice" - Lynn Abbey
  - "Wind Warning" - Katharine Eliska Kimbriel
  - "A Friend in Need" - Mercedes Lackey
  - "Song's End" - Janny Wurts
  - "The Flood" - Allen L. Wold
  - "At the Oak's Root" - Nancy Springer
  - "The Fire Song" - Diana L. Paxson
  - "Coyote" - Richard Pini
  - "The Phantom of the Berry Patch" - Mercedes Lackey & Richard Pini
- 1990: Against the Wind ("Blood of Ten Chiefs Volume 4"), an anthology edited by Richard Pini
  - "The Good Summer" - Lynn Abbey
  - "Court and Chase" - Katharine Eliska Kimbriel
  - "Ties that Bind" - Mercedes Lackey
  - "Season of Sorrows" - Heather Gladney & Janny Wurts
  - "Firstborn" - Allen L. Wold
  - "Howl for Eldolil" - Nancy Springer
  - "The Changeling" - Diana L. Paxson
  - "Hero Worship" - Len Wein & Deni Loubert
- 1994: Dark Hours ("Blood of Ten Chiefs Volume 5"), edited by Richard Pini - short story anthology:
  - "In Memory Green" - Alice Cascorbi & Richard Pini
  - "Starting Over" - Lynn Abbey
  - "Personal Challenge" - Katharine Eliska Kimbriel
  - "Riders of the Storm" - Mercedes Lackey
  - "The Naming of Stonefist" - Allen L. Wold
  - "Finder" - Nancy Springer
  - "Turnings" - Diana L. Paxson
  - "The Long Hunt" - Len Wein & Bill Rotsler
  - "Five-Finger Exercise" - Esther M. Friesner
- 1996: The Quest Begins - novelization of second story arc
- 1996: A Gift of Her Own - children's book
- 1997: Captives of Blue Mountain - novelization of third story arc

### Notes ###

The contents of a sixth volume of Blood of Ten Chiefs, entitled Hunter's Dawn were written, but was not published. Elfquest volume 2 #26, published in mid-1998, contained excerpts of stories by Mercedes Lackey, Katherine E. Kimbriel, Allen L. Wold, Nancy Springer, Diana L. Paxson. and Esther Friesner.

=== Nonfiction and RPG game material ===
- 1981: The ElfQuest Gatherum #1 - background material book
- 1984: Elfquest Roleplaying Game: Elfbook & Worldbook
- 1985: Elfquest Roleplaying Game: The Elfquest Companion
- 1988: The ElfQuest Gatherum #2 - background material book
- 1997: The Big ElfQuest Gatherum - background material book (reprints from ##1 and 2 plus new material).
- 1998: Elfquest: The First Twenty Years
- 1999: The Wolfrider's Guide to the World of ElfQuest - background material book

== Graphic albums / reprints ==
- Donning/Starblaze (color)
  - Elfquest Book 1 (Elfquest I #1-5) (1981)
  - Elfquest Book 2 (Elfquest I #6-10) (1982)
  - Elfquest Book 3 (Elfquest I #11-15) (1983)
  - Elfquest Book 4 (Elfquest I #16-20) (1984)
- Elfquest (Marvel - Epic Comics imprint)
  - ElfQuest #1-#32 (reprint of Elfquest I #1-20) (1985-1988)
- The Complete ElfQuest (Father Tree Press) (recolored)
  - Vol. 1 - "Fire and Flight" (Elfquest I #1-5) (1988)
  - Vol. 2 - "The Forbidden Grove" (Elfquest I #6-10) (1988)
  - Vol. 3 - "Captives of Blue Mountain" (Elfquest I #11-15) (1988)
  - Vol. 4 - "Quest's End" (Elfquest I #16-20) (1988)
  - Vol. 5 - "Siege at Blue Mountain" #1-4 (1988)
  - Vol. 6 - "The Secret of Two-Edge" (Siege at Blue Mountain #5-8) (1989)
  - Vol. 7 - "The Cry From Beyond" (Kings of the Broken Wheel #1-4) (1991)
  - Vol. 8 - "Kings of the Broken Wheel" #5-9 (1992)
  - Hidden Years #1-5 (1992)
  - Vol. 9 - "Rogue's Challenge" (Hidden Years #6-9.5) (1994)
  - New Blood #1-5 (1993)
  - Bedtime Stories (New Blood #1, 7, 10) (1994)
- Reader's Collections (Wolfrider Books) (black and white)
  - RC Vol. 1 - "Fire and Flight" (Elfquest I #1-5) (1998)
  - RC Vol. 2 - "The Forbidden Grove" (Elfquest I #6-10) (1998)
  - RC Vol. 3 - "Captives of Blue Mountain" (Elfquest I #11-15) (1998)
  - RC Vol. 4 - "Quest's End" (Elfquest I #16-20) (1998)
  - RC Vol. 5 - "Siege at Blue Mountain" (Siege at Blue Mountain #1-4) (1998)
  - RC Vol. 6 - "The Secret of Two-Edge" (Siege at Blue Mountain #5-8) (1998)
  - RC Vol. 7 - "The Cry From Beyond" (Kings of the Broken Wheel #1-4) (1998)
  - RC Vol. 8 - "Kings of the Broken Wheel" #5-9 (1998)
  - RC Vol. 8a - "Dreamtime" (Elfquest II #4-7, 9, 11-13, 15-18) (1998)
  - RC Vol. 8b - "In All But Blood" (2002)
  - RC Vol. 9 - "Rogue's Curse" (Elfquest II #1, 3, 8-10, 12-13, 15-17, 20, 22, 24-26) (2000)
  - RC Vol. 9a - "Wolfrider" (Elfquest II #19, 21, 23, 25, 27, 29, 31, 33) (1999)
  - RC Vol. 9b - "Blood of Ten Chiefs" #1-7, 10-11 (1999)
  - RC Vol. 9c - "Kahvi" (Kahvi #1-6, Two-Spear #1-5) (2000)
  - RC Vol. 9d - "Chief's Howl" (Blood of Ten Chiefs #12-15, 18-20) (2001)
  - RC Vol. 10 - "Shards" (Hidden Years #8-15) (1998)
  - RC Vol. 11 - "Legacy" (Hidden Years #16-22) (1998)
  - RC Vol. 11a - "Huntress" (Hidden Years #23-29) (1999)
  - RC Vol. 11b - "The Wild Hunt" (Elfquest II #1-7, 10, 12, 15, 18, 20-22) (2000)
  - RC Vol. 11c - "Shadowstalker" (Elfquest II #23-30) (2000)
  - RC Vol. 12 - "Ascent" (Shards #1-8) (1999)
  - RC Vol. 12a - "Reunion" (Shards #9-16) (1999)
  - RC Vol. 13 - The Rebels #1-6 (1998)
  - RC Vol. 13a - "Skyward Shadow" (The Rebels #7-12) (1999)
  - RC Vol. 14 - "Jink!" (Jink #1-6) (1999)
  - RC Vol. 14a - "Mindcoil" (Jink #7-12) (1999)
  - RC Vol. 15 - "Forevergreen" (New Blood #11-19) (1999)
  - RC Vol. 15a - "Dream's End" (New Blood #20-27) (2001)
  - RC Vol. 15b - "Phoenix" (New Blood #28-35) (2002)
  - RC Vol. 16 - "WaveDancers" (WaveDancers Special #1; Elfquest II #1-2, 5, 21, 23-24, 27-28, 30-31) (2000)
  - RC Vol. ? - "Worldpool" (New Blood #8, 9; Elfquest II #2-3, 16, 17, 25, 31; King's Cross #1-2) (2000)
- Elfquest Archives (DC Comics) (recolored again)
  - Volume One (Elfquest I #1-5 (recolored), short The Heart's Way) (2003)
  - Volume Two (Elfquest I #6-10 (recolored), short Homespun (reprinted in chronological sequence with the main EQ story for the first time)) (2005)
  - Volume Three (Elfquest I #11-15 (recolored), A Day in the Lives (one-panel humorous cartoons from the original comics), Elfquest Portfolio (7 black and white plates, 1980)) (2005)
  - Volume Four (Elfquest I #16-20 (recolored)) (2007)
- Elfquest (DC Comics) (black and white, manga-format)
  - Wolfrider volume 1 (Blood of Ten Chiefs #2, Elfquest II #19, 21, 23, 25, 27, Hidden Years #5, Elfquest II #29, 31, New Blood '93 Summer Special) (2003)
  - Wolfrider volume 2 (Elfquest II #33, Blood of Ten Chiefs #19, "Courage, by Any Other Name..." from Warp Graphics Annual 1, Blood of Ten Chiefs #10-11, Reader's Collection Wolfrider!, "Troll Games and Soul Names" from Reader's Collection In All But Blood) (2003)
  - The Grand Quest volume 1 (Elfquest I #1-5) (2004)
  - The Grand Quest volume 2 (Elfquest I #5-8, short "The Heart's Way" from 20th Anniversary Special) (2004)
  - The Grand Quest volume 3 (Elfquest I #8-11) (2004)
  - The Grand Quest volume 4 (Elfquest I #11-15) (2004)
  - The Grand Quest volume 5 (Elfquest I #15-18) (2004)
  - The Grand Quest volume 6 (Elfquest I #18-20) (2004)
  - The Grand Quest volume 7 (Siege at Blue Mountain #1-3) (2005)
  - The Grand Quest volume 8 (Siege at Blue Mountain #3-5) (2005)
  - The Grand Quest volume 9 (Siege at Blue Mountain #6-8) (2005)
  - The Grand Quest volume 10 (Kings of the Broken Wheel #1-3) (2005)
  - The Grand Quest volume 11 (Kings of the Broken Wheel #5-7, short "The Jury" from Frank Frazetta Fantasy Illustrated #1) (2005)
  - The Grand Quest volume 12 (Kings of the Broken Wheel #8-11)
  - The Grand Quest volume 13 (Elfquest II #4-7, 9, 11-13, 15-18) (2006)
  - The Grand Quest volume 14 ("Right of Passage" and "Rogue's Challenge") (2006)
- Elfquest (DC Comics) color trade paperback
  - Elfquest: Discovery (2006)
- Dark Horse Books: The Complete Elfquest (black and white / color paperbacks)
  - The Complete Elfquest Volume 1 (Elfquest I #1-20) (2014)
  - The Complete Elfquest Volume 2 (Siege at Blue Mountain #1-8, Kings of the Broken Wheel #1-9) (2015)
  - The Complete Elfquest Volume 3 (Dreamtime and Hidden Years #1-5, 8-9½) (2016)
  - The Complete Elfquest Volume 4 (Hidden Years #10-15 and Shards #1-16) (2017)
  - The Complete Elfquest Volume 5 (Hidden Years #16-29 and Wild Hunt) (2018)
  - The Complete Elfquest Volume 6 (Wolfrider #1-12, Homespun, Troll Games and Soul Names, The Heart's Way, The Jury, Wolfshadow, Full Circle, The Searcher and the Sword, The Discovery) (2019)
  - The Complete Elfquest Volume 7 (The Final Quest #1-24, B&W) (2020)
  - The Complete Elfquest Volume 8 (Jink #1-12, Rebels #1-12, Stargazer's Hunt GN) (2025)
- Dark Horse Books: Elfquest: The Final Quest (color paperbacks)
  - Elfquest: The Final Quest Volume 1 (2015) (Final Quest Special, issues #1-6)
  - Elfquest: The Final Quest Volume 2 (2016) (issues #7-12)
  - Elfquest: The Final Quest Volume 3 (2017) (issues #13-18)
  - Elfquest: The Final Quest Volume 4 (2018) (issues #19-24)
- Dark Horse Books: Elfquest: Stargazer's Hunt (color paperback)
  - Elfquest: Stargazer's Hunt Volume 1 (2021) (issues #1–4)
  - Elfquest: Stargazer's Hunt Volume 2 (2022) (issues #5–8)
  - Elfquest: Stargazer's Hunt Complete Edition (2023) (issues #1-8)
