= Swords Against Darkness III =

1978 anthology edited by Andrew J. Offutt

- Cover of the first edition.
- Editor: Andrew J. Offutt
- Cover artist: Greg Theakston
- Language: English
- Series: Swords Against Darkness
- Genre: Fantasy
- Publisher: Zebra Books
- Publication date: 1978
- Publication place: United States
- Media type: Print (paperback)
- Pages: 288
- ISBN: 0-89083-339-7
- OCLC: 3929169
- Preceded by: Swords Against Darkness II
- Followed by: Swords Against Darkness IV

Swords Against Darkness III is an anthology of fantasy stories, edited by Andrew J. Offutt, the third in a series of five anthologies of the same name. It was first published in paperback by Zebra Books in March 1978.

== Summary ==
The book collects thirteen short stories and novelettes, one poem and one essay by various fantasy authors, together with a foreword by Offutt.

== Contents ==
- "Foreword" (Andrew J. Offutt)
- "The Pit of Wings" (Ramsey Campbell)
- "The Sword of Spartacus" (Richard L. Tierney)
- "Servitude" (Wayne Hooks)
- "Descales' Skull" (David C. Smith)
- "In the Balance" (Tanith Lee)
- "Tower of Darkness" (David Madison)
- "The Mantichore" (David Drake)
- "Revenant" (poem) (Kathleen Resch)
- "Rite of Kings" (Jon DeCles)
- "The Mating Web" (Robert E. Vardeman)
- "The Guest of Dzinganji" (Manly Wade Wellman)
- "The Hag" (Darrell Schweitzer)
- "A Kingdom Won" (Geo W. Proctor)
- "Swordslinger" (M. A. Washil)
- "On Thud and Blunder" (essay) (Poul Anderson)

== Reception ==
The anthology was reviewed by Darrell Schweitzer in Science Fiction Review, July 1978, Mark Mansell in Science Fiction Review, November/December 1978, and Lin Carter in The Year's Best Fantasy Stories: 5 (1980).

== Awards ==
The book placed tenth in the 1979 Locus Poll Award for Best Anthology.
