= Swords Against Darkness =

1977 anthology edited by Andrew J. Offutt

- Cover of Swords Against Darkness
- Author: edited by Andrew J. Offutt
- Cover artist: Frank Frazetta
- Language: English
- Series: Swords Against Darkness
- Genre: Fantasy short stories
- Publisher: Zebra Books
- Publication date: 1977
- Publication place: United States
- Media type: Print (Paperback)
- Pages: 288 pp.
- ISBN: 0-89083-293-5
- OCLC: 3595933
- Followed by: Swords Against Darkness II

Swords Against Darkness is an anthology of fantasy stories, edited by Andrew J. Offutt, the first in a series of five anthologies of the same name. It was first published in paperback by Zebra Books in February 1977, and reprinted by the same publisher in April 1990.

== Summary ==
The book collects nine short stories and novelettes by various fantasy authors, with a foreword by Offutt.

== Contents ==
- "Foreword" (Andrew J. Offutt)
- "Nekht Semerkeht" (Robert E. Howard and Andrew J. Offutt)
- "The Tale of Hauk" (Poul Anderson)
- "The Smile of Oisia" (George W. Proctor)
- "Pride of the Fleet" (Bruce Jones)
- "Straggler from Atlantis" (Manly Wade Wellman)
- "The Ring of Set" (Richard L. Tierney)
- "Largarut's Bane" (Raul Garcia Capella)
- "Dragons' Teeth" (David Drake)
- "The Sustenance of Hoak" (Ramsey Campbell)

== Reception ==
The anthology was reviewed by Lin Carter in The Year's Best Fantasy Stories: 4 (1978), and by Beatrice Gemignani in Science Fiction Review, Summer 1991.
