= Dark Assassin =

Dark Assassin is a 1984 role-playing game adventure published by FASA for Thieves' World.

== Plot summary ==
Dark Assassin involves the player characters in an ancient blood feud between two Rankan royal families. It features appearances by Enas Yorl and Meliot the scribe. The adventure starts in the Vulgar Unicorn, where the hungry characters take a job collecting a debt from a mage — only to interrupt a demon summoning meant to assassinate a Rankan noble. The characters must track, confront, and bind the demon using clues and arcane equipment left behind. The module introduces details about the Governor's Palace.

Dark Assassin involves the player characters in a bitter feud between two Rankan royal houses, where mages and demons complicate the struggle. The scenario also provides details on the Governor's Palace.

== Publication history ==
Dark Assassin was written by Dave Tennes and published by FASA in 1984 as a 48-page book.

Dark Assassin is the third Thieves' World adventure by FASA, a 48-page module.

Shannon Appelcline noted that "none of FASA's early RPG lines were very long lived [...] The Thieves' World line was the longest lasting, with its fourth and final adventure, Dark Assassin (1984), published a full year later."

== Reception ==
Paul Ryan O'Connor reviewed Dark Assassin for Different Worlds magazine and stated that "Dark Assassin is recommended reading for anyone wishing an enjoyable adventure set in Sanctuary. Hopefully, FASA's further adventures will follow the example set by Dark Assassin."
