= Shadows of Sanctuary =

1981 short story collection edited by Robert Lynn Asprin

- Shadows of Sanctuary (Original Printing)
- Editor: Robert Asprin
- Language: English
- Published: 1981
- Publication place: United States

Shadows of Sanctuary is a short story collection edited by Robert Lynn Asprin and published in 1981. It is the third in the Thieves' World anthology series.

== Contents ==
"Introduction" by Robert Lynn Asprin

Hakiem the storyteller witnesses the return of One-Thumb to The Vulgar Unicorn.

"Looking for Satan" by Vonda N. McIntyre

Lythande aids a group of travelers to free their enslaved friend, a winged man from the North.

"Ischade" by C.J. Cherryh

Hanse is recruited by shape-shifting wizard Enos Yorl to spy on Ischade, a dangerous magic wielder newly-arrived in Sanctuary.

"A Gift in Parting" by Robert Lynn Asprin

Young Hort helps his fisherman father capture a monster terrorizing the docks of Sanctuary.

"The Vivisectionist" by Andrew J. Offutt

At the request of Prince Kadakithis, Hanse attempts to rescue Tempus from his tortured imprisonment by Kurd the vivisectionist.

"The Rhinoceros and the Unicorn" by Diana L. Paxson

In exchange for his portrait of Jarveena, out of work painter Lalo receives a gift from Enas Yorl: the power to paint the souls of his subjects.

"Then Azyuna Danced" by Lynn Abbey

Tempus and Prince Kadakithis join to disrupt the devious plans of High Priest Molin Torchholder during a ritual for the god Vashanka.

"A Man and His God" by Janet Morris

Aided by Hanse and the Stepson Abarsis, Tempus exacts revenge on his adversaries, frees his sister Cime from imprisonment, and reconciles his role as Vashanka's servant.

Essay: "Things the Editor Never Told Me" by Lynn Abbey

== Reception ==
Greg Costikyan reviewed Shadows of Sanctuary in Ares Magazine #12 and commented that "In Shadows, Sanctuary becomes even more fully described; it is rapidly turning into one of the most depraved and violent cities in fantasy fiction. If you enjoy a dash of blood-encrusted evil with your heroic fantasy, Shadows will prove fun."

Shadows of Sanctuary won the 1982 Locus Award for Best Anthology.

== Reviews ==
- Review by Roger C. Schlobin (1982) in Fantasy Newsletter, #44 January 1982
- Review by Tom Easton (1982) in Analog Science Fiction/Science Fact, June 1982
