= Great Dark Horde =

American historical re-enactment group

- Founded: 1971
- Founder: "Yang the Nauseating" (Robert Asprin) and friends
- Type: subset of 501(c)(3) non-profit corporation
- Purpose: Historical reenactment
- Region served: Worldwide
- Website: www.greatdarkhorde.org

The Great Dark Horde is an independent "household" (a social sub-group or quasi-fraternal organization) within the Society for Creative Anachronism (SCA), a historical reenactment group founded with the aim of studying and recreating pre-17th century Western European cultures and their histories. Although one can also find members in other re-enactment groups, it may very well be the largest household in that organization. It covers all the Kingdoms, though in some Kingdoms members do not always advertise themselves as Hordesmen.

The Dark Horde first appeared (or, as they put it, "walked out of the trees") at a Crown Tourney of the Middle Kingdom, on May 8, 1971 (A.S. V, in SCA notation). One of the more notable co-founders was fantasy author Robert Asprin (who in the SCA was known as "Yang the Nauseating"). According to eyewitness accounts, some attendees wondered who let the bike gang in the event. According to Yang himself in a song he wrote describing the incident, he was hailed as the Khakhan of the Horde because while en route to that event he and his friends stopped at a bike shop that was having a sale on sheepskin biker's vests. The others all bought vests that had dyed fleece, while the only one he found that would fit him was natural. Because his was different from the rest, he had to be the "leader of the pack".

Although the Dark Horde is particularly interested in the historical aspects of pre-1650 Mongol culture, some members have personae of Slavic, Middle Eastern, Viking, Celtic, Cherokee, German, Japanese, and Chinese origins, among others. Thus, one cannot always identify Hordesmen by their garb. They may very well be dressed as a Cavalier, a Crusader, or wearing a royal Crown.

This diversity is an homage to the historical Mongol Empire, which not only covered the greatest land-mass of any single country to date, but also that the Mongols were generally tolerant of the cultural and religious differences of those they absorbed. They did not impose their belief systems, customs, or mores on subjugated peoples, nor even much care how they lived or whom they worshiped, as long as they were prompt with required tributary payments and did not try to rebel.

Members of the Great Dark Horde are held to ideals of self-discipline, honor, and the pursuit of perfection; equality and respect for each person, regardless of race, sex, age, or allegiance; and camaraderie and friendship.

Although the role of the Horde is to serve as an anti-aristocratical alternative within the SCA, Horde members have served as King and/or Queen (and as Prince and/or Princess) in many SCA Kingdoms and Principalities; have served as officers at all levels of the SCA; have served as Baron/Baroness of SCA Baronies; and have earned almost every known award and rank of peerage the SCA has to offer.

The emblem of the Great Dark Horde is a red and black yin-yang symbol traversed by a yellow lightning-bolt. Those Horde members who wish to be known as such are identifiable by cords of braided, woven, or twisted red and black yarn which hang from the belt, commonly called "Horde Cords". Those who choose not to be openly known as such are sometimes jocularly referred to as "ninjas".
