= The Rise and Fall of a Dragon King =

1996 Dark Sun novel by Lynn Abbey

- Cover
- Language: English
- Genre: Fantasy novel
- Published: 1996
- Publication place: United States
- Media type: Print

The Rise and Fall of a Dragon King is a fantasy novel by Lynn Abbey, set in the world of Dark Sun, and based on the Dungeons & Dragons role-playing game. It is the fifth and final novel published in the "Chronicles of Athas" series. It was published in April 1996 (ISBN 0-7869-0476-3).

== Plot summary ==
The Rise and Fall of a Dragon King tells the story of Hamanu.

== Reception ==
Paul Pettengale reviewed The Rise and Fall of a Dragon King for Arcane magazine, rating it a 5 out of 10 overall. He comments that, "Of all the AD&D 'worlds' I've played in, the Dark Sun setting is by far my favourite. It has to be said, it does have certain moralistic overtones (the environmental ones are pretty obvious), and this novel continues the trend (it even has a dedication to all those millions who have died because of the intolerance of others). Exacting vengeance is what this particular tale is all about. That, and the dangers of power when wielded by the foolish." He adds that "The basic premise is somewhat hackneyed. Chap's parents get killed. Chap goes after the killers. Chap becomes King of the World. Hmm, a rather grandiose leap there, but it all comes good (or rather bad) in the end, because Hamanu ultimately spells his own downfall through the execution of his extreme prejudices." Pettengale concludes his review by saying, "All this makes for an interesting story, embellished by the lurid descriptions of the cruel world in which it is set, but it's all highly predictable in its outcome (and not only because of the name of the book). You just know that because the lead character gets way too big for his boots he's going to end up coming a cropper. Dark Sun refs may want to check it out for the background details and the descriptive passages, but you wouldn't want to check it out for its plot."
