= The Bug Wars =

1979 science fiction novel by Robert Asprin

- First edition (publ. St. Martin's Press); Cover art by Gary La Sasso
- Author: Robert Asprin
- Language: English
- Publisher: St. Martin's Press
- Publication date: 1979
- ISBN: 0-312-10761-7 (first edition)
- Dewey Decimal: 813.54
- LC Class: PZ4.A84123 Bu

The Bug Wars (ISBN 0440108063) is a 1979 science fiction novel by Robert Asprin.

Asprin credits the song "Reminder" by Buck Coulson as his inspiration for the novel. The lyrics of the song are printed at the beginning of some editions of the book.

== Plot summary ==
The Bug Wars takes place an unspecified length of time before the present, in an unspecified part of the galaxy. The song "Reminder" would suggest that it is at least one million years. Opening with the main character, Rahm, waking from stasis, the book covers his campaigns as part of the Tzen Warrior caste against a coalition of large Insect species; the Wasps, Leapers, and Ants, in that order.

After a mission to destroy the Wasp nests and queens on a planet, the Tzen intend to colonize. However, because of Tzen military practices, that a task force leaves after a predicted proportion of units return, assuming that all others are casualties, Rahm's flight group was stranded on the planet. The Tzen would return in a year to eliminate the Leapers, insects not unlike a praying mantis.

While stranded, the team made a number of discoveries, chief among which was that the Tzen needed to find a natural predator of the Leapers to defeat them. The standard practice for the Tzen is to kill the next generation of insects before it is born, then return later to kill any remaining adults. The Leapers are immune to this, however, because they are all capable of reproduction, and bury their eggs, making them impossible to eradicate without levying resources unavailable to the Tzen Empire.

After the Empire returns as planned to eradicate the leapers, they retreat and begin looking for a creature that eats insect eggs. Rahm is selected to lead a team of Tzen from each caste to find such a creature. When they set up a pre-fabricated building as their base, they soon discover a number of hostile flora and fauna, including a plant with toxic thorns, Spiders, and a colony of Ants near their base. Several of the team are captured by the Ants, and learn that they are intelligent and capable of telepathic communication. When the team discovers a suitable creature, they round up as many as they can, but are hounded by the insects. The mission culminates in a battle between the Tzen and Insects at the base.

After the leapers have been defeated, Rahm is selected to lead a campaign against the Ants as a Planetary Commander. The mission is considered almost suicidal, with a casualty estimate of at least seventy percent. In the middle of the battle, Rahm discovers that, while they have eliminated the Ants primary power source, they had a reserve strong enough for one use of a power-consuming device. One colony used theirs for cold-beam lasers, another used it to launch an escape shuttle, which was promptly destroyed. After defeating the Ants, Rahm returned to stasis, to be reawakened whenever the empire needed him.
