= Swords Against Darkness V =

1979 anthology edited by Andrew J. Offutt

- Cover of the first edition.
- Editor: Andrew J. Offutt
- Cover artist: Luis Bermejo
- Language: English
- Series: Swords Against Darkness
- Genre: Fantasy short stories
- Publisher: Zebra Books
- Publication date: 1979
- Publication place: United States
- Media type: Print (paperback)
- Pages: 288
- ISBN: 0-89083-550-0
- LC Class: PN6071.F25
- Preceded by: Swords Against Darkness IV

Swords Against Darkness V is an anthology of fantasy stories, edited by Andrew J. Offutt, the fifth and last in a series of five anthologies of the same name. It was first published in paperback by Zebra Books in November 1979, and later reprinted by the same publisher; a Canadian reprint was issued by General Paperbacks in 1981.

== Summary ==
The book collects twelve short stories and novelettes by various fantasy authors, together with a foreword by Offutt.

== Contents ==
- "Foreword to the Fifth Volume of Swords Against Darkness" (Andrew J. Offutt)
- "The Mouths of Light" (Ramsey Campbell)
- "Perfidious Amber" (Tanith Lee)
- "Awake, Awake, Ye Northern Winds" (Simon Green)
- "Rats" (Robert Fester)
- "The Forging" (Robin Kincaid)
- "Hungry Grass" (Keith Taylor)
- "The Tale of the Cat, the Mouse, the Sorcerer, and the Children" (Edward DeGeorge)
- "Golden Vanity" (James Anderson)
- "The Castle of Kites and Crows" (Darrell Schweitzer)
- "The Scream of the Rose" (Paul McGuire)
- "Joni" (Gordon Linzner)
- "Druin's Heritage" (Richard K. Lyon)

== Awards ==
The book was nominated, together with the preceding volume, for the 1980 Balrog Award for Best Collection/Anthology.
