= Thieves' World (role-playing game) =

Fantasy tabletop role-playing game supplement

- Cover Illustration by Walter Velez.
- Designers: Dave Arneson, Eric Goldberg, Rudy Kraft, Wes Ives, Stephen Marsh, Midkemia Press, Marc W. Miller, Steve Perrin, Lawrence Schick, Ken St. Andre
- Publishers: Chaosium
- Publication: 1981
- Genres: Fantasy
- Systems: Basic Role-Playing

Thieves' World is a role-playing game supplement published by Chaosium in 1981, based on the Thieves' World series of novels. It was notable for including rules and statistics allowing for its use with nine different fantasy and science-fiction RPG gaming systems.

== Contents ==
The Thieves' World Complete Sanctuary Adventure Pack is a boxed set published by Chaosium in 1981, containing: 1) The Player's Guide to Sanctuary; 2) The Gamemaster's Guide to Sanctuary; 3) Personalities of Sanctuary; 4) Map of Sanctuary; 5) Map of the Maze; 6) Map of the Maze Underground.

Just as the Thieves' World series of books was a shared universe with multiple authors using a common setting, Chaosium initially positioned the Thieves' World RPG as a setting that could be used with multiple game systems. The Personalities of Sanctuary included statistics and gaming notes for Advanced Dungeons & Dragons, Adventures in Fantasy, Chivalry & Sorcery, DragonQuest, Dungeons & Dragons, The Fantasy Trip, RuneQuest, Traveller, and Tunnels & Trolls. Later products in the series provided stats only for RuneQuest and Rolemaster/Middle-earth Role Playing. Thieves' World series contributing novelists Lynn Abbey, Poul Anderson, Robert Asprin, Marion Zimmer Bradley, John Brunner, Christine DeWees, David Drake, Philip José Farmer, Joe Haldeman, Janet Morris, Andrew Offutt, and A.E. van Vogt wrote descriptions, essays, and short stories for the player and game master volumes in the box set, and game designers Dave Arneson, Eric Goldberg, Rudy Kraft, Wes Ives, Stephen Marsh, Midkemia Press, Marc W. Miller, Steve Perrin, Lawrence Schick, and Ken St. Andre helped translate the world into the various game systems.

The Thieves' World Companion was published in 1986 to update the setting.

== Reception ==
Harry White reviewed Thieves' World in The Space Gamer No. 45. White commented that "it's worth the price. Thieves' World provides a wealth of information for repeated use but allows considerable flexibility for individual creativity and customizing. Physically, typographically and artistically it is a quality product. Highly recommended if you don't expect miracles and need a home for your adventurers."

Thieves' World was awarded the Origins Award for "Best Roleplaying Adventure of 1981".

Oliver Dickinson reviewed Thieves' World for White Dwarf #30, giving it an overall rating of 10 out of 10, and stated that "This has to be one of the most challenging adventure packs to come on the market. It is a whole city, realised with a richness and thoroughness of detail that matches City State of the Invincible Overlord, and though not as comprehensive as this, it presented in a much more readable form."

Steve List reviewed Thieves' World in Ares Magazine #13 and commented that "Thieves' World is not a work that allows a GM to spend merely a few hours reading it, nor does it present a campaign that will be exhausted in a few playings. It does provide a vehicle with which a GM willing to devote the time can create an entire city which should never grow stale no matter how many times it is visited."

J C Conner reviewed Thieves' World for Imagine magazine, and stated that "There is plenty of information in this pack for the DM to make a really first rate and exciting city for the players, fleshed out by their collective imaginations and perhaps coloured by the books, if you can get them. The set may seem a little pricey - what isn't these days? - but it is worth every penny."

Paul Ryan O'Connor reviewed Thieves' World for Different Worlds magazine and stated that "TW has outlived the usefulness of some of the systems for which it was written, and quality support products for TW have not been produced. The product requires a great deal of gamemaster input before it can be used. But the charm and quality of TW is as strong today as it ever has been, and I can see no way to give Thieves' World anything but my highest recommendation."

In the October 1988 edition of Games International, James Wallis noted that "unfortunately [the player] needs a good knowledge of [Robert Asprin's Thieves' World books] to bring it alive." Further, Mason found "Good attention is paid to the fantasy background, but neither the areas of the town nor the more notable citizens are fully fleshed out." Wallis thought that far too much space was wasted on listing monster and character statistics for "every rolegame imaginable." Wallis concluded, "If you know the books or are prepared to put work into it then Thieves' World is still worth a look, but it is showing its age."

In his 1990 book The Complete Guide to Role-Playing Games, game critic Rick Swan called it "among the most ambitious projects of its kind and one of the most enjoyable." But Swan pointed out "Though it's a terrific idea, converting Thieves' World to all of [the different game systems] doesn't always work, owing to [those] games' diverse approaches to magic, religion, and combat." Swan also noted "in spite of the sheer volume of material, there's only a couple of pages of suggestions for adventurers; it's pretty much up to the referee to design scenarios from scratch." Swan concluded by giving this game a rating of 2.5 out of 4.

John O'Neill of Black Gate comments: "It was a beautiful product that rose above the gimmick at its core. Sanctuary was the city where anything could happen, where characters created by some of the best fantasy writers of the generation crossed paths and shared adventures. Chaosium's Thieves' World became the setting where gamers of every stripe could likewise gather and share a beer... and perhaps an expedition into the caverns beneath The Maze together."

== Reviews ==
- Analog Science Fiction and Fact
- Adventure Gaming #4
