= Traitor (Thieves' World) =

Tabletop role-playing game adventure

- Publishers: FASA
- Publication: 1982
- Genres: Role-playing
- Parent games: Thieves' World

Traitor is a 1982 fantasy role-playing game adventure for Thieves' World, published by FASA.

== Plot summary ==
Traitor is an adventure set in the city of Sanctuary in which the player characters are Hawkmasks serving the crime lord Jubal and are ambushed so that an important document meant for Jubal can be stolen from them.

== Contents ==
Traitor is the first adventure approved by Chaosium to be published by FASA for Thieves' World.

== Reception ==
William A. Barton reviewed Traitor in The Space Gamer No. 55. Barton commented that "Overall, Traitor is an excellent offering that should provide plenty of excitement in Sanctuary. And even those TW enthusiasts who don't want to run or play the adventure itself should find the bonus essay from Robert Aspirin himself on gaming Jubal plus the new background info on Sanctuary well worth shelling out the price of the book."

Oliver Dickinson reviewed Traitor for White Dwarf #38, giving it an overall rating of 7 out of 10, and stated that "all in all, these look like testing and enjoyable adventures."

Paul Ryan O'Connor reviewed Traitor for Different Worlds magazine and stated that "In summation, Traitor gets a guarded recommendation. The presentation is so-so. The price might not be worth it, depending on what you are used to. The stats offered for the characters are largely useless. The booklet can be difficult to read. The scenario is clever. The detail and development added to the city of Sanctuary is worthwhile. Traitor is not bad, but it is by no stretch of the imagination a 'must buy' either."
