= Swords Against Darkness IV =

1979 anthology edited by Andrew J. Offutt

- Cover of the first edition.
- Editor: Andrew J. Offutt
- Cover artist: Luis Bermejo
- Language: English
- Series: Swords Against Darkness
- Genre: Fantasy short stories
- Publisher: Zebra Books
- Publication date: 1979
- Publication place: United States
- Media type: Print (paperback)
- Pages: 272
- ISBN: 0-89083-539-X
- OCLC: 6245015
- Preceded by: Swords Against Darkness III
- Followed by: Swords Against Darkness V

Swords Against Darkness IV is an anthology of fantasy stories, edited by Andrew J. Offutt, the fourth in a series of five anthologies of the same name. It was first published in paperback by Zebra Books in September 1979, and reprinted by the same publisher in 1981; a Canadian reprint was issued by General Paperbacks, also in 1981.

== Summary ==
The book collects eleven short stories and novelettes and one essay by various fantasy authors, together with a foreword in two parts and a "special word" by Offutt.

== Contents ==
- "Foreword - In Two Parts" (Andrew J. Offutt)
- "Mai-Kulala" (Charles R. Saunders)
- "At the Sign of the Brass Breast" (Jeff P. Swycaffer)
- "The Reaping" (Ardath Mayhar)
- "The Ballad of Borrell" (Gordon Linzner)
- "Deux Amours d'une Sorciere" (Tanith Lee)
- "Of PIGS and MEN" (essay) (Poul Anderson)
- "Cryptically Yours" (Brian Lumley)
- "Dedication: A Special Word" (Andrew J. Offutt)
- "The Dark Mother" (Diana L. Paxson)
- "Wooden Crate of Violent Death" (Joey Froehlich)
- "The Fane of the Grey Rose" (Charles de Lint)
- "Sandmagic" (Orson Scott Card)
- "The Edge of the World" (Manly Wade Wellman)

== Reception ==
The anthology was reviewed by David Dvorkin in Science Fiction & Fantasy Review, November 1979, Orson Scott Card in Science Fiction Review, February 1980, and Lin Carter in The Year's Best Fantasy Stories: 6 (1980).

== Awards ==
The book was nominated, together with the succeeding volume, for the 1980 Balrog Award for Best Collection/Anthology.
