= Swords Against Darkness II =

1977 anthology edited by Andrew J. Offutt

- Cover of the first edition.
- Editor: Andrew J. Offutt
- Cover artist: Larry Kresek
- Language: English
- Series: Swords Against Darkness
- Genre: Fantasy short stories
- Publisher: Zebra Books
- Publication date: 1977
- Publication place: United States
- Media type: Print (Paperback)
- Pages: 284
- ISBN: 0-89083-293-5
- OCLC: 3595933
- Preceded by: Swords Against Darkness
- Followed by: Swords Against Darkness III

Swords Against Darkness II is an anthology of fantasy stories, edited by Andrew J. Offutt, the second in a series of five anthologies of the same name. It was first published in paperback by Zebra Books in September 1977.

== Summary ==
The book collects eight short stories and novelettes by various fantasy authors, with an introductory essay by Offutt.

== Contents ==
- "Call It What You Will" (Andrew J. Offutt)
- "Sword of Unbelief" (Andre Norton)
- "The Changer of Names" (Ramsey Campbell)
- "The Dweller in the Temple" (Manly Wade Wellman)
- "The Coming of Age in Zamora" (David M. Harris)
- "The Scroll of Thoth" (Richard L. Tierney)
- "Odds Against the Gods" (Tanith Lee)
- "On Skellig Michael" (Dennis More)
- "Last Quest" (Andrew J. Offutt)
