= Tales from the Vulgar Unicorn =

1980 anthology of fantasy stories edited by Robert Lynn Asprin

- Tales from the Vulgar Unicorn (Original Printing)
- Editor: Robert Asprin
- Language: English
- Published: 1980
- Publication place: United States

Tales from the Vulgar Unicorn is an anthology of fantasy stories edited by Robert Lynn Asprin and published in 1980. It is the second in the Thieves' World series, featuring stories by a variety of authors with the common setting of Sanctuary, a city at the far southern corner of the empire where all the less-than-law-abiding citizens of the world tend to congregate.

== Contents ==
"Introduction" by Robert Lynn Asprin

Hakiem the storyteller observes the decline of the Vulgar Unicorn tavern since One-Thumb's disappearance.

"Spiders of the Purple Mage" by Philip José Farmer

Midwife Masha zil-Ineel must penetrate the island defenses of the Purple Mage to save her family.

"Goddess" by David Drake

Cirdonian nobleman Samlor takes revenge on the demon Dyareela, who caused the death of his sister, and destroys the Temple of Heqt in the center of Sanctuary.

"The Fruit of Enlibar" by Lynn Abbey

Illyra, the half S'danzo seer, aids her half-brother Walegrin's search for fabled Enlibar steel to rebuild the army under his command.

"The Dream of the Sorceress" by A.E. van Vogt

Searching for his father's murderer, healer Alten Stulwig becomes entangled in a game between war-god Vashanka and his lover Azyuna.

"Vashanka's Minion" by Janet Morris

Tempus challenges the war-god Vashanka by destroying the deity's temple of magic weapons which is corrupting the citizens of Sanctuary.

"Shadow's Pawn" by Andrew J. Offutt

Hanse (Shadowspawn) hunts a fearsome magical weapon which brings out a victim's deepest terror.

"To Guard the Guardians" by Robert Lynn Asprin

Zalbar, Captain of the Prince's Bodyguard, teams with the crime lord Jubal to defeat an old foe.

Essay: "The Lighter Side of Sanctuary" by Robert Lynn Asprin

== Reception ==
Greg Costikyan reviewed Tales from the Vulgar Unicorn in Ares Magazine #8 and commented that "Tales from the Vulgar Unicorn and Another Fine Myth are excellent reading. If you're suffering from the Hong Kong-Asian-mid-winter flu, take two Asprin and read in bed."

Colin Greenland reviewed Tales from the Vulgar Unicorn for Imagine magazine, and stated that "Not so good as volume 1, partly because of space wasted by Philip Jose Farmer and A.E. van Vogt, two burnt-out stars if ever there were; but Lynn Abbey is on form, and the overall idea continues to be entertaining."

== Reviews ==
- Review by Judith Hanna (1985) in Paperback Inferno, #52
