= The Cold Cash War =

1977 novel by Robert Asprin

- First edition cover Cover design by Irene Friedman
- Author: Robert Asprin
- Genre: Science fiction
- Publisher: St. Martin's Press
- Publication date: September 2, 1977

The Cold Cash War is a 1977 science fiction novel by Robert Asprin.

The book is an expanded version of the novelette "Cold Cash War", published in the August 1977 issue of Analog. It takes place in a semi-dystopian near-future in which the enormous corporate cartels that have come to dominate the West have begun resolving their disputes with small-scale, nonlethal wars, fought by professional mercenaries.

== Setting ==
The novel has been noted as an early example of proto-cyberpunk: capitalism is ascendant (the Communist bloc has severed relations with the West after a ruinous Sino-Soviet war), nation-states are losing relevancy in world affairs to corporations, communications technology is of prime importance, and the West is coming to terms with the rising economic power of Japan. Intercorporate conflicts are normally fought under nonlethal rules of engagement, using "killsuits"—a reverse version of powered armor, which immobilizes the wearer if the on-board computer detects a disabling hit.

== Plot ==
Major Stephen Tidwell, a veteran mercenary commander employed by the Communications Combine, finds himself dismissed and blacklisted over a string of inexplicable failures in the field. Tidwell and his friend, Oil Coalition mercenary Michael Clancy, are almost immediately offered an extremely lucrative contract by the Zaibatsu—a conglomerate of major Japanese corporations—who wish to raise a strike force trained to Western standards. Tidwell accepts, and learns that the Japanese have infiltrated Communications and Oil at the highest levels, and were behind his dismissal. Upon his arrival in Japan, he is further astonished by the high standard of the Zaibatsu troops he is to lead, consisting of recruits from ultranationalist groups descended from Yukio Mishima's Tatenokai. (The narrative does not specify a date, but it does mention that Mishima's suicide occurred "over twenty years ago," suggesting the early 1990s.)

== Sequel ==
Asprin revisited the setting in 1989 with Cold Cash Warrior, an interactive fiction coauthored with Bill Fawcett and using the Combat Command TRPG system. Mainly a tabletop RPG rulebook and scenario, it also contained roughly a novelette's worth of prose, constituting a detailed description of a tactical encounter in one of the inter-corporate conflicts of the setting.
