= Thieves' World (book) =

1979 anthology of short stories edited by Robert Asprin

- Thieves' World #1 (Original Printing)
- Editor: Robert Asprin
- Language: English
- Published: 1979
- Publication place: United States

Thieves' World is an anthology of short stories edited by Robert Asprin published in 1979, the first in the Thieves' World anthology series.

== Contents ==
Thieves' World is a collection of stories which take place in the trading city of Sanctuary, located on the southern end of a peninsula, which has transformed into a den of thieves.

"Introduction" by Robert Lynn Asprin

The Emperor of the Rankan Empire sends his stepbrother Prince Kadakithis to restore order to Sanctuary, accompanied by five elite guards dubbed Hell-Hounds.

"Sentences of Death" by John Brunner

Jarveena, a Yenized scribe, makes a deal with the wizard Enas Yorl to foil the assassination of Prince Kadakithis and take revenge on a past enemy.

"The Face of Chaos" by Lynn Abbey

Illyra, the half S'danzo seer, attempts to save a virgin bride from being sacrificed to consecrate a new temple for the gods.

"The Gate of the Flying Knives" by Poul Anderson

Minstrel Cappen Varra journeys to a magical plane to rescue his kidnapped lover, aided by adventurer Jamie the Red.

"Shadowspawn" by Andrew Offutt

Young thief Shadowspawn (Hanse) becomes involved in a plot to steal the Rod of Authority from Prince Kadakithis.

"The Price of Doing Business" by Robert Lynn Asprin

Crime lord Jubal is lured into a trap as revenge for a death caused by his criminal network, but his life is saved by the Hell-Hound Zalbar.

"Blood Brothers" by Joe Haldeman:

Bartender and underground criminal One-Thumb meets his fate when betrayed by a wizard in a business deal.

"Myrtis" by Christine DeWees

Aphrodisia House owner Myrtis prevents the shutdown of her brothel by casting a love spell on Zalbar and revealing one of Sanctuary's deepest secrets.

"The Secret of the Blue Star" by Marion Zimmer Bradley

Lythande must protect a perilous secret from being discovered by a rival wizard of the same order.

Essay: "The Making of Thieves' World" by Robert Lynn Asprin

== Reception ==
Greg Costikyan reviewed Thieves' World in Ares Magazine #1. Costikyan commented that "since fantasy role-playing involves the group production of a multi-hero fantasy story, role-playing fans especially will find Thieves' World enjoyable. [...] The stories themselves range from mediocre to excellent, but all are worth reading."

Colin Greenland reviewed Thieves' World for Imagine magazine, and stated that "The result is an intriguingly different fantasy anthology. All those different viewpoints and flavours really do give Sanctuary three dimensions, if not more. Bradley's sentimentality is offset by Joe Haldeman's cynicism, Lynn Abbey's poignant mystery by Robert Asprin's shrewd morality."

Thieves' World was nominated for the 1980 World Fantasy Award—Collection.

== Reviews ==
- Review by Don D'Ammassa (1986) in Science Fiction Chronicle, #83 August 1986
