= Tempus (novel) =

2011 collection of short stories by Janet Morris

- First edition
- Author: Janet Morris
- Cover artist: Gary Ruddell
- Language: English
- Series: Sacred Band series
- Genre: Fantasy
- Publisher: Paradise Publishing
- Publication date: April 11, 2011
- Publication place: United States
- Media type: Print (paperback)
- Pages: 306
- ISBN: 978-0-615-46554-8

Tempus With His Right Side Companion Niko is a novelized collection of fourteen previously published short stories in the Sacred Band series by Janet Morris. Originally published in 1987 by Baen, it was reissued in 2011 by Paradise Publishing.

== Reception ==
Robert W. Cape, Jr., in Classical Traditions in Science Fiction wrote of Tempus (1987; 2011), Tempus Unbound (1989; 2017) and The Sacred Band (2010) "A fantasy series about the Sacred Band of Stepsons, an elite army modeled on the fourth-century B.C.E. Sacred Band of Thebes. The stories explore the fraught personal relationships of mixed hetero- and homosexual troops, only sometimes paired, as they fight for their commander, the immortal Tempus. Morris includes archaeological and historical details, from physical items to social practices, religion, and philosophy, to create a fantasy world that is, in many ways, more historically accurate than many popular accounts of antiquity."
