= George Wyatt Proctor =

Author, journalist and lecturer

George Wyatt Proctor (Dec. 8, 1946 - Aug. 3, 2008) was an author, journalist, and lecturer at the University of Texas at Arlington. Proctor worked at The Dallas Morning News for five years before becoming a science fiction and Western author. Of his 96 published works, three were recognized by writers' associations and many were nominated for or won awards.

A part of the College of Liberal Arts' Department of Communication for over 12 years, Proctor lectured on topics such as advertising, communication technology and journalism at the University of Texas at Arlington. After his death, the George W. & Lana B. Proctor Endowed Scholarship was established for advertising, communication technology, journalism or pre-law students.

== Personal life ==
A Lampasas, Texas, native and Arlington resident, Proctor grew up on a horse training and operating farm near Gilmer, Texas. One of five children, Proctor decided that, unlike his father and brothers, he would not be a horse trainer, although he always had a love for them.

Proctor received a bachelor's degree in journalism from Texas Tech University, working his way through college doing menial labor at KLBK-TV in Lubbock, Texas.

After graduating and marrying his wife, Lana, in 1969, George W. Proctor became a newspaper reporter. He worked on the police, county government, and county courts beats for The Dallas Morning News for five years, while also writing book reviews for the newspaper. Proctor left The Dallas Morning News in 1975 to pursue writing, editing, and artwork.

George W. Proctor wrote under pseudonyms, including Geo.W. Proctor, John Cleve, Lee Wyatt, and also collaborated with writers Robert E. Vardeman, Andrew J. Offutt, Howard Waldrop, Steven Utley, and Arthur C. Clarke.

Following his death, Proctor continued to influence early 21st century television viewers when the science fiction series V (2009–11) was based on a book series to which he was a contributor.

== Published works ==
Film

- Shadow Kill (2004) [as by Geo W. Proctor]

Novels

- The Flesh Hunters (1972) [as by Lee Wyatt]
- The Esper Transfer (1978)
- Shadowman (1980) also appeared as:
  - Variant Title: Der Schattenmann [German] (1985) [as by Geo.W. Proctor]
- Fire at the Center (1981)
- The Manhuntress (1982) with Andrew J. Offutt [only as by John Cleve]
- The Yoke of Shen (1983) with Andrew J. Offutt [only as by John Cleve]
- Starwings (1984)
- Blood Fountain (1985) with Robert E. Vardeman
- The Texas Run (1985)
- The Chicago Conversion (1985)
- To Demons Bound (1985) with Robert E. Vardeman
- A Yoke of Magic (1985) with Robert E. Vardeman
- Death's Acolyte (1986) with Robert E. Vardeman
- The Beasts of the Mist (1986) with Robert E. Vardeman
- For Crown and Kingdom (1987) with Robert E. Vardeman
- Stellar Fist (1989)
- Ride for Vengeance (1989)
- Before Honor (1993)
- Blade of the Conqueror (1995) with Robert E. Vardeman
- The Jewels of Life (1995) with Robert E. Vardeman
- The Tombs of A'bre (1995) with Robert E. Vardeman

Anthologies

- Lone Star Universe (1976) with Steven Utley
- The Science Fiction Hall of Fame, Volume III (1981) with Arthur C. Clarke

Short Fiction

- Gift Hearse (1973) [only as by George W. Proctor]
- Paper Work (1973) [only as by George W. Proctor]
- Up, Uranus! (1974) with Howard Waldrop and Steven Utley [only as by F. D. Wyatt]
- The Migration (1976)
- The Smile of Oisia (1977)
- A Kingdom Won (1978) also appeared as:
  - Variant Title: Nalcon von Paldrid [German] (1981) [as by Geo W. Proctor]
- Death's Sweet Promise (1979)
- The Night of the Piasa (1979) with J. C. Green [also as by George W. Proctor and J. C. Green]
- The Good Is Oft Interred (1981)
- The Gift of Life, the Debt of Death (1982)
