= Andrew J. Offutt =

American novelist

- Born: August 16, 1934; Kentucky, U.S.
- Died: April 30, 2013 (aged 78); Kentucky, U.S.
- Occupations: Writer, editor
- Writing career
- Genres: Science fiction, fantasy, erotic fiction

Andrew Jefferson Offutt V (August 16, 1934 – April 30, 2013) was an American science fiction, fantasy, and erotic fiction author. He wrote as Andrew J. Offutt, A. J. Offutt, and Andy Offutt, often stylized in all lowercase. His erotica appeared under seventeen different pseudonyms, principally John Cleve, John Denis, Jeff Morehead, and Turk Winter.

The Sword of Skelos (1979), one of Offutt's contributions to the Conan The Barbarian saga, included a short, facetious biographical note:

"Andrew J. Offutt is the recently 'tired and re-tired', as he puts it, president of the Science Fiction Writers of America. He loves heroic fantasy though at 6' 1" he is built for speed, not combat. Kentuckian Offutt has a number of other books in and out of print, and has been a helpless fan of Robert E. Howard since birth. Now he calls himself the Steve Garvey among writers; 'Surely it's every boy's dream to grow up—but not too much—and get to write about Conan'. Offutt researches with gusto, both in and out of books, having—briefly and painfully, he says—worn chainmail and helm and wielded sword. He is also tired of aged, bald, ugly, sexless mages and squeaky females in heroic fantasy".

== Life and family ==
Offutt was born in a log cabin near Taylorsville, Kentucky. He was married for more than 50 years to Jodie McCabe Offutt of Lexington, Kentucky. They had four children: writer Chris Offutt; Jeff Offutt, Professor of Software Engineering at George Mason University; Scotty Hyde, copy editor for the Park City Daily News in Bowling Green, Kentucky; and Melissa Offutt, a sales executive for Sprint in San Diego. Offutt also had five grandchildren, Sam, Steffi, James, Joyce, and Andrew.

== Career in speculative fiction ==
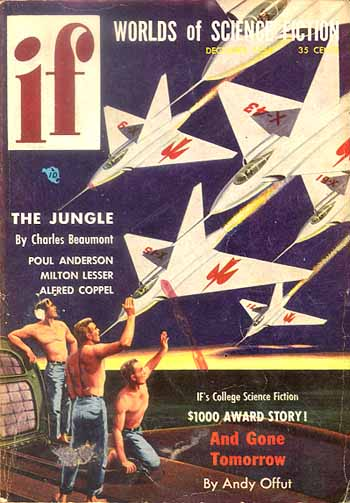
Offutt's first story, "And Gone Tomorrow, appeared in the December 1954 issue of If.

Offutt began publishing in 1954 with the story "And Gone Tomorrow" in the If. Despite this early sale, he did not consider his professional life to have begun until he sold the story "Blacksword" to Galaxy in 1959. His first true science fiction novel was Evil Is Live Spelled Backwards in 1970. Offutt disliked the title of this book, calling it "embarrassingly amateur".

Offutt wrote numerous novels and short stories, including several in the "Thieves World" series edited by Robert Asprin and Lynn Abbey, which feature his best known character, the thief, Hanse, also known as Shadowspawn (and, later, Chance). His "Iron Lords" series, likewise, was popular. Offutt also wrote two series of books based on characters by Robert E. Howard. There was a series on Howard's best known character, Conan, and another one on the less known Cormac mac Art—an Irish Viking active in King Arthur's time. In fact, Offutt wrote about him far more extensively than did Howard himself.

As "John Cleve", Offutt also wrote the 19-book erotic science fiction series "Spaceways", over half of which were collaborations.

As an editor Offutt produced a series of five anthologies entitled Swords Against Darkness, which included the first professional sale by Charles de Lint. From 1976 to 1978 he served as president of the Science Fiction Writers of America (SFWA).

== Career in erotica ==
Offutt wrote at least 420 pornographic/erotic works under seventeen different pen-names and house-names, including Opal Andrews, "Anonymous," Joe Brown, John Cleve, Camille Colben, Jack Cory, Jeremy Crebb, P. N. Dedeaux, John Denis, Jeff Douglas, Farrah Fawkes, Baxter Giles, Alan Marshall, Jeff Morehead, J. (John) X. Williams, Turk Winter, and Jeff Woodson. The first was Bondage Babes, published under the name Alan Marshall by Greenleaf in 1968; the first appearance of his principal pen name, John Cleve, was on Slave of the Sudan in 1969.

According to his son Chris Offutt he came to regard Cleve as more a separate persona than a pen name, and his other aliases as Cleve's pen names, not his own. As "Cleve" he published more than 130 works of erotica before the market for erotica dried up about 1985; afterwards, turning to self-publishing, he issued 260 more as Turk Winter (an early "Cleve" pen name) over the next twenty-five years. Thirty more remained unpublished at the time of his death. So prolific was Offutt in this area that in summing up his writing career his son Chris wrote that he "came to understand that my father had passed as a science-fiction writer while actually pursuing a 50-year career as a pornographer."

== Bibliography ==
=== Thieves' World ===
- "Shadowspawn" (1979) in Thieves' World
- "Shadow's Pawn" (1980)
- "The Vivisectionist" (1981)
- "Godson" (1982)
- "Rebels Aren't Born in Palaces" (1984)
- "The Veiled Lady, or A Look at the Normal Folk" (1985)
- "Spellmaster" (1986), with Jodie Offutt
- "Homecoming" (1987)
- Shadowspawn (1987)
- "Night Work" (1989)
- The Shadow of Sorcery (1993)
- "Role Model" (2002)
- "Dark of the Moon" (2004)

=== War of the Gods on Earth ===
- The Iron Lords (1979)
- Shadows out of Hell (1980)
- The Lady of the Snowmist (1983)

=== War of the Wizards ===
- Demon in the Mirror (1977), with Richard K. Lyon
- The Eyes of Sarsis (1980), with Richard K. Lyon
- Web of the Spider (1981), with Richard K. Lyon

=== Conan ===
- Conan and the Sorcerer (1978)
- Conan: The Sword of Skelos (1979)
- Conan the Mercenary (1980)

=== Cormac mac Art ===
- Sword of the Gael (1975)
- The Undying Wizard (1976)
- The Sign of the Moonbow (1977)
- The Mists of Doom (1977)
- When Death Birds Fly (1980), with Keith Taylor
- The Tower of Death (1982 ), with Keith Taylor

=== Non-series novels ===
- Evil is Live Spelled Backwards (1970)
- The Great 24 Hour "Thing" (1971)
- The Chamber of Pleasures (1971)
- The Castle Keeps (1972)
- The Galactic Rejects (1973)
- Messenger of Zhuvastou (1973)
- Ardor on Aros (1973)
- Operation: Super Ms. (1974)
- "The Black Sorcerer of the Black Castle" (1974)
- Genetic Bomb (1975), with D. Bruce Berry
- Chieftain of Andor (1976)
- My Lord Barbarian (1977)
- King Dragon (1980)
- Rails Across the Galaxy (1982), with Richard Lyon; magazine publication only
- Deathknight (1990)

=== Edited works ===
- Swords Against Darkness (1977)
- Swords Against Darkness II (1977)
- Swords Against Darkness III (1978)
- Swords Against Darkness IV (1979)
- Swords Against Darkness V (1979)

=== Works written under pseudonyms ===
==== Spaceways ====
1. Of Alien Bondage (1982, as John Cleve)
2. Corundum's Woman (1982, as John Cleve)
3. Escape from Macho (1982, as John Cleve)
4. Satana Enslaved (1982, as John Cleve)
5. Master of Misfit (1982, as John Cleve)
6. Purrfect Plunder (1982, as John Cleve)
7. The Manhuntress (1982, with Geo. W. Proctor, as John Cleve)
8. Under Twin Suns (1982, as John Cleve)
9. In Quest of Qalara (1982, as John Cleve)
10. The Yoke of Shen (1983, with Geo. W. Proctor, as John Cleve)
11. The Iceworld Connection (1983, with Jack C. Haldeman II and Vol Haldeman, as by John Cleve)
12. Star Slaver (1983, with G. C. Edmondson, as John Cleve)
13. Jonuta Rising! (1983, with Victor Koman, as John Cleve)
14. Assignment – Hellhole (1983, with Roland J. Green, as John Cleve)
15. Starship Sapphire (1983, with Robin Kincaid, as by John Cleve)
16. The Planet Murderer (1984, with Dwight V. Swain, as by John Cleve)
17. The Carnadyne Horde (1984, with Victor Koman, as by John Cleve)
18. Race Across the Stars (1984, with Robin Kincaid, as by John Cleve)
19. King of the Slavers (1984, as John Cleve)

==== Crusader ====
1. The Accursed Tower (1974, as John Cleve)
2. The Passionate Princess (1974, as John Cleve)
3. Julanar The Lioness (1975, as John Cleve)
4. My Lady Queen (1975, as John Cleve)
5. Saladin's Spy (1986, as John Cleve)
- The Crusader: Books I and II (omnibus, 1980, as John Cleve)
- The Crusader: Books III and IV (omnibus, 1981, as John Cleve)

==== Calamity ====
1. Call me Calamity (1970, as John Cleve)
2. The Juice of Love (1970, as John Cleve)

==== Non-series novels ====
- Bondage Babes (1968, as Alan Marshall)
- Sex Toy (1968, as J. X. Williams)
- Bruise (1969, as John Cleve)
- Nero's Mistress (1969, as John Cleve)
- Slave of the Sudan (1969, as John Cleve)
- Barbarana (1970, as John Cleve)
- Black Man's Harem (1970, as John Cleve)
- Captives in the Chateau de Sade (1970, as John Cleve)
- The Devoured (1970, as John Cleve)
- Fruit of the Loin (1970, as John Cleve)
- Jodinareh (1970, as John Cleve)
- Manlib! (1970, as John Cleve)
- Mongol! (1970, as John Cleve)
- The Prefects aka The Prussian Girls (1970, as P. N. Dedeaux)
- Seed (1970, as John Cleve)
- Swallow the Leader (1970, as John Cleve)
- The Balling Machine (1971) (with D. Bruce Berry, as by Jeff Douglas)
- Chain Me Again (1971, as Opal Andrews)
- Four on the Floor (1971, as Joe Brown)
- Hottest Room in the House (1971, as Jeremy Crebb)
- A Miss Guided (1971, as Anonymous)
- Pleasure Us! (1971, as John Cleve)
- Pussy Island (1971, as John Cleve)
- The Second Coming (1971, as John Cleve)
- The Sex Pill (1971, as J. X. Williams)
- Belly to Belly (1972, as Jack Cory)
- Diana's Dirty Doings (1972, as Jeff Morehead)
- Different Positions! (1972, as Jack Cory)
- Family "Secrets" (1972, as John Cleve)
- High School Swingers (1972, as Jack Cory)
- Peggy Wants It! (1972, as Jeff Morehead)
- Snatch Me! (1972, as John Cleve)
- Wet Dreams (1972, as John Cleve)
- The Wife Who Liked to Watch! (1972, as Jeff Morehead)
- Ball in the Family! (1973, as Jeff Morehead)
- The Domination of Camille (1973, as John Cleve) (reissued as Tame Me! (1975, as Camille Colben))
- Family Secrets (different work from the similar 1972 title) (1973, as John Cleve)
- The Farm Girl & the Hired Hand (1973, as Jeff Morehead)
- Holly Would (1973, as John Cleve)
- Losing It (1973, as John Denis)
- Never Enough (1973, as John Denis)
- The Palace of Venus (1973, as John Denis)
- S as in Sensuous (1973, as John Denis)
- Sex Doctor (1973, as John Denis)
- Tight Fit (1973, as John Denis)
- Every Inch a Man (1974, as John Cleve)
- The Fires Down Below (1974, as Jeff Woodson)
- A Vacation in the Erogenous Zones! (1974, as John Cleve)
- The Sexorcist (1974, as John Cleve) (reissued as Unholy Revelry (1976, as John Cleve)
- Asking For It! (1975, as Turk Winter)
- Beg For It! (1975, as Turk Winter)
- A Degraded Heroine (1975, as Turk Winter)
- The Domination of Ann (1975, as John Cleve)
- A Family Ball (1975, as Jeff Morehead)
- Family Bonds (1975, as Turk Winter)
- The Governess (1975, with Eric Stanton, as by Stanton and John Cleve)
- His Loving Sister (1975, as Jeff Morehead)
- Horny Daughter-In-Law (1975, as Jeff Morehead)
- Mother's Four Lovers (1975, as Jeff Morehead)
- The Punisher Publisher (1975, with Eric Stanton, as by Stanton and John Cleve)
- Beautiful Bitch (1976, as John Cleve)
- Disciplined! (1976, as Jeff Morehead)
- The Erogenous Zone (1976, as John Cleve)
- Succulent Line-Up (1976, as John Cleve)
- Serena, Darling (1976, as John Cleve)
- The Submission of Claudine (1976, as Turk Winter)
- Triple Play! (1976, as Jeff Morehead)
- Forced to Please (1977, as Jeff Morehead)
- Rosalind Does it All (1977, as Jeff Morehead)
- Her Pleasure Potion (1978, as Turk Winter)
- The Look of Lust (1978, as Jeff Morehead)
- Mark of the Master (1980, as Turk Winter)
- Lady Beth, by A Woman of Quality (1984, as Anonymous, as edited by John Cleve)

==== Non-fiction works ====
- The Complete Couple (1976, as John Cleve, with Jane Cleve)
