= Robert Asprin =

American science fiction and fantasy author (1946–2008)

Robert Lynn Asprin
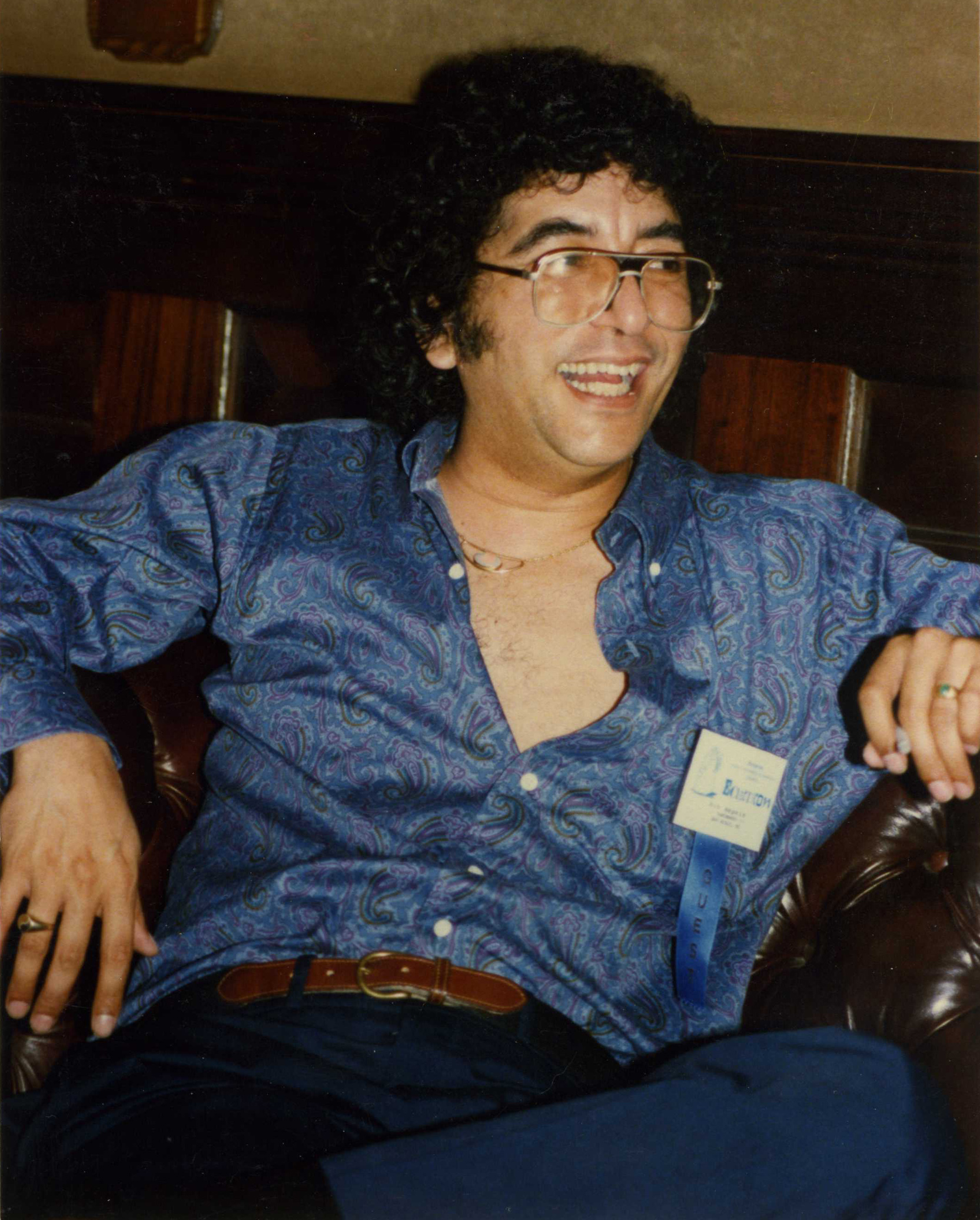
- Asprin in 1993
- Born: June 28, 1946; St. Johns, Michigan, U.S.
- Died: May 22, 2008 (aged 61); New Orleans, Louisiana, U.S.
- Education: University of Michigan
- Occupation: Fiction writer
- Writing career
- Pen name: Bob Asprin
- Period: 1977–2008
- Genres: Science fiction, fantasy
- Notable awards: Inkpot Award (1988)

Robert Lynn Asprin (June 28, 1946 – May 22, 2008) was an American science fiction and fantasy author and active fan, known best for his humorous series MythAdventures and Phule's Company.

== Background ==
Robert Asprin was born in St. Johns, Michigan, and attended the University of Michigan at Ann Arbor, Michigan from 1964 through 1965. From 1965 through 1966 he served in the United States Army. He was married, twice, and had two children. He was active in science fiction fandom and in the early years of the Society for Creative Anachronism using the name "Yang the Nauseating", and co-initiated the society Great Dark Horde during 1971. He was also the initiator and an influential member of the Dorsai Irregulars. In 1976, he was nominated for the Hugo Award for Best Dramatic Presentation for The Capture, a cartoon slide show written by Asprin and drawn by Phil Foglio.

== Early writing ==
Asprin's first novel, The Cold Cash War, an expansion of an earlier short story of the same title, was published in 1977.

During the next few years, he created and edited (with his then-wife, Lynn Abbey) the Thieves' World series of shared world anthologies, credited as the first project of its type. Many of the included authors later produced novels and stories of the theme which were not included in the anthologies, beginning with Beyond Sanctuary by Janet Morris, the first "authorized" Thieves World novel, published in 1985. Janet Morris and Chris Morris later produced two more authorized Thieves' World novels and a series of related novels about their character Tempus and the Sacred Band of Stepsons. A series of graphic novels followed during the mid-1980s, and several other authors, including Andrew J. Offutt and David Drake, published novels about their characters. In 2002, Lynn Abbey revived the series with the novel Sanctuary.

During 1978, Asprin began the "MythAdventures" series, chronicling the comic adventures of Skeeve and Aahz, with the book Another Fine Myth. Illustrated originally by Frank Kelly Freas, and later by Phil Foglio, the pun-rich books concern a "demon" magician who has lost his powers and his inexperienced human apprentice as they travel through a variety of worlds. Some of the early "Myth" novels were adapted later as comic books by Foglio and others. The Myth books have been published by three publishing companies over the years: Donning Starblaze, Meisha Merlin and, as of 2008, Wildside Press.

During the 1990s, Asprin's "Phule" novels concerned the humorous science-fiction exploits of a rag-tag "Space Legion" and its wealthy and iconoclastic commander, Willard Phule.

== Hiatus in writing career ==
Due to a series of personal and financial problems, Asprin published little during the 1990s, although he had two books on The New York Times Best Seller list, which piqued the interest of fans and the Internal Revenue Service. He eventually negotiated an agreement with the IRS that encouraged him to resume writing, and during the early 2000s he published several novels, mostly in collaboration with authors Peter Heck, Jody Lynn Nye, and Linda Evans. These novels included continuations of the series "Myth Adventures" and "Phule's Company" as well as works of new series.

== Later work ==
One of Asprin's last projects was NO Quarter, originally co-authored with Eric Del Carlo, and later edited by Teresa Patterson. It is a dark fantasy/suspense/murder mystery novel set in the author's beloved New Orleans French Quarter. Although the novel's fantasy elements (voodoo and black magic, tarot readings and precognition, ghosts and mysticism) are secondary to the brutal murder that is the emphasis of the plot, it is set in the same milieu as Asprin's Griffen McCandles novels (Dragons series), Dragons Luck and Dragons Wild. The two protagonists of NO Quarter, Maestro and Bone, also appear as minor characters of the Dragons novels. Maestro, the mysterious professional pool player and fencing master in NO Quarter, is fictionalized but based recognizably on the author. NO Quarter was published November 2009 by DarkStar Books.

Asprin's ofttimes co-author, Jody Lynn Nye, has completed one further Griffen McCandles novel, Dragons Deal, and continued the Myth Adventures series. Dragons Deal was published by Ace in December 2010.

== Death and aftermath ==
Asprin died on May 22, 2008, of heart failure at his home in New Orleans. He was found lying on a sofa with a Terry Pratchett novel still open in his hands. He was to have been the Guest of Honor at Marcon that weekend.

During 2008, his heirs donated his archive to the department of Rare Books and Special Collections at Northern Illinois University.

== Partial bibliography ==
=== Myth Adventures series ===
- Another Fine Myth (1978)
- Myth Conceptions (1980)
- Myth Directions (1982)
- Hit or Myth (1983)
- Myth-ing Persons (1984)
- Little Myth Marker (1985)
- M.Y.T.H. Inc. Link (1986)
- Myth-Nomers and Im-Pervections (1987)
- M.Y.T.H. Inc. in Action (1990)
- Sweet Myth-tery of Life (1993)
- Myth-Ion Improbable (2001) set chronologically between Myth Directions and Hit or Myth
- Something M.Y.T.H. Inc. (2002)
- Myth-Told Tales (2003) with Jody Lynn Nye. The book is a collection of short stories including both new and previously written works.
- Myth Alliances (2003) with Jody Lynn Nye
- Myth-taken Identity (2004) with Jody Lynn Nye
- Class Dis-Mythed (2005) with Jody Lynn Nye
- Myth-Gotten Gains (2006) with Jody Lynn Nye
- Myth-Chief (2008) with Jody Lynn Nye
- Myth-Fortunes (2008) with Jody Lynn Nye
- Myth-Interpretations (2011) short fiction collection - contains all the Myth stories of less-than-novel length, as well as other short works by Asprin
- Myth-Fits (stylised as Robert Asprin's Myth-Fits) (2016) by Jody Lynn Nye

==== Omnibus editions ====
- MYTH Adventures (1984)
- Myth Adventures One (Another Fine Myth, Myth Conceptions) (1985)
- Myth Alliances (Myth-ing Persons, Little Myth Marker, M.Y.T.H. Inc. Link) (1986)
- The MYTH-ing Omnibus (Another Fine Myth, Myth Conceptions, Myth Directions) (1992)
- The Second MYTH-ing Omnibus (1992)
- M.Y.T.H. Inc. in Action / Sweet Myth-Tery of Life (2002)
- M.Y.T.H. Inc. Link / Myth-Nomers and Im-Pervections (2002)
- Myth Adventures Three (2002)
- Myth-ing Persons / Little Myth Marker (2002)
- Robert Asprin's Myth Adventures Volume One (Books 1–6) (July 2006)
- Robert Asprin's Myth Adventures Volume Two (Books 7–12) (January 2007)

=== Duncan and Mallory series ===
A series of three graphic novels published by Starblaze Graphics.

- Duncan and Mallory (1986) with Mel White
- The Bar None Ranch (1987) with Mel White
- The Raiders (1988) with Mel White

=== Phule's Company series ===
- Phule's Company (1990)
- Phule's Paradise (1992)
- A Phule and His Money (1999) with Peter J. Heck
- Phule Me Twice (2000) with Peter J. Heck
- No Phule Like an Old Phule (2004) with Peter J. Heck
- Phule's Errand (2006) with Peter J. Heck

=== Time Scout series ===
- Time Scout (1995) with Linda Evans
- Wagers of Sin (1996) with Linda Evans
- Ripping Time (2000) with Linda Evans
- The House that Jack Built (2001) with Linda Evans

=== Cold Cash series ===
- The Cold Cash War (1977)
- Cold Cash Warrior (1989) with Bill Fawcett

=== Wartorn series ===
- Resurrection (2004) with Eric Del Carlo
- Obliteration (2006) with Eric Del Carlo

=== Griffen McCandles (Dragons) series ===
- Dragons Wild (April 2008), ISBN 0-441-01470-4
- Dragons Luck (April 2009), ISBN 0-441-01680-4
- Dragons Deal (December 2010) with Jody Lynn Nye, ISBN 978-0-441-01926-7
- Robert Asprin's Dragons Run (October 2013) sole author: Jody Lyn Nye, ISBN 978-0-425-25697-8

=== Other novels ===
- Tambu (1979)
- The Bug Wars (1979)
- Mirror Friend, Mirror Foe (1979) with George Takei
- Catwoman: Tiger Hunt (1992) with Lynn Abbey
- For King and Country (July 2002) with Linda Evans, ISBN 0-7434-3539-7
- E.Godz (March 2005) with Esther M Friesner, ISBN 0-7434-9888-7
- NO Quarter (October 2009) with Eric Del Carlo and Teresa Patterson, ISBN 978-0-9819866-0-9
- License Invoked (February 2001) with Jody Lynn Nye, ISBN 0-671-31978-7

=== Selected short fiction ===
- "The Ex-Khan" in Angels in Hell (1987), part of the Heroes in Hell series
- "Two Gentlemen of the Trade" in Festival Moon (1987), part of the Merovingen Nights series
- "A Harmless Excursion" in Smugglers Gold (1988), also from Merovingen Nights
- "Mything in Dreamland" with Jody Lynn Nye in Masters of Fantasy (2004), part of the Myth series

=== Editor ===
==== Thieves' World series ====
- Thieves' World (1979)
- Tales from the Vulgar Unicorn (1980)
- Shadows of Sanctuary (1981)
- Storm Season (1982)
- The Face of Chaos (1983)
- Wings of Omen (1984)
- The Dead of Winter (1985)
- Soul of the City (1986)
- Blood Ties (1986)
- Aftermath (1987)
- Uneasy Alliances (1988)
- Stealers' Sky (1989)

=== Other writing ===
- The Capture, cartoon slide show written by Asprin and illustrated by Phil Foglio; nominated for a 1976 Hugo Award
