= Lynn Abbey =

American computer programmer and author

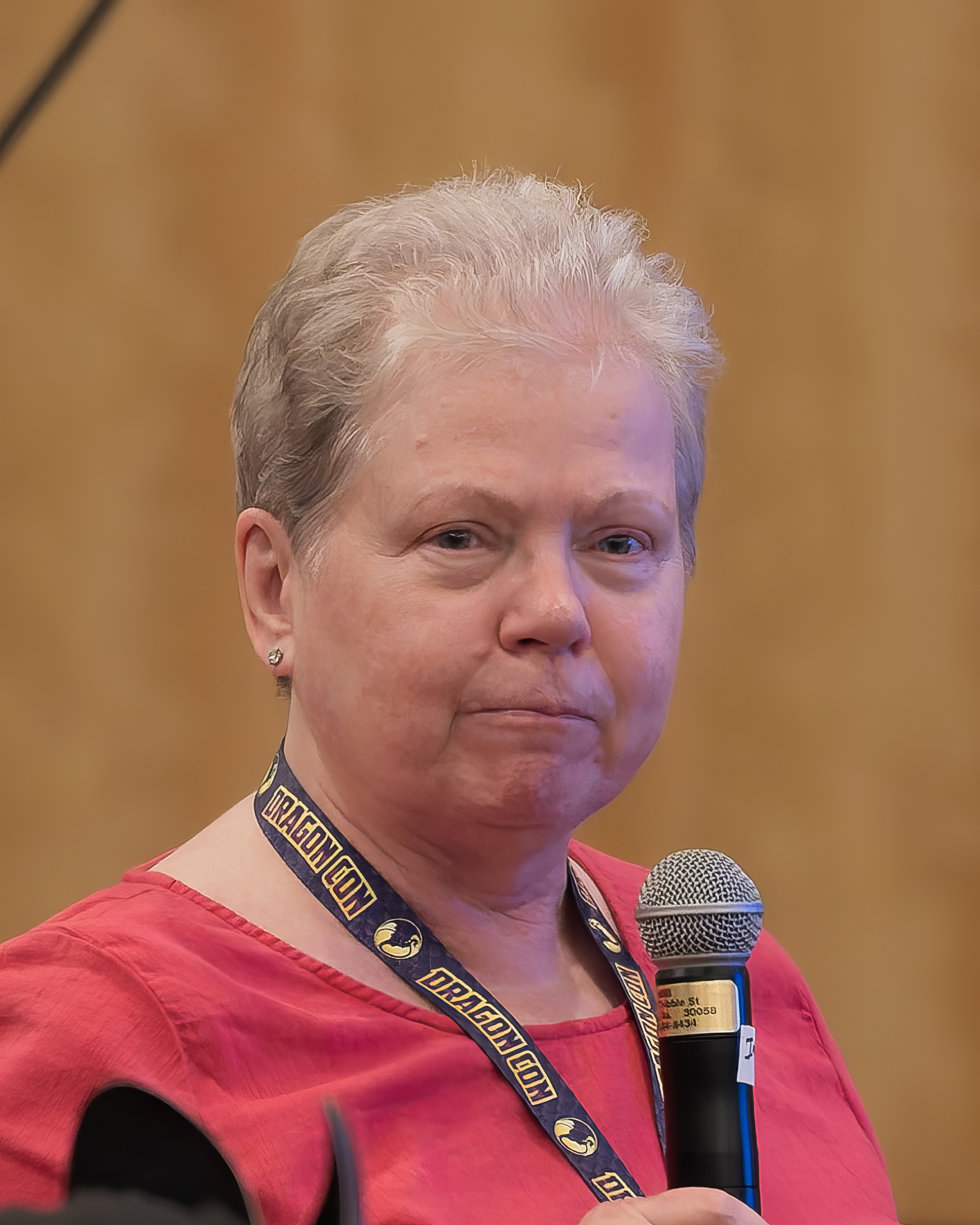
- Abbey at Dragon Con in 2026
- Born: Marilyn Lorraine Abbey; September 18, 1948 (age 77); Peekskill, New York, U.S.
- Education: University of Rochester (BA, MA)
- Occupation: Author
- Spouse: Robert Asprin (to 1993)

Marilyn Lorraine "Lynn" Abbey (born September 18, 1948) is an American fantasy author.

== Background ==
Lynn Abbey was born in Peekskill, New York. She attended the University of Rochester, where she began as an astrophysics major. She earned a A.B. (1969) and an M.A. (1971) in European history, but shifted to computer programming as a profession "when my advisor pointed out that, given the natural rise and fall of demographic curves, tenured university faculty positions were going to be as scarce as hen's teeth for the next twenty-five years and my education was turning into an expensive hobby. (He was right, too.)" She had married Ralph Dressler July 14, 1969; they were divorced October 31, 1972. During this period she also became a member of science fiction fandom.

== Michigan accident and aftermath ==
In 1976, after a stint as a programmer for insurance companies, and work on the state task force involved in documenting the New York City bankruptcy crisis, she moved to Ann Arbor, Michigan. In January 1977, she was injured in an automobile accident while going to pick up Gordon R. Dickson, who was to be a Guest of Honor at that year's ConFusion. The guilt-ridden Dickson volunteered to assist her by reading and critiquing her work (she'd been writing since childhood). The manuscript he helped her with became Daughter of the Bright Moon.

== Publication and marriage ==
Abbey began publishing in 1979 with Daughter of the Bright Moon and the short story "The Face of Chaos," in Thieves' World, the first part of the Thieves' World shared world anthology.

On August 28, 1982, she married Robert Asprin, editor of the Thieves' World books, and became his co-editor. She also contributed to other shared world series during the 1980s, including Heroes in Hell and Merovingen Nights.

She began writing for TSR, Inc. around 1994 while continuing to write novels and edit anthologies. Her works for TSR include stories set in the Forgotten Realms and the Dark Sun settings. Lynn Abbey wrote for TSR's Dark Sun series starting with The Brazen Gambit. Further novels in the series include The Rise and Fall of a Dragon King, a novel exploring the topic of genocide, a central theme in the ancient history of Athas, the world on which the Dark Sun setting takes place. Along with Cinnabar Shadows, all three of Abbey's books written for the Athasian setting take place in and around the City-state of Urik.

== Divorce and moves ==
Abbey and Asprin divorced in 1993 and Abbey moved to Oklahoma City. She continued to write novels during this period, including original works as well as tie-ins to role playing games for TSR. In 2002, she returned to Thieves' World with the novel Sanctuary and also began editing new anthologies, beginning with Turning Points. In 2006, she was a writer on Green Ronin's version of Thieves' World. She has lived in Leesburg, Florida since 1997.
