= Orfi =

Orfi may refer to:

== People ==
- Amina Orfi (born 2007), Egyptian squash player
- Hocine El Orfi (born 1987), Algerian football player
- Orfi (magician), Bulgarian illusionist
- 'Orfi Shirazi (1555–1591), Persian poet

== Places ==
- Orfi, Mashhad, Iran

== See also ==
- Urfi (disambiguation)
