= Silistra =

Silistra Силистра Silistre Silistra, Dârstor
- Town
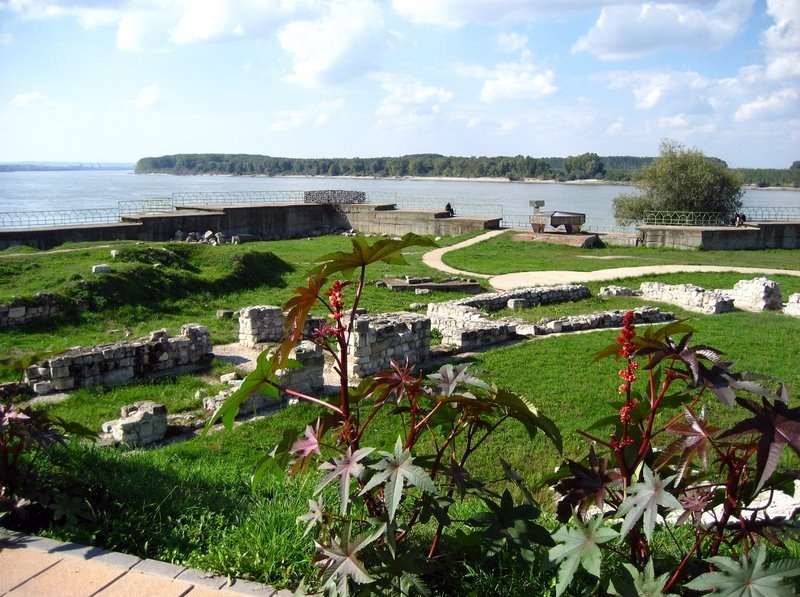
- View of the river Danube

- Flag Coat of arms

- Location of Silistra
- Coordinates: 44°07′02″N 27°15′38″E
- Country: Bulgaria
- Province (Oblast): Silistra

Government
  - Mayor: Alexander Sabanov

Area
  - Town: 27.159 km^{2} (10.486 sq mi)
- Elevation: 6 m (20 ft)

Population (2021)
  - Town: 29,498
  - Density: 1,086.1/km^{2} (2,813.0/sq mi)
  - Urban: 43,265
- Time zone: UTC+2 (EET)
  - Summer (DST): UTC+3 (EEST)
- Postal Code: 7500
- Area code: 086
- Climate: Cfa
- Website: Official website

Silistra (Bulgarian: Силистра [siˈlistrɐ]; Turkish: Silistre; Romanian: Silistra or Dârstor) is a town in Northeastern Bulgaria. The town lies on the southern bank of the lower Danube river, and is also the part of the Romanian border where it stops following the Danube. Silistra is the administrative center of the Silistra Province and one of the important towns of the historical region of Dobruja.

Silistra is a major cultural, industrial, transportation, and educational center of Northeastern Bulgaria. There are many historical landmarks including a richly-decorated Late Roman tomb, remains of the medieval fortress, an Ottoman fort, and an art gallery.

== Etymology ==
The name Silistra is possibly derived from the root of "Istrum" (Ίστρος in Ancient Greek), the old Thracian name of the lower part of the Danube.

The name of the city is given as Silistria in the Encyclopædia Britannica Eleventh Edition.

== Geography ==
Silistra is in the northeastern part of Bulgaria on the southern bank of the Danube River. It is located in the Bulgarian part of Dobruja.

The municipality of Silistra covers an area of 516 km^{2} (199 sq mi) and includes the town and 18 villages. The area of the city proper is 27.159 km^{2} (10.486 sq mi).

Silistra is 431 km (268 mi) from Sofia, the capital of Bulgaria; 141 km (88 mi) from Varna; and 119 km (74 mi) from Ruse.

=== Climate ===
Silistra has a temperate climate, with cold snowy winters and hot summers.

Climate data for Silistra (normals 2005-2013)
Month	Jan	Feb	Mar	Apr	May	Jun	Jul	Aug	Sep	Oct	Nov	Dec	Year
Mean daily maximum °C (°F)	3.2 (37.8)	4.7 (40.5)	11.9 (53.4)	18.0 (64.4)	23.9 (75.0)	27.9 (82.2)	30.1 (86.2)	30.0 (86.0)	23.9 (75.0)	17.1 (62.8)	11.1 (52.0)	5.0 (41.0)	17.2 (63.0)
Daily mean °C (°F)	0.6 (33.1)	1.6 (34.9)	7.7 (45.9)	13.3 (55.9)	19.0 (66.2)	22.9 (73.2)	25.1 (77.2)	24.8 (76.6)	19.4 (66.9)	13.2 (55.8)	8.1 (46.6)	2.6 (36.7)	13.2 (55.8)
Mean daily minimum °C (°F)	−2.1 (28.2)	−1.5 (29.3)	3.4 (38.1)	8.7 (47.7)	14.1 (57.4)	18.0 (64.4)	20.1 (68.2)	19.7 (67.5)	14.8 (58.6)	9.6 (49.3)	5.0 (41.0)	0.3 (32.5)	9.2 (48.5)
Average precipitation mm (inches)	51.0 (2.01)	26.5 (1.04)	22.8 (0.90)	39.0 (1.54)	51.5 (2.03)	64.2 (2.53)	45.8 (1.80)	48.7 (1.92)	43.8 (1.72)	45.2 (1.78)	23.5 (0.93)	51.4 (2.02)	513.4 (20.22)
Average snowfall cm (inches)	19.88 (7.83)	12.27 (4.83)	6.32 (2.49)	0.29 (0.11)	0 (0)	0 (0)	0 (0)	0 (0)	0 (0)	0.25 (0.10)	4.68 (1.84)	9.65 (3.80)	53.34 (21)
Average precipitation days (≥ 0.1 mm)	10.1	8.8	8.1	8.4	10.1	8.9	6.3	4.8	6.6	7.4	6.1	9.9	95.5
Average snowy days	6.8	6.4	2.9	0	0	0	0	0	0	0.1	0.9	4.6	21.7
Source 1: Meteomanz
Source 2: Open-Meteo (Snowfall 2000-2024)

== History ==
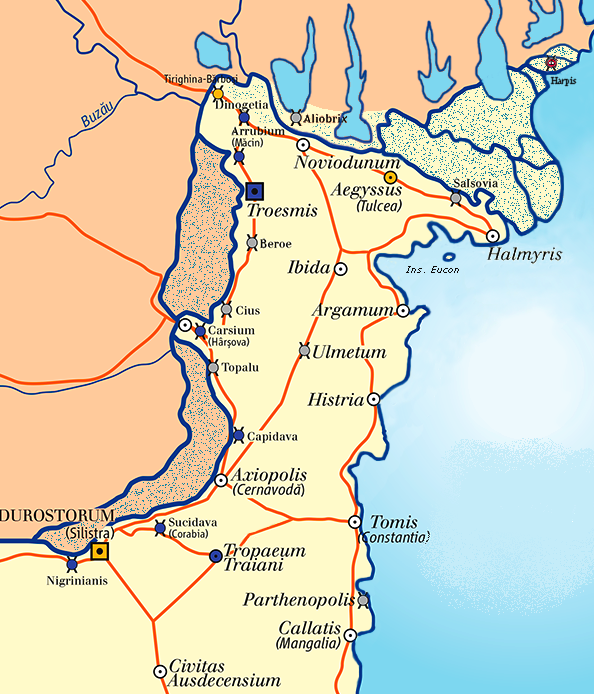
Eastern Moesia and Limes Moesiae

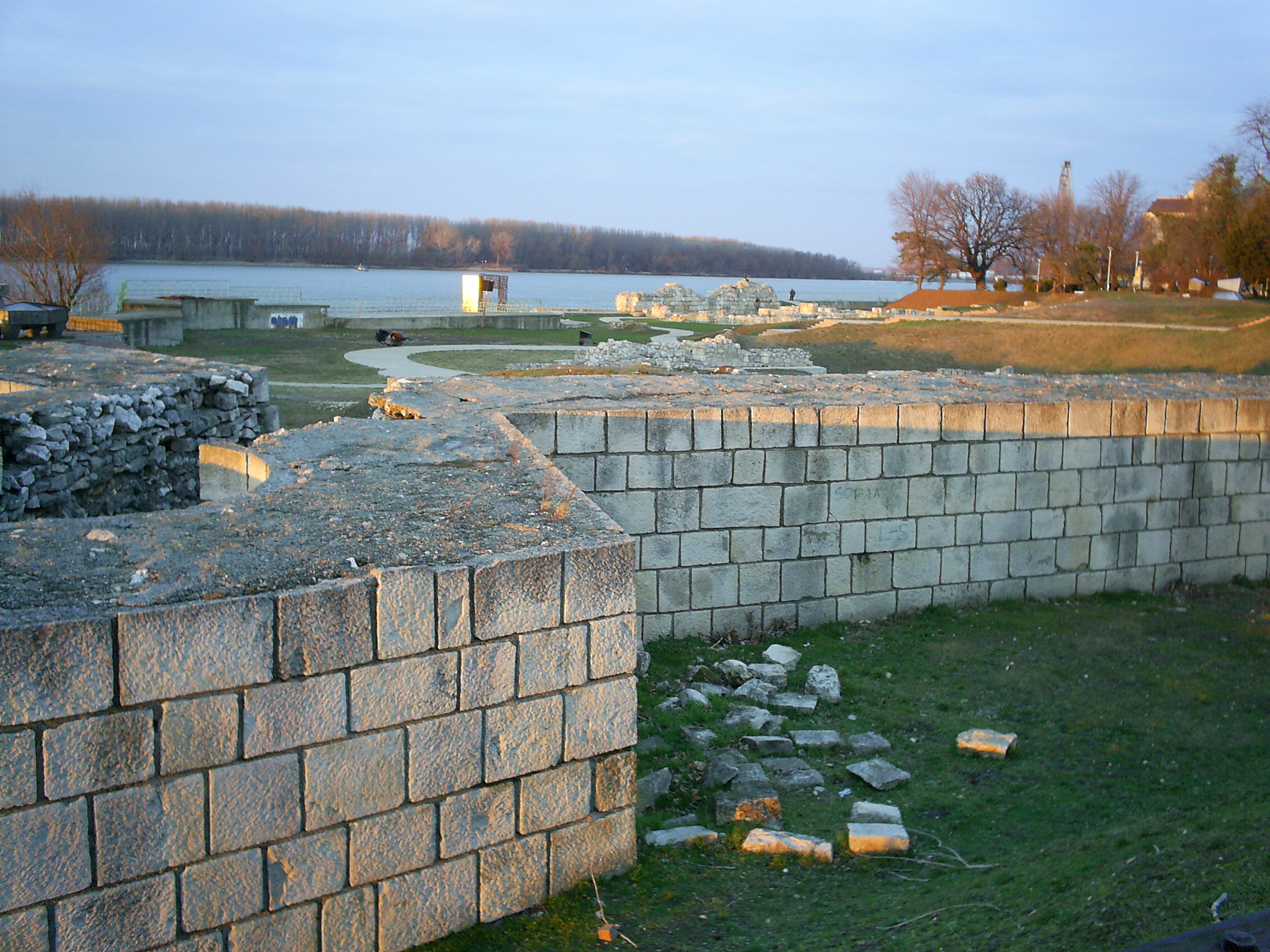
Durostorum

After the Roman province of Moesia was founded in 12 AD, the Romans built a fort in 29 on the site of an earlier Thracian settlement and kept its name, Durostorum (or Dorostorum). During the reigns of Claudius (41-54 AD) and Nero (54-68), the eastern border of Moesia was extended to the mouth of the river Iatrus (the modern Yantra). Durostorum was one of several important river points along the Moesian Limes frontier. After Trajan's Dacian Wars the fort was enlarged into a legionary fortress for the Legio XI Claudia who stayed there from before 114 until c. 400. It became an important military centre of the Roman province of Moesia, and grew into a city at the time of Marcus Aurelius. The city was strongly affected by an invasion of the Costoboci in 170.

Large thermal baths have been discovered in the canabae and residential buildings to the south. There were six periods of construction between the 2nd and 4th centuries AD.

When the Roman Empire split into the Eastern and Western empires, the town became part of the Eastern Roman Empire.

Durostorum became the seat of a Christian bishopric and a centre of Christianity in the region. The earliest saints of Bulgaria are Roman soldiers executed at Durostorum during the Diocletian Persecution (303–313), including St. Dasius and St. Julius the Veteran. Auxentius was expelled from Durostorum by an edict of Theodosius depriving Arian bishops in 383, and took refuge at Milan where he became embroiled in controversy with St Ambrose. The Roman general Flavius Aëtius was born in the town in 396.

As part of the Bulgarian Empire Durostolon was known as Drastar in medieval times.

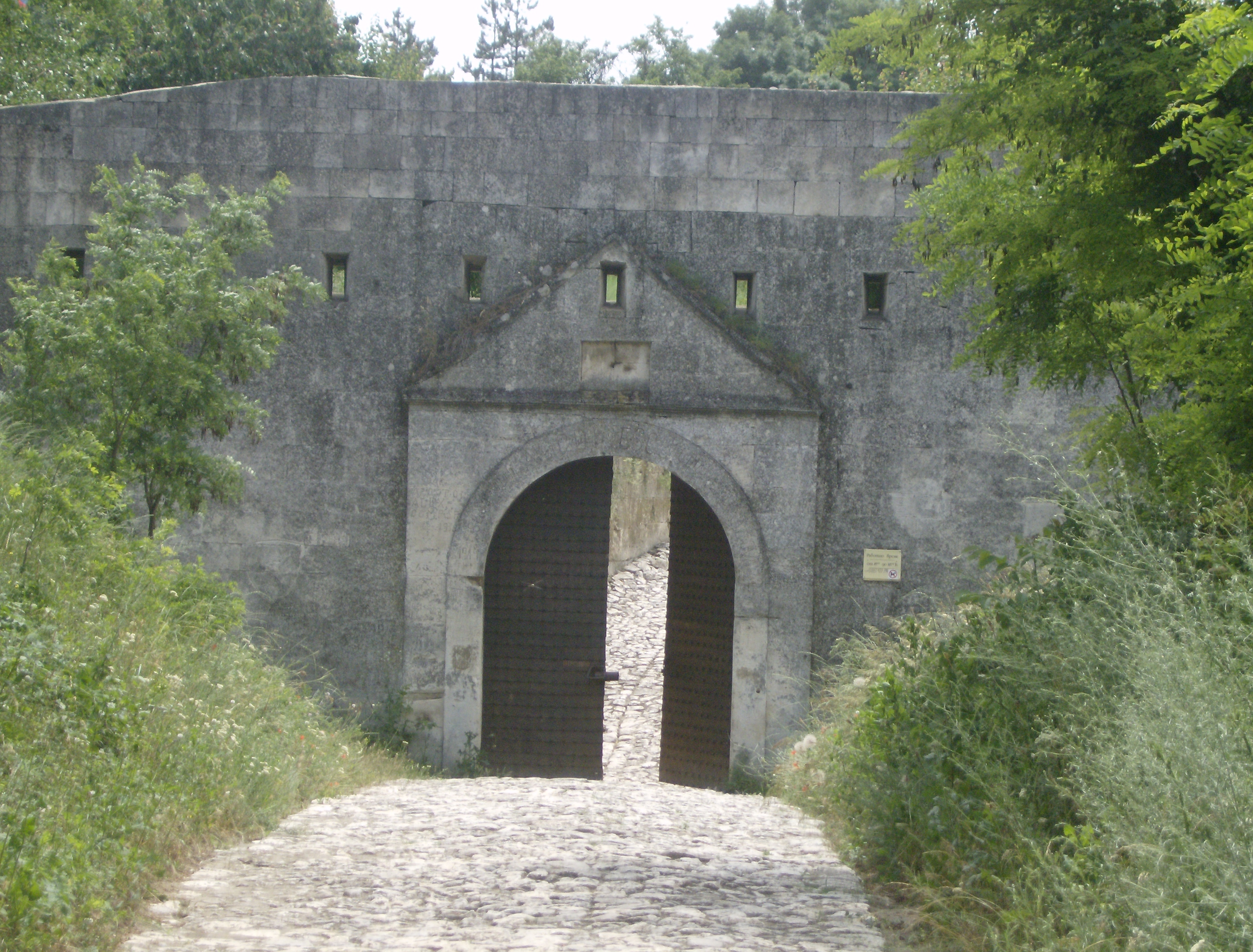
The fort of Silistra

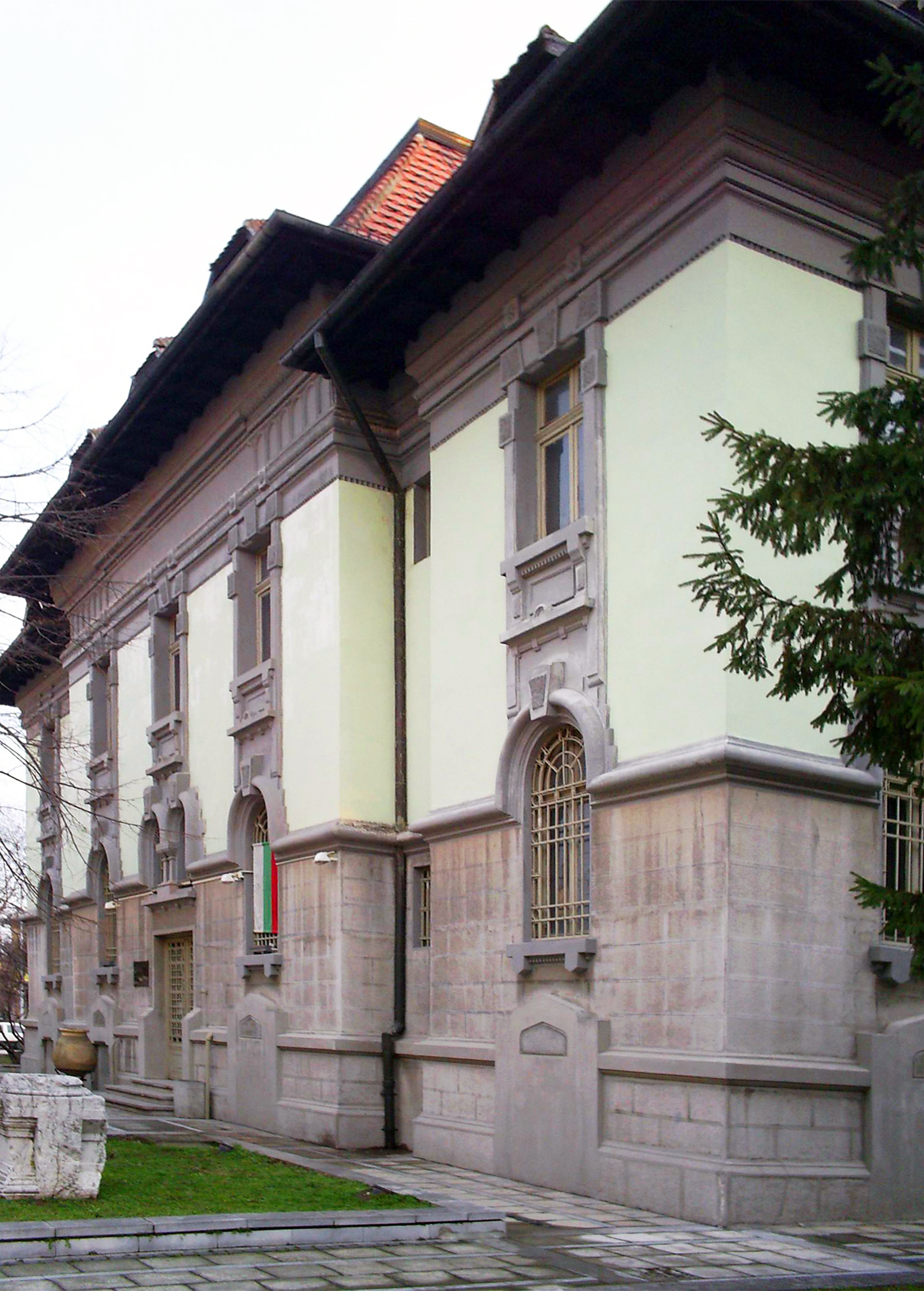
Silistra Historical Museum

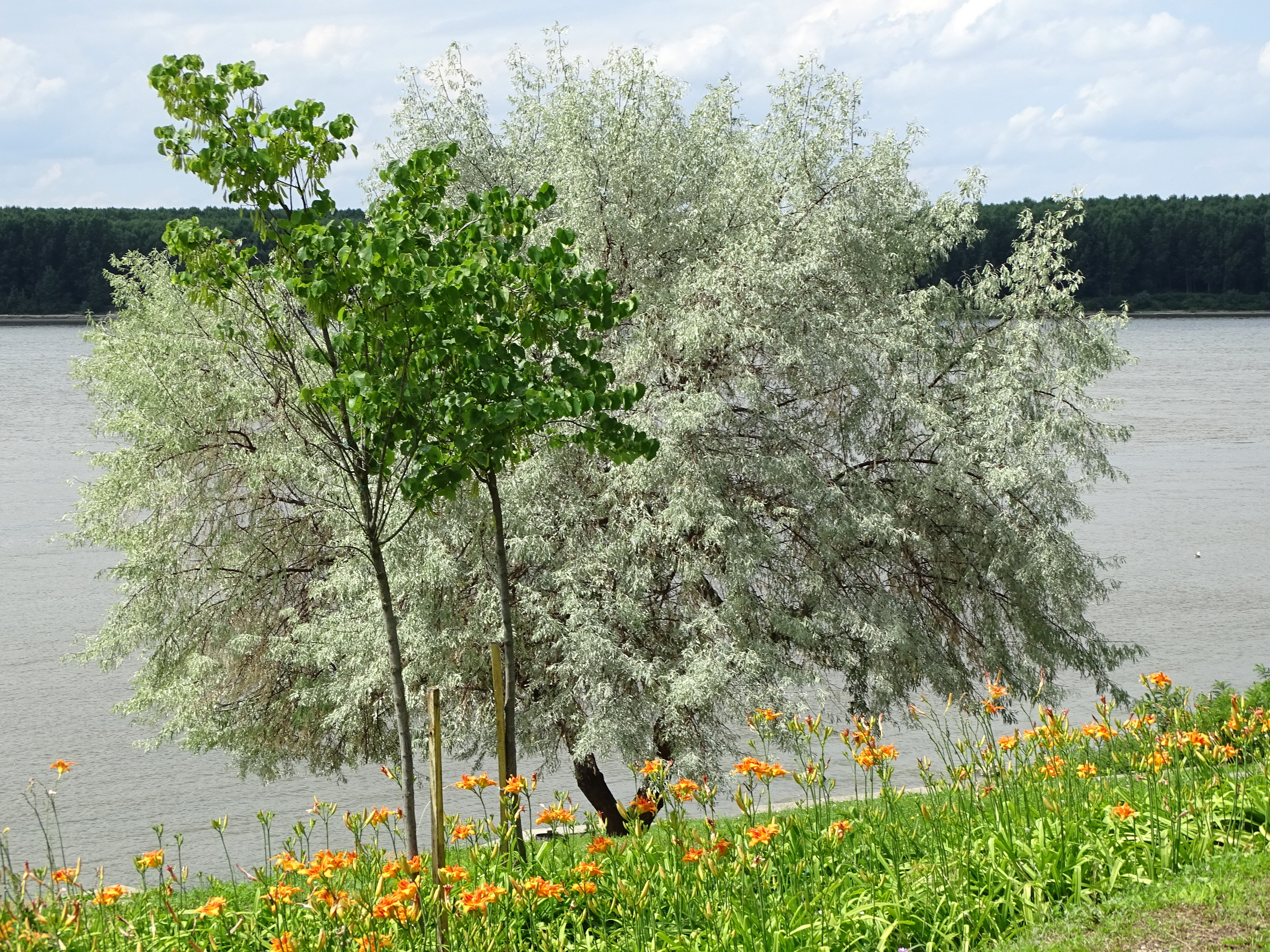
Dunavska Gradina Park

Around the end of the 7th century, the town was incorporated into the First Bulgarian Empire and the bishop of Drastar (Дръстър in Bulgarian) was proclaimed the first patriarch of Bulgaria. In 895 (during the Bulgarian-Hungarian War of 894–896), the Hungarians, allies of the Byzantines, besieged the Bulgarian army under the personal command of Simeon I the Great in the fortress of the town but were repulsed. The next year the Hungarians were decisively defeated in the battle of Southern Buh.

The town was captured by the forces of Sviatoslav I of Kiev in 969, but two years later it was taken by the Byzantines during the Battle of Dorostolon. In 976, Tsar Samuel restored Bulgarian rule in the region until 1001, when it once again became part of the Byzantine Empire as Dristra. Emperor Alexios I Komnenos suffered a defeat at Dristra to the Pechenegs in 1087.

In 1186, after the Rebellion of Asen and Peter, the town became part of the Second Bulgarian Empire and renamed Drastar.

In 1279, under Emperor Ivailo, Drastar was attacked by the Mongols; but after a three-month-long siege the Bulgarians managed to break through. The town remained part of the Bulgarian Empire until the Ottoman conquest of the Balkans around 1400. Throughout the Middle Ages, Drastar (possibly known by the name Silistra too) was among Bulgaria's largest and most important cities.

During Ottoman rule, Silistra (Ottoman Turkish: Silistre) was part of Rumelia Province and was the administrative centre of the Silistra district (sanjak). This district was later upgraded to become the Silistra Province and stretched over most of the western Black Sea littoral. In 1570 (Hijri 977) the town of Silistra was inhabited by Muslims and Christians. It had 447 Muslim households in 20 neighbourhoods and 633 Non-muslim households in 15 neighbourhoods. The defter also recorded that there was a Jewish and a Christian Romani congregation.

The town was captured and recaptured by Russian forces numerous times during several Russo-Turkish Wars and was besieged between 14 April and 23 June 1854 during the Crimean War. Namık Kemal wrote his most famous play, Vatan Yahut Silistre ("Homeland or Silistre"), a drama about the siege of Silistra (Silistria), in which he expounded on the ideas of patriotism and liberalism. The play was first staged on 1 April 1873 and led to his exile to Famagusta.

The Ottoman Silistra Province was reduced in size, as the districts of Özi and Hocabey and the region of Bessarabia were ceded to the Russian Empire at the end of the 18th century and the beginning of the 19th century. Edirne Province was created from its southern regions in 1830. Finally, Silistra Province merged with the provinces of Vidin and Niš in 1864 to form Danube Province. Silistra was downgraded to a kaza centre in Ruse district in this province in the same year.

Between 1819 and 1826, Eliezer Papo — a renowned Jewish scholar — was the rabbi of the community of Silistra, making this town famous among observant Jews. Up to the present, his grave is a focus of pilgrimage, some pilgrims flying from Israel and even from Latin America to Bulgaria for that purpose.

In 1878, following the Russo-Turkish War of 1877–1878, Silistra was included in Bulgaria. Romania was opposed to this as it wanted to acquire the city and established the short-lived Silistra Nouă County, which was abolished a year later.

In May 1913, as the First Balkan War was winding down, tensions between Bulgaria and both Greece and Serbia that ultimately led to the Second Balkan War were escalating and after unsuccessful negotiations between Bulgaria and Romania in London, the two countries accepted the mediation of the Great Powers, who awarded Silistra and the area in a 3 km radius around it to Romania at the Saint Petersburg Conference. The 1913 Treaty of Bucharest following the Second Balkan War confirmed Romanian possession of Silistra and moved the border further away, with Bulgaria ceding the whole of Southern Dobruja to Romania which had conquered it during the war. Bulgaria regained de facto control of the town in 1916 during World War I. This became finalised with the Treaty of Bucharest in 1918 after Romania surrendered to the Central Powers (of which Bulgaria was a part). The Treaty of Neuilly (1919) following World War I returned Silistra and the rest of Dobruja to Romania. The town remained a part of Romania until the Axis-sponsored Treaty of Craiova in 1940, when Southern Dobruja including Silistra once again became part of Bulgaria, a transfer confirmed by the Paris Peace Treaties in 1947. Between 1913 and 1938, Silistra was the capital of Durostor County (except during Bulgarian rule). It became part of Ținutul Mării ("Sea District") between 1938 and 1940 during Romanian rule. Following the establishment of the People's Republic of Bulgaria, Silistra developed as a center of industry and agriculture in the region, comparable to Ruse (because of the strategic position on the Danube) and Dobrich (due to the abundant fertile lands). This led to a major population increase which continued until 1985. After that, the population slowly started to decrease. Following the collapse of the People's Republic in 1989, many of its inhabitants migrated to other parts of the country or emigrated outside Bulgaria.

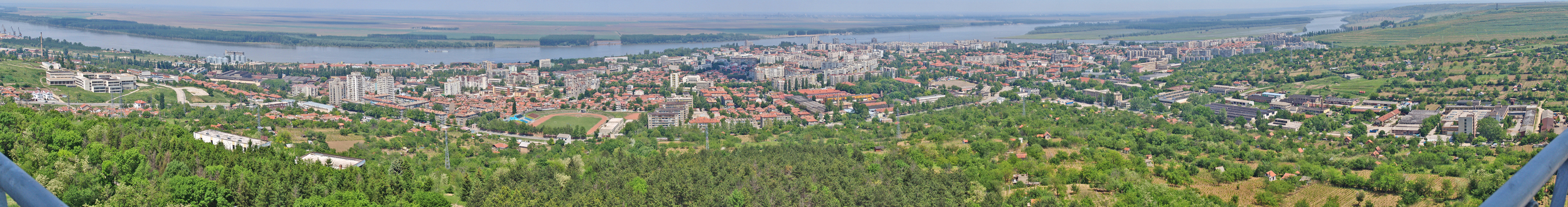
A panorama of Silistra and the Danube

== Population ==
In January 2012, Silistra was inhabited by 35,230 people within the city limits, while the Silistra Municipality along with the legally affiliated adjacent villages had 50,780 inhabitants. The number of the residents of the city (not the municipality) reached its peak in the period 1986–1991, when it exceeded 70,000. The following table presents the change of the population after 1887.

Silistra
Year	1887	1910	1934	1946	1956	1965	1975	1985	1992	2001	2005	2009	2011	2021
Population	11,415	11,046	> 17,415^{[a]}	15,951	20,350	33,041	59,296	70,537	49,304	41,952	39,358	37,837	35,607	29,498
	Highest number 70,537 in 1985													
Sources: National Statistical Institute, citypopulation.de, pop-stat.mashke.org, Bulgarian Academy of Sciences a. Population in 1930: 17,415

=== Ethnic, linguistic and religious composition ===
According to the latest 2011 census data, the individuals declared their ethnic identity were distributed as follows:

- Bulgarians: 29,677 (88.3%)
- Turks: 3,458 (10.3%)
- Romani: 123 (0.4%)
- Others: 190 (0.6%)
- Indefinable: 180 (0.5%)
  - Undeclared: 1,979 (5.6%)

Total: 35,607

== Notable people ==
- Flavius Aetius (396–454), a Roman general, defeated Attila the Hun
- Parteniy Pavlovich (c. 1695–1760), cleric, author of the first autobiography in South Slavic literature
- Süleyman Hilmi Tunahan (1888–1959), Islamic scholar and mystic
- Marcel Dinu (1935–2019), Romanian diplomat
- Orfi (1943–1999), magician
- Yıldız İbrahimova (1952–), jazz singer
- Veselin Metodiev (1957–), former minister of culture
- Denislav Kalchev (1973–), swimmer

== Twin towns – sister cities ==
Silistra is twinned with:

- Veles, North Macedonia
- Dunaújváros, Hungary
- Dresden, Germany
- Leskovac, Serbia
- Lüleburgaz, Turkey
- Slobozia, Romania
- Lida, Belarus
- Óbuda-Békásmegyer, Hungary

== Honour ==
Silistra Knoll on Livingston Island in the South Shetland Islands, Antarctica is named after Silistra.

"Silistra" is also the name of a fictional planet in Janet Morris' book High Couch of Silistra (1977).
