= Urfi (disambiguation) =

Urfi Shirazi (1555–1591) was a Persian poet.

Urfi or Orfi may also refer to:

- Nikah 'urfi, a system of Islamic marriage
- Adjective form of Urf (customary non-Shariah law in Muslim societies)
- Urfi Javed (born 1997), Indian television actress and internet personality

== See also ==
- Orfi (disambiguation)
- URF (disambiguation)
- Ofra (disambiguation)
