= Golden Sword =

Golden Sword or Golden sword may refer to:

- Golden Sword (horse), a racehorse active 2009-2010
- The Golden Sword (novel), a 1977 Janet Morris novel
- Gold Sword for Bravery, Russian decoration (1720-1917)
- The Golden Sword (album), a 1966 jazz album by the Gerald Wilson Orchestra
