= Heroes in Hell (book) =

1986 book by Janet Morris

- Author: Janet Morris, ed.
- Language: English
- Series: Heroes in Hell
- Genre: Bangsian fantasy Shared world Fantasy
- Publisher: Baen Books
- Publication date: March 1986
- Publication place: United States
- Media type: Print (paperback)
- ISBN: 978-0-671-65555-6
- Followed by: The Gates of Hell

Heroes in Hell is an anthology book and the first volume of its namesake series, created by American writer Janet Morris. The book placed eighth in the annual Locus Poll for Best Anthology in 1987. "Newton Sleep" by Gregory Benford, originally published in The Magazine of Fantasy and Science Fiction, received a Nebula Award nomination in 1986, as well as placing 16th in its category in the Locus Poll.

== Contents ==
In order of presentation, the anthology contains:

- "Son of the Morning" by Chris Morris
- "Newton Sleep" by Gregory Benford – originally published in The Magazine of Fantasy & Science Fiction in 1985; nominated Nebula Award Best Novella 1986
- "The Prince" by C. J. Cherryh – originally published in Far Frontiers Vol. 4
- "A Walk in the Park" by Nancy Asire
- "The Hand of Providence" by David Drake
- "Basileus" by C. J. Cherryh and Janet Morris - originally published as a "special bonus" in the 1985 Baen Books paperback edition of Rhialto the Marvellous
- "To Reign in Hell" by Janet Morris

== Reception ==
Reviewer Chuq von Rospach declared "The concept is silly," going on to say that "the plots are for the most part banal, and the characters are unsympathetic. The writing is simplistic and the continuity is questionable. In other words, they borrowed all of the worst parts of Thieves' World and forgot to include what makes it worthwhile." The Encyclopedia of Hell states "Author Janet Morris created a unique underworld saga in her 1984 book, Heroes in Hell, a witty novel that declares 'Nobody who is anybody went to heaven.'...[it] weaves myth, legend, fact, and fantasy into a fascinating tapestry of underworld lore."
