= Gilgamesh the King =

Novel by Robert Silverberg

- Cover of first edition (hardcover)
- Author: Robert Silverberg
- Cover artist: Loretta Trezzo
- Language: English
- Genre: Historical
- Publisher: Arbor House
- Publication date: 1984
- Publication place: United States
- Media type: Print (Hardcover & Paperback)
- Pages: 320 pp
- ISBN: 0-87795-599-9
- OCLC: 10849752
- Dewey Decimal: 813/.54 19
- LC Class: PS3569.I472 G5 1984

Gilgamesh the King is a 1984 historical novel by American writer Robert Silverberg, presenting the Epic of Gilgamesh as a novel. In the afterword the author wrote "at all times I have attempted to interpret the fanciful and fantastic events of these poems in a realistic way, that is, to tell the story of Gilgamesh as though he were writing his own memoirs, and to that end I have introduced many interpretations of my own devising which for better or for worse are in no way to be ascribed to the scholars".

== Plot introduction ==
The novel is told from the point of view of Gilgamesh, and is primarily ambivalent about the supernatural elements of the epic. But the events are portrayed in a fairly realistic manner. Gilgamesh is a giant among men and an amazing warrior, even since he was very young. When the king of Uruk (his father) dies, Gilgamesh is exiled by the recently crowned Dumuzi, jealous of his skills and power. When in time Dumuzi dies, Gilgamesh comes back to the kingdom to be proclaimed.

Silverberg afterwards wrote a number of stories for the fantasy anthology series Heroes in Hell describing Gilgamesh's posthumous adventures in the underworld, including the award-winning novella Gilgamesh in the Outback.

== Reception ==
Neil Gaiman reviewed Gilgamesh the King for Imagine magazine, describing the work as "A fascinating look at a long-gone culture, with a magnificent Jim Burns cover."

Dave Langford reviewed Gilgamesh the King for White Dwarf #69, and stated that "Silverberg's version is laudable, essential reading [...] but his realistic approach weakens (I think) the theme of immortality. Compare his amazing fantasy The Book of Skulls."

== Reviews ==
- Review by Faren Miller (1984) in Locus, #287 December 1984
- Review by Lynn F. Williams (1985) in Fantasy Review, January 1985
- Review by Baird Searles (1985) in Isaac Asimov's Science Fiction Magazine, February 1985
- Review by Doc Kennedy (1985) in Rod Serling's The Twilight Zone Magazine, July–August 1985
- Review by Thomas A. Easton [as by Tom Easton] (1985) in Analog Science Fiction/Science Fact, July 1985
- Review by Sue Thomason (1985) in Vector 127
- Review by Alma Jo Williams (1986) in Science Fiction Review, Winter 1986
- Review [German] by Detlef Hedderich (1988) in Das Science Fiction Jahr Ausgabe 1988
