= Dream Dancing =

Dream Dancing may refer to:

- "Dream Dancing" (Cole Porter song), 1941
- Dream Dancing (Eddie Higgins album), 1978
- Dream Dancing (Ella Fitzgerald album), 1978
- Dream Dancing (Jimmy Knepper album), 1986

== See also ==
- Dancing the Dream
- Dance of a Dream
- Dream Dancer
