= Threshold (Morris novel) =

1990 novel by Janet Morris

- Author: Janet Morris Chris Morris
- Language: English
- Genre: Science fiction
- Publisher: Roc
- Publication date: August 1990
- Media type: Print
- Pages: 209
- ISBN: 978-0-451-45022-7
- Followed by: Trust Territory

Threshold is a 1990 science fiction novel by American writers Chris Morris and Janet Morris. It is the first book of its namesake trilogy.

== Plot summary ==
In a futuristic world, Earth is now a preserve. A captain is transported 500 years into the future and onto Threshold, which is a space habitat. Here he meets with the daughter of a Muslim leader, one of many who are being kept from their travel to Mecca.
