= Wind from the Abyss =

1978 novel by Janet Morris

- Author: Janet Morris
- Language: English
- Series: Silistra
- Genre: Science fantasy
- Publisher: Bantam Books
- Publication date: 1978
- Publication place: United States
- Media type: Print (paperback)
- ISBN: 978-0-553-11250-4
- Preceded by: The Golden Sword
- Followed by: The Carnelian Throne

Wind from The Abyss is a science fantasy novel by American writer Janet Morris, published in 1978. It is the third book of her Silistra series.

== Setting ==
Khys Enmies, a priest of the heretic Laonan sect in pre-apocalyptic Silistra was fathered by a man from the planet of Mi'ysten where its inhabitants are taught to use their superior psychic powers from an early age. During the apocalyptic era named the 'hide days', the people of Silistra were divided into hides, settlements and related lineages formed on their underground shelters following the apocalypse and there was no common system or leadership binding them.

Khys installed himself as the head of the Stoth priesthood and united Silistra under a common system of beliefs and moral code. Later, he settled at the remote Lake of Horns and through a series of eugenics experiments, created through favourable women of Silistra a new race named the Lake-Born that inherited distinguished traits of Khys himself. Khys reformed the Stoth priesthood and based the advent theocratic caste of Day-Keepers on the Lake-Born.

Khys is now a mythical figure for Silistrans and his existence and his abode is known only to the highest members of the Day-Keepers caste. Nevertheless, he is still the only and absolute ruler of Silistra, controlling the entire planet through his network of Day-Keepers.

== Synopsis ==
Wind From the Abyss picks up approximately two years after the battle for Well Astria during which two Bipedal Federation ships and crew were destroyed accidentally. Khys, the “dharen” or ruler of Silistra for thousands of years, has captured Estri, Sereth and Chayin, taking them to his exclusive city/keep at the Lake of Horns. Before being captured by Khys, Estri, Sereth, a former Slayer turned renegade, and Chayin, Cahndor of a Parset desert tribe, form a triad of sexuality and power as foretold in an ancient prophecy that threatens Khys’ rule of the planet.

Immediately after the Well Astria battle, Estri, Chayin and Sereth are captured by Khys, tyrant ruler of Silistra (“the dharen”) and held hostage for over 2 years. He knows these three are key in maintaining control of the planet. He has Estri's memories blocked so she will not attempt to wrest control from him; Estri's journey to understand her “Shaper” heritage is interrupted.

Estri regains her memory after Khys’ council fails to get information locked in her mind by her father. Khys and Estri are taken to a planet to meet Estrazi (Estri's father) and Khystrai (Khys’ father) who tell Khys he must start over with this uninhabited planet because he has failed to govern Silistra well enough for the last 25,000 years.

Estri is returned to Silistra alone and materializes in the midst of a battle between the Parset desert tribes and the privileged “Lakeborn” who live in the city of the dharen.

She is reunited with Chayin and Sereth and they renew their bond to each other, although Estri fears she will hold them back with the “slave” mentality Khys forced on her. Khys returns by himself, insistent on dueling with Sereth, but is in such a depleted condition that Sereth kills him fairly easily, making Sereth the ruler of Silistra. Sereth leaves Carth, an associate of Khys and Estri's teacher/brainwasher, to run the city but arrange it so the city cannot be rebuilt and returned to its former glory. They decide to move many of the “Lakeborn” to other parts of the planet to intermix blood lines and strengthen the Silistran gene pool.

Estri, Chayin and Sereth finally admit to themselves they are the people spoken of in an ancient prophecy and they must play out the rest of their fate. They take ship to explore a continent Khys had kept off-limits for generations.

Estri's journey of self-awareness and the trio's fulfillment of the “Seker’oth prophecy” (which means “Golden Sword”) conclude in The Carnelian Throne, the final book in the Silistra series.
