= The Dion Brothers =

1974 film by Jack Starrett

The Gravy Train
- Directed by: Jack Starrett
- Written by: Bill Kerby; Terrence Malick (as David Whitney)
- Produced by: Jonathan Taplin
- Starring: Stacy Keach; Frederic Forrest
- Cinematography: Enrique Bravo; Gerald Hirschfeld
- Edited by: John C. Horger
- Music by: Fred Karlin
- Distributed by: Columbia Pictures
- Release date: June 16, 1974
- Running time: 94 minutes
- Country: United States
- Language: English

The Dion Brothers, also commonly known as The Gravy Train, is a 1974 American crime-comedy film directed by Jack Starrett, written by Terrence Malick (under the pseudonym David Whitney) and Bill Kerby, and starring Stacy Keach and Frederic Forrest.

Although initially overlooked by audiences and critics alike, it has in recent years developed a cult following, and has been highly praised by filmmakers such as Quentin Tarantino and David Gordon Green. The film is still relatively obscure and hard to find, as there has never been any official VHS or DVD release.

== Plot ==
Two West Virginia brothers quit their jobs as coal miners in order to make their fortune from armed robbery.

== Cast ==
- Stacy Keach as Calvin
- Frederic Forrest as Rut
- Margot Kidder as Margue
- Barry Primus as Tony
- Richard Romanus as Carlo
- Denny Miller as Rex
- Robert Phillips as Gino

== Legacy ==
Despite a limited theatrical run and no subsequent VHS or DVD releases, The Gravy Train has still become somewhat of a cult film. David Gordon Green has cited it as one of his five favorite films of all time, as a major influence on his film Pineapple Express (2008), and as "the funniest movie ever made". Green also screened the film in a film series he curated at the Brooklyn Academy of Music.

Quentin Tarantino screened the film at his 2nd QT-Fest in 1998, and again in 2006 at his Best of QT-Fest.
