= Gilgamesh in the Outback =

Science fiction novella by Robert Silverberg

- Author: Robert Silverberg
- Cover artist: Gary Freeman
- Language: English
- Genre: Science fiction
- Publisher: Asimov's Science Fiction
- Publication date: 1986
- Publication place: United States

Gilgamesh in the Outback is a science fiction novella by American writer Robert Silverberg, a sequel to his historical novel Gilgamesh the King as well as a story in the shared universe series Heroes in Hell. It won the Hugo Award for Best Novella in 1987 and was also nominated for the Nebula Award for Best Novella in 1986. Originally published in Asimov's Science Fiction, it was then printed in Rebels in Hell before being incorporated into Silverberg's novel To the Land of the Living. Real-life writers Robert E. Howard and H. P. Lovecraft feature as characters in the novella.

Robert Silverberg wrote that he was "drawn into" writing a story for the "Heroes in Hell" project. While he remembered that the central concept of the series was "never clearly explained" to him, he noted the similarity of "Heroes in Hell" to Philip José Farmer's Riverworld works, and decided "to run my own variant on what Farmer had done a couple of decades earlier." After writing "Gilgamesh in the Outback", he decided that, since the story "was all so much fun," to write two sequels, "The Fascination of the Abomination" and "Gilgamesh in Uruk". In writing those stories, as Silverberg recalled, he "never read many of the other 'Heroes in Hell' stories", and had "no idea" of how consistent his work was with that of his "putative collaborators"; instead, he had "gone his own way ... with only the most tangential links to what others had invented."

Silverberg compiled the three stories as To the Land of the Living, revising the stories to remove any references to other writers' contributions to "Heroes in Hell" to avoid copyright issues. To the Land of the Living was published in the British market in 1989 and reprinted in an American edition in 1990.
