= The Stalk =

1994 novel by Janet Morris

- Author: Janet Morris and Chris Morris
- Language: English
- Series: Threshold
- Genre: Science fiction
- Publisher: Roc
- Publication date: January 1, 1994
- Media type: Print
- Pages: 256
- ISBN: 978-0-451-45307-5
- Preceded by: Trust Territory

The Stalk is a science fiction novel by American writers Chris Morris and Janet Morris, published in 1994. It is the third book of their Threshold trilogy.
