= Medjidi Tabia fortress =

Fortress on the Danube, Bulgaria

Medjidi Tabia
- Меджиди табия
- Silistra, Bulgaria
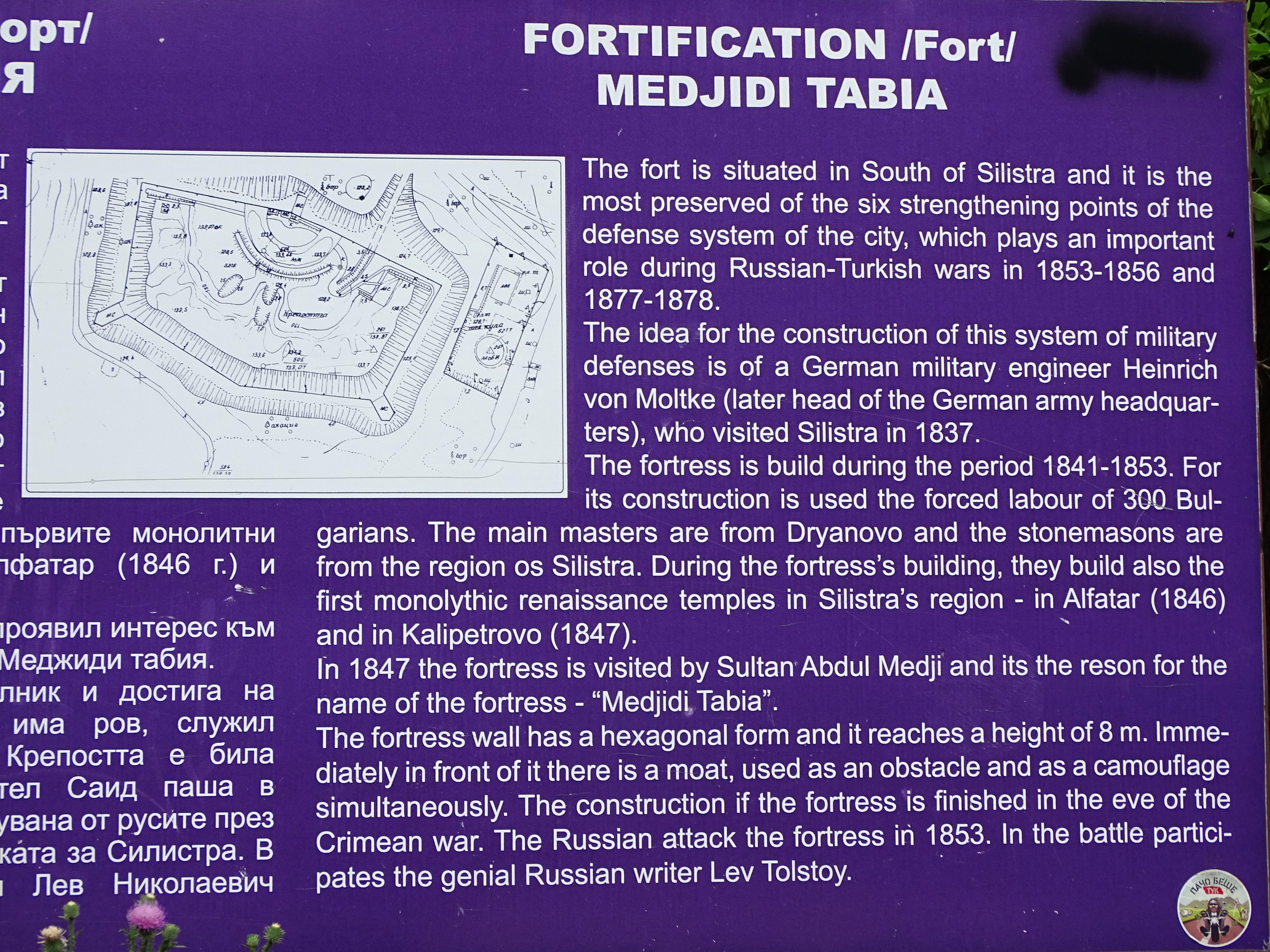
- The information board of the fortress in English

Site information
- Condition: reconstructed

Location
- Coordinates: 44°06′08″N 27°15′24″E

The Medjidi Tabia Fortress (Bulgarian: Меджиди табия) is a fortress from the 1840s and early 1850s.

The fortress was built in the period 1841-1853 according to the plans of the German military engineer Helmut von Moltke who visited Silistra in 1837. In 1847 it was visited by Sultan Abdulmejid I, whose name is called — Majidi Tabia.

In 1854, during the Crimean War, the fortress withstood a month-long Russian siege — Siege of Silistria.

The fortress now serves as a museum.

== Gallery ==
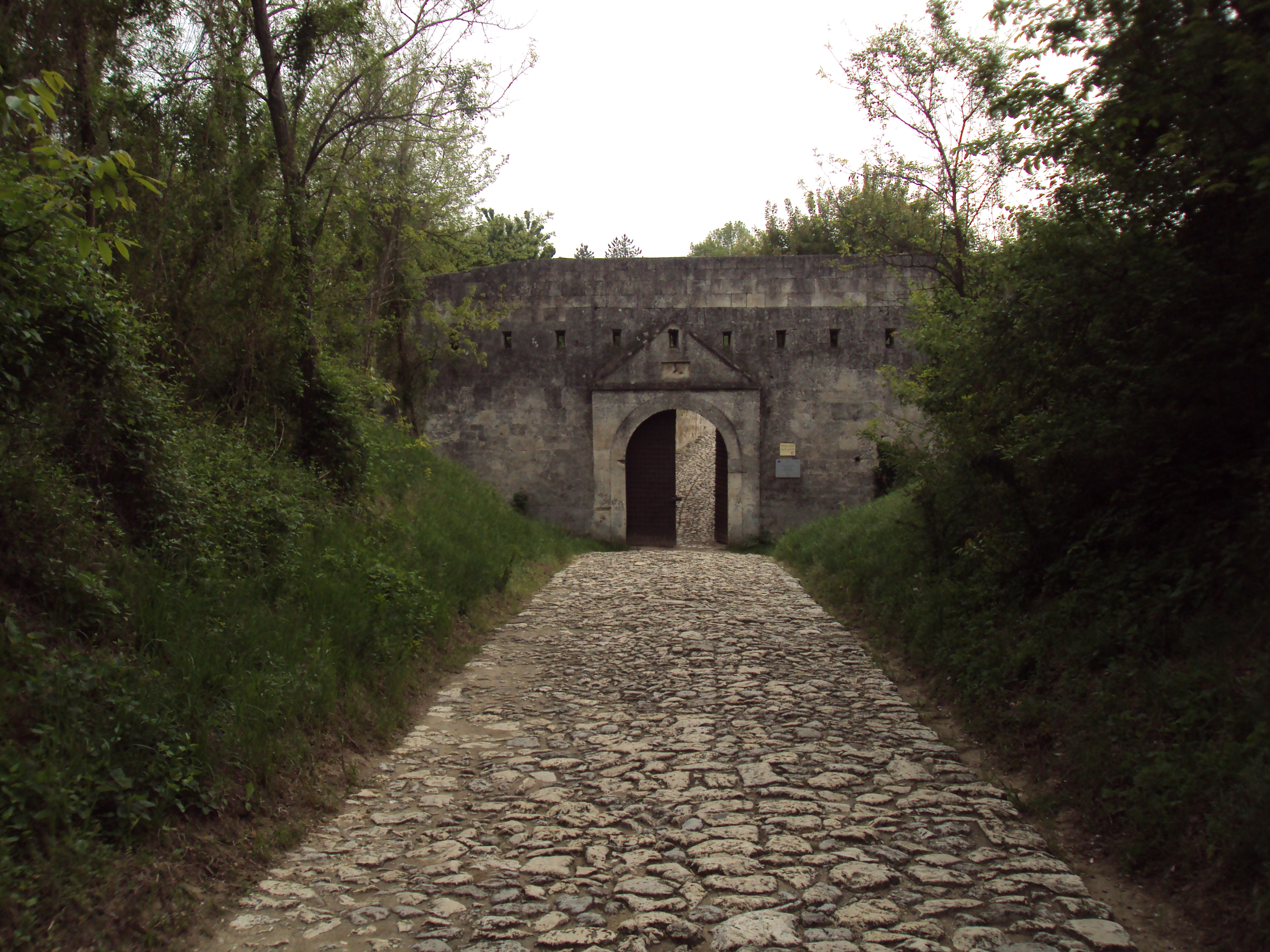

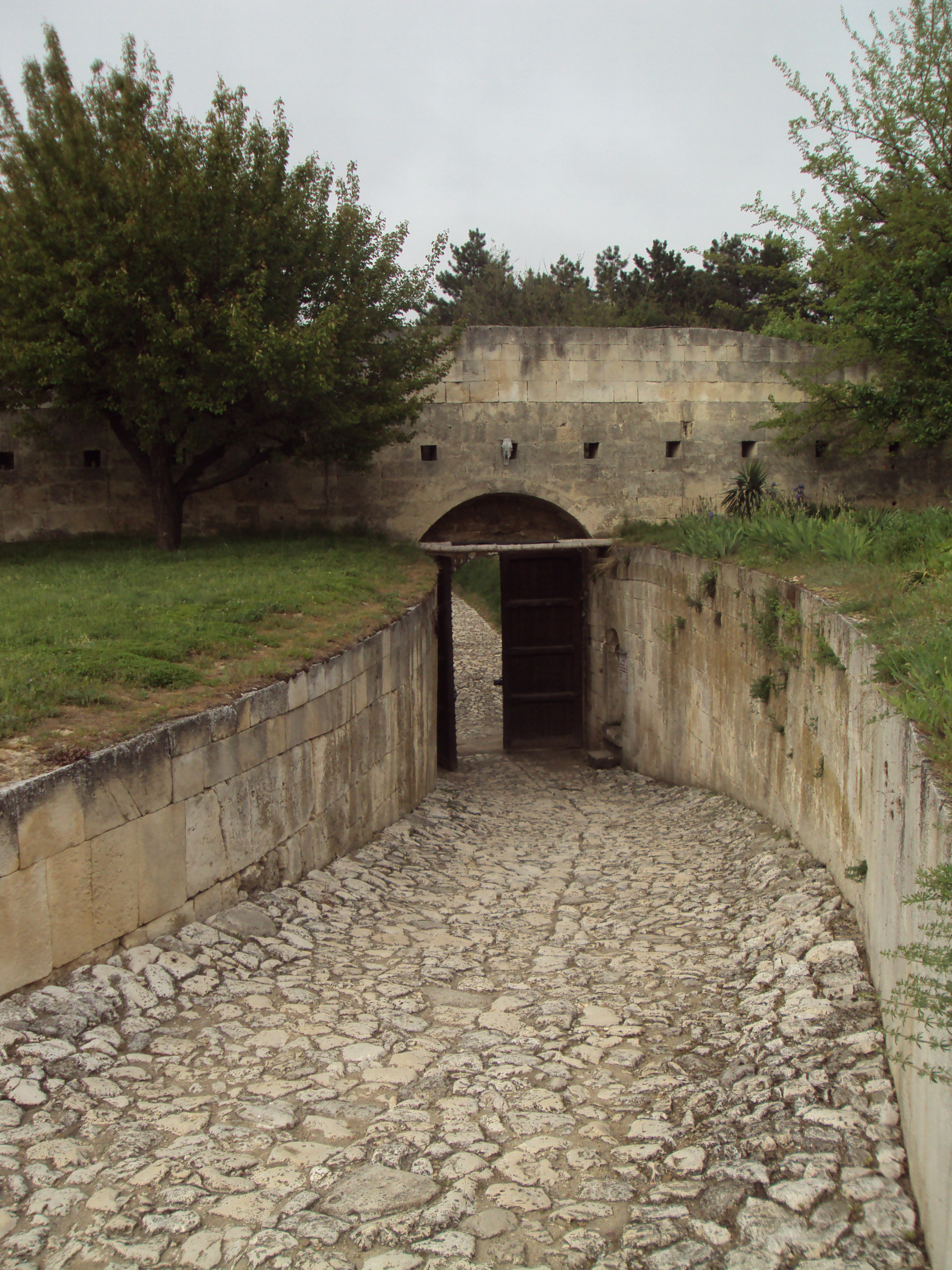

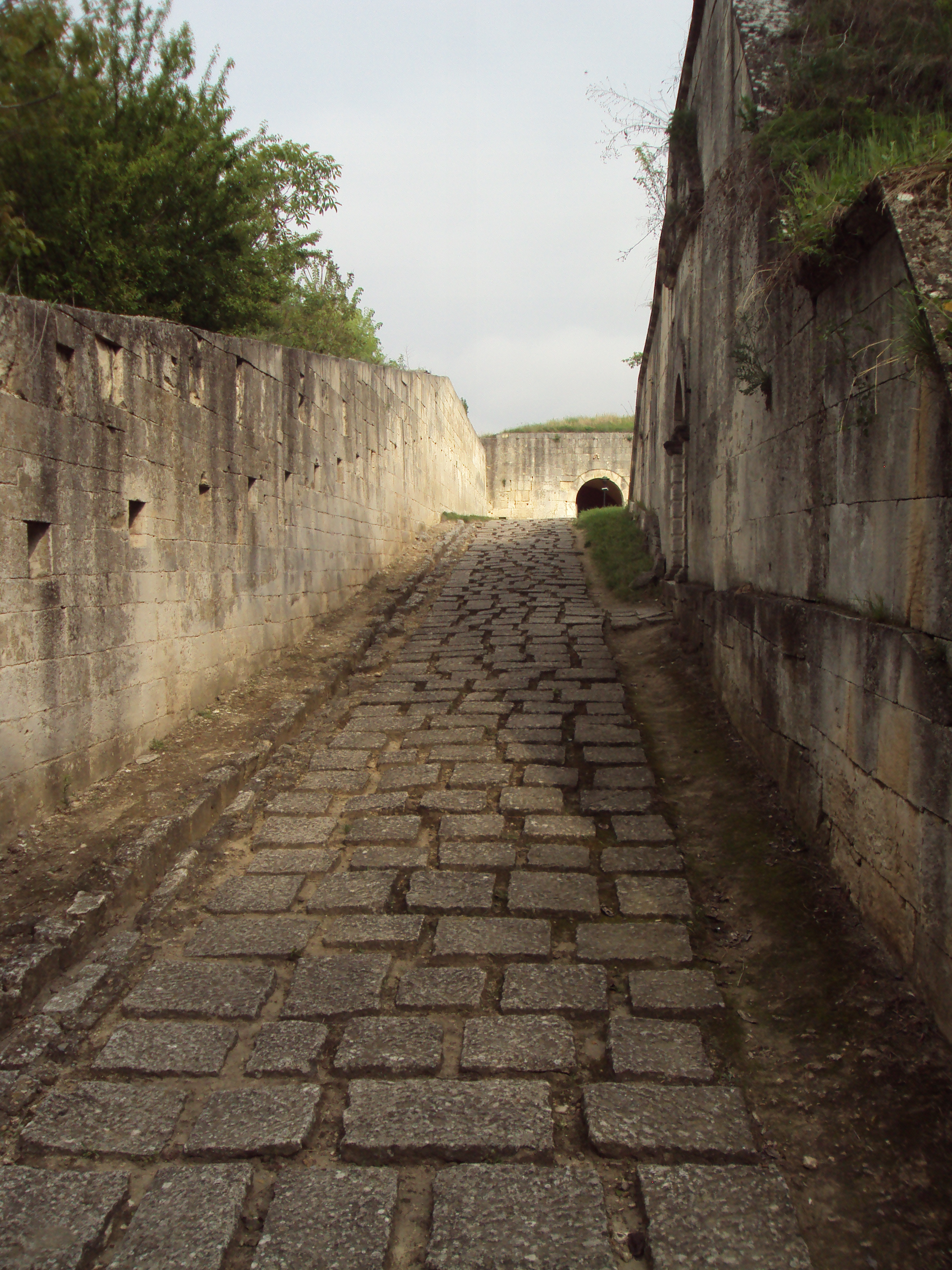

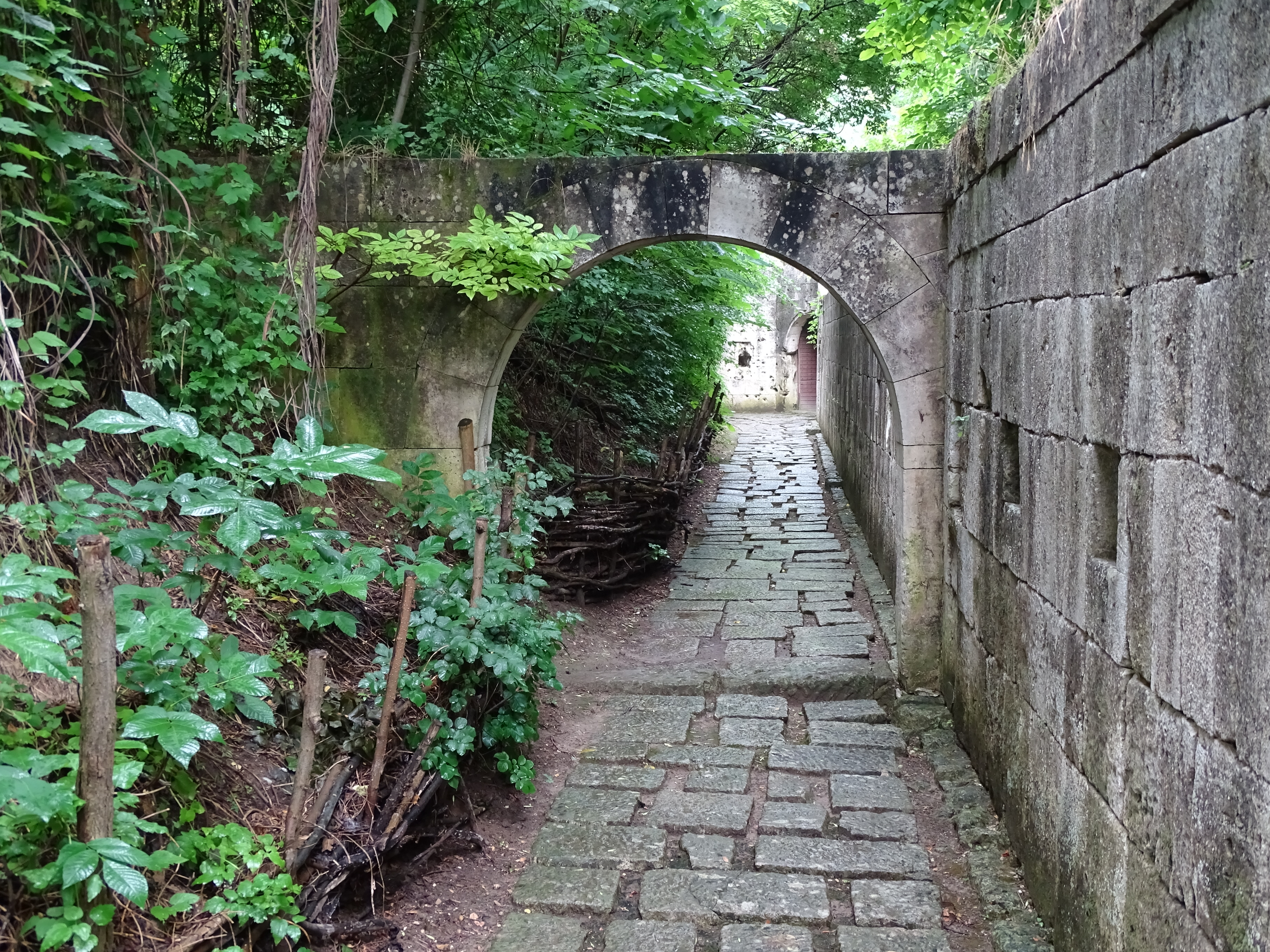
