= Angel with the Sword =

1985 novel by C. J. Cherryh

- First edition cover
- Author: C. J. Cherryh
- Cover artist: Tim Hildebrandt
- Language: English
- Genre: Science fiction
- Publisher: DAW Books
- Publication date: September 1985
- Publication place: United States
- Pages: 301 (hardback)
- ISBN: 0-8099-0001-7

Angel with the Sword is a science fiction novel by American writer C. J. Cherryh, published in 1985 by DAW Books. It is set in Cherryh's Alliance–Union universe, and is the first book in the shared universe Merovingen Nights.

== Reception ==
Dave Langford reviewed Angel with the Sword for White Dwarf #91, and stated that "it zips smartly along to an inconclusive ending on p. 250: the last fifty pages are superfluous appendices, maps, etc., indicating not merely a sequel but considerable cheek".

== Reviews ==
- Review by Faren Miller (1985) in Locus #295, August 1985
- Review by Robin Roberts (1986) in Fantasy Review, February 1986
- Review by Tom Easton (1986) in Analog Science Fiction/Science Fact, May 1986
- Review by Don D'Ammassa (1986) in Science Fiction Chronicle #83, August 1986
- Review by John C. Bunnell (1987) in Dragon Magazine, March 1987
- Review [French] by Charles Moreau (1987) in Fiction #387
- Review by Ron Gemmell (1987) in Paperback Inferno #67
