= Heroes in Hell =

American Bangsian fantasy series

- Heroes in Hell, the first book in the series
- Heroes in Hell; The Gates of Hell; Rebels in Hell; Kings in Hell; Crusaders in Hell; Legions of Hell; Angels in Hell; Masters in Hell; The Little Helliad; War in Hell; Prophets in Hell; Explorers in Hell; Lawyers in Hell; Rogues in Hell; Bridge Over Hell; Dreamers in Hell; Poets in Hell; Doctors in Hell; Hell Bound; Pirates in Hell; Hell Hounds; Lovers in Hell; Hell Gate; Mystics in Hell; Liars in Hell; Monsters in Hell
- Author: Janet Morris, series editor
- Cover artist: David B. Mattingly (first book in series)
- Country: United States
- Genre: Novels and short stories shared world fantasy Bangsian fantasy
- Publisher: Baen Books, Kerlak Enterprises/Perseid Publishing, Perseid Press
- Published: 1986–1989, 2011–2022

Heroes in Hell is a series of shared world fantasy books, within the genre Bangsian fantasy, created and edited by Janet Morris and written by her, Chris Morris, C. J. Cherryh and others. The first 12 books in the series were published by Baen Books between 1986 and 1989, and stories from the series include one Hugo Award winner and Nebula nominee ("Gilgamesh in the Outback" by Robert Silverberg from Rebels in Hell), as well as one other Nebula Award nominee. The series was resurrected in 2011 by Janet Morris with the thirteenth book and eighth anthology in the series, Lawyers in Hell, followed by eight more anthologies and four novels between 2012 and 2022.

== Background ==
The shared world premise of Heroes in Hell (also called The Damned Saga) is that all the dead wind up together in Hell, where they pick up where they left off when still alive. Robert W. Cape Jr., in Classical Traditions in Science Fiction (Oxford University Press), wrote "...in the popular Heroes in Hell series, Julius Caesar intrigues in the underworld with Alexander the Great, Machiavelli, and other historical rulers. Death has not changed their natures, and their political and military machinations seem similar to those of rulers at the end of the Cold War." The Encyclopedia of Fantasy states "In the long series of shared world adventures begun with Heroes in Hell, Hell becomes an arena in which all the interesting people in history can come together to continue the relentless pursuit of their various ends." Brian Stableford commented that the series "adapted the backcloth of Dantean fantasy as a stage for violent adventures with ironic echoes of infernal comedy".

== Reception ==
Science fiction and fantasy author Orson Scott Card compared the success of Heroes in Hell with other shared worlds like Thieves' World, Wild Cards and Liavek, and said that this "almost guarantees that shared worlds will be around for many years to come". The webzine SF Site discussed the popularity of shared worlds in the 1980s and listed Heroes in Hell as a "significant example" of one of them. Library Journal called Heroes in Hell "a garden of infernal delights."

Miriam Van Scott reviews the first novel in the series within her book Encyclopedia of Hell.

Author Janet Morris created a unique underworld saga in her 1984 book, Heroes in Hell, a witty novel that declares "Nobody who is anybody went to heaven." The collection of infernal vignettes features everyone from the legendary hero GILGAMESH to actor James Dean in the great below, with the likes of Caesar and Mao Zedong thrown in for color. Trapped in the abyss of fire, the villains continue vying for power and position in the underworld to the delight of SATAN, their new overseer. Heroes was published with a companion novel, Gates of Hell.

She later describes the entire series within the same book.

Innovative and clever, the Damned Saga weaves myth, legend, fact, and fantasy into a fascinating tapestry of underworld lore. The Heroes series also testifies to the immense popularity hell enjoys even in this modern age of literature.

== Books in the series ==
There are nine novels in the series and sixteen anthologies of short fiction. Janet Morris edited all sixteen anthologies. Portions of Legions of Hell first appeared in stories published in Heroes in Hell, The Gates of Hell, Rebels in Hell, Kings in Hell and Crusaders in Hell.

- Heroes in Hell (1986), anthology (published by Baen Books, ISBN 978-0-671-65555-6) (1987 Locus Poll Best Anthology (8th Place))
  - "Son of the Morning", Chris Morris
  - "Newton Sleep", Gregory Benford – originally published in The Magazine of Fantasy & Science Fiction in 1985; nominated Nebula Award Best Novella 1986. The main character Gregory Markham first appeared in the novel Timescape.
  - "The Prince", C. J. Cherryh
  - "A Walk in the Park", Nancy Asire
  - "The Hand of Providence", David Drake
  - "Basileus", C. J. Cherryh & Janet Morris
  - "To Reign in Hell", Janet Morris
- The Gates of Hell (1986), novel by C. J. Cherryh and Janet Morris (published by Baen Books, ISBN 978-0-671-65592-1)
- Rebels in Hell (1986), anthology (published by Baen Books, ISBN 978-0-671-65577-8)
  - "Undercover Angel", Chris Morris
  - "Hell's Gate", Bill Kerby
  - "Gilgamesh in the Outback", Robert Silverberg (originally published in Isaac Asimov's Science Fiction Magazine, won the Hugo Award for Best Novella in 1987, was nominated 1986 Nebula Award for Best Novella.)
  - "Marking Time", C. J. Cherryh
  - "Table with a View", Nancy Asire
  - "There Are No Fighter Pilots Down In Hell", Martin Caidin
  - "'Cause I Served My Time In Hell", David Drake
  - "Monday Morning", C. J. Cherryh
  - "Graveyard Shift", Janet Morris
- Kings in Hell (1987), novel by C. J. Cherryh and Janet Morris, (published by Baen Books, ISBN 978-0-671-65614-0)
- Crusaders in Hell (1987), anthology (published by Baen Books, ISBN 978-0-671-65639-3)
  - "The Nature of Hell", Janet Morris and Chris Morris
  - "Gilgamesh Redux", Janet Morris
  - "Crusaders in Love", Bill Kerby
  - "Between the Devil and The Deep Blue Sea", Michael Armstrong
  - "Sharper Than a Serpent's Tooth", C. J. Cherryh
  - "By Invitation Only", Nancy Asire
  - "The Gods of the Gaps", Gregory Benford
  - "Springs Eternal", David Drake
  - "Snowballs in Hell", Chris Morris
- Legions of Hell (1987), novel by C. J. Cherryh (published by Baen Books, ISBN 978-0-671-65653-9)
- Angels in Hell (1987), anthology edited by Janet Morris (published by Baen Books, ISBN 978-0-671-65360-6)
  - "Handmaids in Hell" by Chris Morris
  - "The Fascination of the Abomination" by Robert Silverberg
  - "The Price of an Egg" by Alexandra Sokolov
  - "Reaching for Paradise" by Brad Miner
  - "The Ex-Khan" by Robert L. Asprin
  - "The Conscience of the King" by C. J. Cherryh and Nancy Asire
  - "Learning Curve" by David Drake
  - "Sea of Stiffs" by Janet Morris
- Masters in Hell (1987), anthology (published by Baen Books, ISBN 978-0-671-65379-8)
  - "The Ransom of Hellcat" by Chris Morris
  - "Take Two" by Bill Kerby
  - "Hellbike" by George Foy
  - "Houseguests" by Nancy Asire
  - "Spitting in the Wind" by Lynn Abbey
  - "God's Eyes" by Michael Armstrong
  - "Bargain" by David Drake
  - "Pawn in Play" by C. J. Cherryh
  - "Sea Change" by Janet Morris
- The Little Helliad (1988), novel by Janet Morris and Chris Morris (published by Baen Books, ISBN 978-0-671-65366-8)
- War in Hell (1988), anthology (published by Baen Books, ISBN 978-0-671-69792-1)
  - "[...] Is Hell" by Janet Morris
  - "Wisdom" by David Drake
  - "Fallout" by Nancy Asire
  - "Gilgamesh in Uruk" by Robert Silverberg
  - "An Appropriate Hell" by Diana L. Paxson
  - "The Man in the Black Cape Turn" by Michael Armstrong
  - "Giving Hell a Shot" by Bill Kerby
  - "Rook's Move" by C. J. Cherryh
  - "Sign On" by Chris Morris
- Prophets in Hell (1989), anthology (published by Baen Books, ISBN 978-0-671-69822-5)
  - "Eye of a Needle" by Chris Morris
  - "Exile" by David Drake
  - "The Garden of Blood Narcissus" by Brad Miner
  - "Death Freaks" by Robert Sheckley
  - "Profits in Hell" by Bill Kerby
  - "Terminal" by George Alec Effinger
  - "I, Hermes Trismegistus" by Richard Groller
  - "Fast Food" by Nancy Asire
  - "The Sibylline Affair" by C. J. Cherryh
  - "Moving Day" by Janet Morris
- Explorers in Hell (1989), novel by David Drake and Janet Morris (published by Baen Books, ISBN 978-0-671-69813-3)
- Lawyers in Hell (2011), anthology (published by Perseid Publishing/Kerlak Enterprises, Inc., ISBN 978-1-937035-02-0, ISBN 978-1-937035-01-3, & ISBN 978-1-937035860)
  - "Interview with the Devil" by Janet Morris and Chris Morris
  - "Tribe of Hell" by Janet Morris
  - "The Rapture Elevator" by Michael Armstrong
  - "Out of Court Settlement" by C. J. Cherryh
  - "Revolutionary Justice" by Leo Champion
  - "Tale of a Tail" by Nancy Asire
  - "And Injustice For All" by Jason Cordova
  - "Measure of a Man" by Deborah Koren
  - "The Adjudication of Hetty Green" by Allan Gilbreath – First Runner Up Darrell Award for Best Midsouth Science Fiction/Fantasy/Horror Short Story 2012
  - "Plains of Hell" by Bruce Durham
  - "The Register" by Michael H. Hanson
  - "Island Out of Time" by Richard Groller
  - "Appellate Angel" by Edward McKeown
  - "With Enemies Like These" by David L. Burkhead
  - "The Dark Arts" by Kimberly Richardson
  - "Heads You Lose" by Michael Z. Williamson
  - "Check and Mate" by Bradley H. Sinor
  - "Disclaimer" by John Manning
  - "Orientation Day" by Sarah Hulcy
  - "Remember, Remember, Hell in November" by Larry Atchley, Jr.
  - "Theos Khthonios" by Scott Oden
  - "Erra and the Seven" by Chris Morris
- Rogues in Hell (2012), anthology (published by Perseid Publishing, ISBN 978-0-9851668-7-8)
  - "Babe in Hell" by Janet Morris and Chris Morris
  - "Which Way I Fly is Hell" by Janet Morris
  - "Downtown Run" by Nancy Asire
  - "Madly Meeting Logically" by Michael Armstrong
  - "Library Redux" by Sarah Hulcy
  - "A Hatful of Dynamite" by Deborah Koren
  - "Colony" by Bruce Durham
  - "Searcher" by Edward McKeown
  - "The Miraculous Roadside Attraction" by Jack William Finley
  - "BDA" by Richard Groller
  - "Hell Road Truckers" by Michael H. Hanson
  - "If Necessary" by Bradley H. Sinor
  - "Pursued by the Tauwu" by Shirley Meier
  - "Ragnarok & Roll" by Larry Atchley, Jr.
  - "Scent of a Weapon" by Bill Snider
  - "Showdown at Brimstone Arsenal" by John Manning
  - "The Place of Fear" by David L. Burkhead
  - "Chasing the Key" by H. David Blalock
  - "A Hard Day at the Office" by Michael Z. Williamson
  - "An Unholy Grail" by Julie Cochrane
  - "Battle of Tartaros" by Chris Morris
- Bridge Over Hell (2012), novel by Michael A. Armstrong (published by Perseid Publishing, ISBN 978-0985935153, ISBN 0985935154)
- Dreamers in Hell (2013), anthology (published by Perseid Press, ISBN 978-0-9892100-2-7)
  - "Barefoot, on Brimstone" by Sara M. Harvey
  - "In the Shadow of Paradise" by Jason Cordova
  - "Siegfreid's Blade" by Petra Jorns
  - "More Light! Goeth" by Bettina Meister
  - "Alms for Oblivion" by Janet Morris
  - "Fools in Hell" by Janet Morris and Chris Morris
  - "Hell Bent" by Janet Morris
  - "The Unholy Hole" by Nancy Asire
  - "Ophie and the Undertaker" by Shebat Legion
  - "Hell I Must Be Going" by Michael A. Ventrella
  - "Blood and Ash" by Tom Barczak
  - "Just Dessert" by John Manning
  - "The Wager" by Deborah Koren
  - "The ITTT" by Michael H. Hanson
  - "Zero Sum Game" by Richard Groller
  - "Essence Helliance" by Yelle Hughes
  - "And the Truth Will Set You Free" by Jack William Finley
  - "Stairway to Heaven" by Ed McKeown
  - "Head Games" by Bill Snider
  - "Knocking on Heaven's Gates" by Larry Atchley, Jr.
  - "The Knife Edge Bridge" by David L. Burkhead
  - "Hellexandria the Great" by Sarah Snyder Gray Hulcy
- Poets in Hell (2014), anthology (published by Perseid Press, ISBN 978-0-9914654-3-9)
  - "Words" by Chris Morris
  - "Seven Against Hell" by Janet Morris and Chris Morris
  - "Reunion" by Nancy Asire
  - "Hell-hounds" by Bruce Durham
  - "The Kid with No Name" by Jack William Finley
  - "All Hell to Pay" by Deborah Koren
  - "Poetic Injustice" by Larry Atchley, Jr.
  - "When You Gaze Into an Abyss" by Matthew Kirshenblatt
  - "Pride and Penance" by Tom Barczak
  - "Grand Slam" by pdmac
  - "Undertaker's Holiday" by Joe Bonadonna and Shebat Legion
  - "Red Tail's Corner" by Yelle Hughes
  - "Faust III" by Richard Groller
  - "Tapestry of Sorrows and Sighs" by Bill Snider
  - "Haiku d'Etat" by Beth W. Patterson
  - "A Mother's Heart" by Bill Barnhill
  - "We the Furious" by Joe Bonadonna
  - "Damned Poets Society" by Michael H. Hanson
  - "All We Need of Hell" by Michael A. Armstrong
  - "Dress Rehearsal" by Janet Morris
- Doctors in Hell (2015), anthology (published by Perseid Press, ASIN B00Z753EX8)
  - "The Wager" by Janet Morris and Chris Morris
  - "The Cure" by Chris Morris
  - "Grim" by Andrew P. Weston
  - "The Right Man for the Job" by Deborah Koren
  - "Memory" by Nancy Asire
  - "What Price Oblivion" by R. E. Hinkle
  - "In the Shadowlands" by Richard Groller
  - "Let Us Kill the Spirit of Gravity" by Matthew Kirshenblatt
  - "Pavlovian Slip" by Bill Snider
  - "Hell on a Technicality" by Joe Bonadonna
  - "Convalescence" by Michael H. Hanson
  - "Hell Noon" by Paul Freeman
  - "The Judas Book" by Jack William Finley
  - "Writer's Block" by Janet Morris and Chris Morris
- Hell Bound (2015), novel by Andrew P. Weston (published by Perseid Press, ISBN 0996428941, ISBN 978-0996428941)
- Pirates in Hell (2017), anthology (published by Perseid Press, ISBN 978-0-9977584-5-0)
  - "Bitter Business" by Janet Morris and Chris Morris
  - "Pieces of Hate" by Andrew P. Weston
  - "Evil Angel" by Janet Morris and Chris Morris
  - "Who's A Pirate Now?" by Nancy Asire
  - "Curse of the Pharaohs" by S.E. Lindberg
  - "Lir's Children" by Paul Freeman
  - "Unholiest Grail" by Larry Atchley, Jr.
  - "The Bitter Taste of Hell's Injustice" by Jack William Finley
  - "Serial Recall and Beautiful Tortures" by Michael H. Hanson
  - "Drink and the Devil" by Rob Hinkle
  - "The Pirates of Penance" by Joe Bonadonna
  - "Muse of Fire" by Janet Morris and Chris Morris
  - "Hell Hounds (excerpt)" by Andrew P. Weston
- Hell Hounds (2017), novel by Andrew P. Weston (published by Perseid Press, ISBN 099826878X, ISBN 978-0998268781)
- Lovers in Hell (2018), anthology (published by Perseid Press, ISBN 978-1-948602-22-8)
  - "Love in the Afterlife, Parts 1, 2, and 3 (Never Doubt I Love; Fume of Sighs; Wrath of Love)" by Janet Morris and Chris Morris
  - "Love Interrupted" by Nancy Asire
  - "Lovers Sans Phalli" by S.E. Lindberg
  - "Calamity" by Michael E. Dellert
  - "Love Triangle" by Michael H. Hanson
  - "A Hand of Four Queens" by A. L. Butcher
  - "Devil's Trull" by Andrew P. Weston
  - "Withering Blights" by Joe Bonadonna
  - "Hell Gate (excerpt)" by Andrew P. Weston
- Hell Gate (2019), novel by Andrew P. Weston (published by Perseid Press, ISBN 1948602253, ISBN 978-1948602259)
- Mystics in Hell (2021), anthology (published by Perseid Press, ISBN 978-1-948602-31-0, ISBN 978-1-948602-30-3)
  - "A Frame of Mind" by Janet Morris and Chris Morris
  - "The Come Right Inn" by Andrew P. Weston
  - "Abode of Woe" by A. L. Butcher
  - "Fool's Gold" by S.E. Lindberg
  - "The True Believer" by Lou Antonelli
  - "By Any Means Necessary" by Gustavo Bondoni
  - "Excalibur" by Tom Barczak
  - "On the Run" by Michael H. Hanson
  - "The Sorcerous Apprentice" by Andrew P. Weston
  - "Colossus of Hell" by Joe Bonadonna
  - "Strange Arts" by Janet Morris and Chris Morris
- Liars in Hell (2022), anthology (published by Perseid Press, ISBN 978-1-948602-45-7, ISBN 978-1-948602-46-4, ISBN 978-1-948602-44-0 )
  - "The Seven Degrees of Lying" by Janet Morris and Chris Morris
  - "The Liar, the Witch and the Ward Robes" by Andrew P. Weston
  - "Bait and Switch" by S.E. Lindberg
  - "Fibbers in Hell" by Michael H. Hanson
  - "The Münchhausen Trilemma" by Richard Groller
  - "Hell's Bells" by Joe Bonadonna
  - "School of Night" by Janet Morris and Chris Morris
- Monsters in Hell (2024), anthology (published by Perseid Press, ISBN 978-1-948602-60-0, ISBN 978-1-948602-59-4, ASIN B0CYCJNTDB )
  - "The Green-eyed Monster" by Janet Morris & Chris Morris
  - "The Pied Piper of Harmelin" by A.L. Butcher
  - "Dogs of War" by S.E. Lindberg
  - "The Tarnished Horde" by Joe Bonadonna & S.E. Lindberg
  - "From Hell to Eternity" by Joe Bonadonna
  - "Fire in the Blood" by Chris Morris & Janet Morris

== See also ==
- Riverworld by Philip José Farmer – another depiction of the afterlife of historical characters
- The 35th of May, or Conrad's Ride to the South Seas by Erich Kästner – an earlier such depiction

== Sources ==
- Stableford, Brian (2005). Historical Dictionary of Fantasy Literature. Scarecrow Press. p. 356. ISBN 0-8108-4944-5.
- Card, Orson Scott (1990). How to write science fiction & fantasy. Writer's Digest Books. pp. 125–126. ISBN 978-1-58297-103-2.
- Clute, John; Grant, John (1997). The Encyclopedia of Fantasy. St. Martin's Press. p. 461. ISBN 0-312-19869-8.
- Van Scott, Miriam (1998). Encyclopedia of Hell. St. Martin's Press. p. 162. ISBN 0-312-18574-X.
