= The Carnelian Throne =

1979 novel by Janet Morris

- Author: Janet Morris
- Language: English
- Series: Silistra
- Genre: Science fantasy
- Publisher: Bantam Books
- Publication date: 1979
- Publication place: United States
- Media type: Print (paperback)
- ISBN: 978-0-553-11907-7
- Preceded by: Wind from the Abyss

The Carnelian Throne is a science fantasy novel by American writer Janet Morris. Published by Bantam Books in 1979, it is the fourth and final title of the Silistra series.
