= Merovingen Nights =

Shared universe science fiction edited by C. J. Cherryh

- Angel with the Sword cover
- Angel with the Sword; Festival Moon; Fever Season; Troubled Waters; Smuggler's Gold; Divine Right; Flood Tide; Endgame
- Author: C. J. Cherryh; Lynn Abbey; Nancy Asire; Robert Lynn Asprin; Leslie Fish; Mercedes Lackey; Chris Morris; Janet Morris; Roberta Rogow; Bradley H. Sinor
- Illustrator: Tim Hildebrandt (original cover artwork)
- Country: United States
- Genre: Shared world science fantasy
- Publisher: DAW Books
- Published: 1985–1991
- Media type: Print (hardcover and paperback)

Merovingen Nights is a series of shared universe science fiction books set in writer C. J. Cherryh's Alliance–Union universe. There are eight books in the series: a novel by Cherryh, Angel with the Sword, and seven short fiction anthologies which Cherryh edited. The books were published by DAW Books between 1985 and 1991.

Angel with the Sword was originally published by Cherryh in 1985 as a free-standing novel. The Merovingen Nights series came into being two years later when Cherryh began editing seven anthologies that were set in the same universe as Angel with the Sword. Angel with the Sword was subsequently republished with the Merovingen Nights branding.

The books take place on the planet Merovin in the Alliance-Union universe after AD 3240, and as such, they are definitively science fiction, but the level of technology on the planet is quite backwards for the 33rd century. For example, most personal weaponry is of the knife or sword variety; relatively few firearms are available and in any case nothing more advanced than a revolver. In addition, the planet Merovin is isolated, forsaken by the rest of humanity because of poor interstellar relations with an aggressive alien species, the Sharrh.

Because of these limitations on technology, trade, and travel, and because many of the stories feature swordplay and skullduggery, the series is reminiscent of the old sword and planet subgenre of speculative fiction. As such, some claim that the term science fantasy might be a more appropriate label for the books than science fiction, but Cherryh has gone to great lengths to establish that despite the low technology level of the planet, the books fall clearly within the context of her Alliance–Union science fiction universe.

== List of books ==
Novels

- Angel with the Sword (1985), C. J. Cherryh

Anthologies

- Festival Moon (1987) – Merovingen Nights #1
- Fever Season (1987) – Merovingen Nights #2
- Troubled Waters (1988) – Merovingen Nights #3
- Smuggler's Gold (1988) – Merovingen Nights #4
- Divine Right (1989) – Merovingen Nights #5
- Flood Tide (1990) – Merovingen Nights #6
- Endgame (1991) – Merovingen Nights #7

== Contributing authors ==
The following authors contributed works of short fiction to the various anthologies:

- Lynn Abbey
- Nancy Asire
- Robert Lynn Asprin
- C. J. Cherryh
- Leslie Fish
- Mercedes Lackey, who subsequently re-worked some of her contribution into Shadow of the Lion
- Chris Morris
- Janet Morris
- Roberta Rogow
- Bradley H. Sinor
