= Trust Territory (novel) =

1992 novel by Chris and Janet Morris

- Author: Janet Morris Chris Morris
- Language: English language
- Series: Threshold
- Genre: Science fiction
- Publisher: Roc
- Publication date: March 3, 1992
- Media type: Print
- Pages: 272
- ISBN: 978-0-451-45126-2
- Preceded by: Threshold
- Followed by: The Stalk

Trust Territory is a science fiction novel by American writers Chris Morris and Janet Morris, published in 1992. It is the second book of the Threshold trilogy.
