= Earth Dreams =

1982 novel by Janet Morris

- First edition
- Author: Janet Morris
- Cover artist: Don Punchatz
- Language: English
- Series: Kerrion Space
- Genre: Science fiction
- Publisher: G. P. Putnam's Sons
- Publication date: May/June 1982
- Publication place: United States
- Media type: Print
- Pages: 240
- ISBN: 0-399-12686-4
- Preceded by: Cruiser Dreams

Earth Dreams is a 1982 science fiction novel by American writer Janet Morris, the third in her Kerrion Space trilogy.

== Plot outline ==
Shebat, a dream dancer, cruiser pilot and wife of the renegade second son of the Kerrion family merchant dynasty, must challenge the greatest empire in the universe to protect and save the magnificent, sentient, space-faring cruisers from destruction, while battling political intrigues continuing from the first two volumes of the series. She and her husband, Chaeron, solidify their relationship and finally learn to work toward the same goals – not power for power’s sake, but in order to allow beauty and harmony to flourish in the universe.
