= Ofra (disambiguation) =

Ofra may refer to:

- Ofra, an Israeli settlement located in the northern West Bank
- Ofra Haza, an Israeli singer, actress and international recording artist (1957-2000)
- Ofra Harnoy, a Canadian cellist (born 1965)
- Ofra Bikel, a documentary filmmaker, and television producer
- Ofra Strauss, an Israeli businesswoman (born 1960)
- Operation Ofra, military name for an Israeli air strike on Iraq (1981)

== See also ==
- Orfi (disambiguation)
