= URF =

URF may refer to:

- Ultra Rapid Fire, a special game mode in League of Legends
- Unidentified reading frame, an open reading frame in DNA sequences
- Union of Right Forces, Russian liberal democratic political party (1999–2008)
- University Radio Falmer, student radio station for the University of Sussex
- University Research Fellowship of the Royal Society
- Urf, Arabic Islamic term referring to the custom, or 'knowledge', of a given society
- URF (Swedish Navy) or Ubåtsräddningsfarkosten, a Swedish submarine rescue vessel

== See also ==
- Urfi (disambiguation)
