= Nancy Asire =

American writer

- Born: December 29, 1945; Kansas City, Missouri, U.S.
- Died: August 11, 2021 (aged 75); St. Joseph, Missouri, U.S.
- Occupation: Author
- Writing career
- Genres: Fantasy, science fiction

Nancy Asire (December 29, 1945 – August 11, 2021) was an American fantasy and science fiction author, best known for her Twilight's Kingdoms fantasy trilogy and her contributions to the shared universe series Heroes in Hell, Sword of Knowledge and Merovingen Nights.

== Bibliography ==
=== Twilight's Kingdoms ===
- Twilight's Kingdoms (1987)
- Tears of Time (1993)
- To Fall Like Stars (1996)

=== Heroes in Hell ===
- Heroes in Hell (1986)
- Rebels in Hell (1986)
- Crusaders in Hell (1987)
- Angels in Hell (1987)
- Masters in Hell (1987)
- War in Hell (1988)
- Prophets in Hell (1989)
- Lawyers in Hell (2011)
- Rogues in Hell (2012)
- Dreamers in Hell (2013)
- Poets in Hell (2014)
- Doctors in Hell (2015)

=== Merovingen Nights ===
- Festival Moon (1987)
- Fever Season (1987)
- Troubled Waters (1988)
- Smugglers Gold (1988)
- Divine Right (1989)
- Flood Tide (1990)
- Endgame (1991)

=== Sword of Knowledge ===
- Wizard Spawn (1989) (with C. J. Cherryh)
- The Sword of Knowledge (1995; omnibus including "A Dirge for Sabis", "Wizard Spawn" and "Reap the Whirlwind") (with C. J. Cherryh, Leslie Fish and Mercedes Lackey)

Note: C. J. Cherryh was the primary writer, and worked with a different collaborator in each volume, thus Nancy Asire is listed for only Volume 2, Wizard Spawn, and the Omnibus.

=== Short stories ===
- "Table with a View" (1986)
- "A Walk in the Park" (1986)
- "By Invitation Only" (1987)
- "Cat's Tale" (1987)
- "Night Ride" (1987)
- "The Conscience of the King" (1987) (with C. J. Cherryh)
- "Houseguests" (1987)
- "Fallout" (1988)
- "By a Woman's Hand" (1988)
- "A Fish Story" (1988)
- "Fast Food" (1989)
- "Draw Me a Picture" (1989)
- "The Testing" (1990)
- "The Testing (Reprised) (#1)" (1990)
- "The Testing (Reprised) (#2)" (1990)
- "The Testing (Reprised) (#3)" (1990)
- "Bookworms" (1991)
- "Family Ties" (1991)
- "Family Ties" (Reprised) (#1) (1991)
- "Family Ties" (Reprised) (#2) (1991)
- "Owl Light" (1999) appeared in Flights of Fancy edited by Mercedes Lackey
- "The Cat Who Came to Dinner" (2003)
- "The Boogey Man's Wife" (2013) appeared in What Scares the Boogey Man? edited by John Manning
