= Cruiser Dreams =

1981 novel by Janet Morris

- Author: Janet Morris
- Cover artist: Don Punchatz
- Language: English language
- Series: Kerrion Space
- Genre: Science fiction
- Publisher: Berkley Books
- Publication date: 1981
- Media type: Print
- ISBN: 978-0-425-05382-9
- Preceded by: Dream Dancer
- Followed by: Earth Dreams

Cruiser Dreams is a 1981 science fiction novel by American writer Janet Morris, the second in her Kerrion Space trilogy.

== Plot summary ==
The Kerrions, rulers of the most far-reaching empire in the known universe, attempt to reclaim control of their empire while their renegade second son, Chaeron, retrieves Shebat, his wife, from Earth. As a qualified cruiser pilot, Shebat returns to claim her sentient cruiser and her place in the Kerrion dynasty against danger and numerous obstacles. The characters of Shebat and Chaeron, and their relationship, mature and become more complex as they adapt to each other and the circumstances they face in this second book in the series. Shebat becomes a staunch defender of the right of the space cruisers to develop their own intelligence, which threatens the control of the Kerrion Empire. The theory of "sponge" travel is explored more deeply. The story concludes in the third book, Earth Dreams.
