= Chris Morris (author) =

American novelist

Christopher Crosby Morris
- Born: 1946 (age 79–80)
- Occupations: Author; musician; defense analyst
- Spouse: Janet Morris
- Writing career
- Pen name: Chris Morris
- Genre: Fantasy

Christopher Crosby Morris (born 1946) is an American author of fiction and non-fiction, as well as a narrator, lyricist, musical composer, and singer-songwriter. He was married to author Janet Morris until her death in 2024. He writes primarily as Chris Morris, a shortened form of his name, but occasionally uses pseudonyms.

== Background ==
Chris Morris began writing music in 1966, fiction in 1984, and nonfiction in 1989. Much of his fiction and nonfiction literary work, including all of his book-length science fiction and fantasy, has been written in collaboration with his wife Janet Morris, with whom he also wrote two novels under the joint pseudonym of Daniel Stryker and one novel under the pseudonym of Casey Prescott. He has contributed short fiction to the shared universe series Thieves' World, Heroes in Hell, and Merovingen Nights. He also co-authored with Janet Morris five titles in The Sacred Band of Stepsons saga.

Chris Morris has also authored song lyrics and melodies. Notably, Chris served as chief songwriter, singer, and leader of the "Christopher Morris Band", formed in 1976, whose first members were Chris Morris, Janet Morris, Leslie Kuipers and Vince Colaiuta. The first "Christopher Morris Band" album, produced by Al Kooper of Blood, Sweat and Tears fame and featuring the Tower of Power horn section, was titled the Christopher Morris Band (MCA 2282), and released by MCA Records in 1977. The album's nine songs, all of which are sung by Morris, included eight songs written or co-written by him. The Christopher Morris Band album was reviewed by Ken Tucker in Rolling Stone. and in GIG Magazine. The Christopher Morris Band album was also one of Billboard's "Top Album Picks" (7/16/77) and listed by WBCN Boston as among WBCN's "52 Heaviest Records for 1977." The Christopher Morris Band album was also reviewed in Record World, July 23, 1977. The Christopher Morris Band was reviewed after their first major live performance as a headliner in The Boston Globe by Tom Long. Previous to that, Chris Morris was the band leader, and the original Christopher Morris Band was the core back-up band, for Al Kooper's 1976-1977 "Act Like Nothing's Wrong" national tour.

In the realm of nonfiction writing, Chris Morris has authored books and articles on military and defense matters in collaboration with Janet Morris and others. Chris Morris served as Research Director and Senior Fellow (1989–1994) at the United States Global Strategy Council, as well as Adjunct Fellow at the Center for Strategic and International Studies (1993–1995). At USGSC, Morris co-authored the nonlethal weapons concept and the seminal paper, Nonlethality: A Global Strategy, and co-led the USGSC's Nonlethality Policy Review Group. Events surrounding Morris's work in the nonlethal weapons area are chronicled in Chapter 15 of War and Anti-War, by Alvin Toffler and Heidi Toffler, (Little, Brown, 1993). In 1998–1999, Chris Morris was a member of the Council on Foreign Relations Independent Task Force on Nonlethal Technologies and his views are reflected in the associated report, Nonlethal Technologies: Progress and Prospects, Council on Foreign Relations, 1999. He served in 2003–2004 as a member of the Council on Foreign Relations Independent Task Force on Nonlethal Weapons, which produced the report Nonlethal Weapons and Capabilities in 2004.

== Fiction Bibliography ==
=== Thieves' World shared universe ===
- "What Women Do Best" (1984) (with Janet Morris) in Blood Ties, Asprin & Abbey, ed.
- "Red Light, Love Light" (1988) in Uneasy Alliances, Asprin & Abbey, ed.

=== The Sacred Band of Stepsons saga ===
- City at the Edge of Time (1988) (with Janet Morris)
- Tempus Unbound (1989) (with Janet Morris)
- Storm Seed (1990) (with Janet Morris)
- The Sacred Band (2010) (with Janet Morris)
- The Fish the Fighters and the Song-girl (2010) (with Janet Morris)

=== Heroes in Hell ===
- The Little Helliad (1988) (with Janet Morris)

=== Threshold ===
- Threshold (1990) (with Janet Morris)
- Trust Territory (1992) (with Janet Morris)
- The Stalk (1994) (with Janet Morris)

=== Merovingen Nights ===
- Festival Moon (1987) (with Janet Morris)
- Fever Season (1987)
- Troubled Waters (1988)
- Divine Right (1989)
- Flood Tide (1990) (with Janet Morris)
- Endgame (1991) (with Janet Morris)

=== Other novels ===
- The 40-Minute War (1984) (with Janet Morris)
- Medusa (1986) (with Janet Morris)
- Outpassage (1988) (with Janet Morris)
- Hawkeye (1991) (with Janet Morris, as by Daniel Stryker)
- Cobra (1991) (with Janet Morris, as by Daniel Stryker)
- Asset In Black (1985) (with Janet Morris, as Casey Prescott)

=== Short stories ===
- “Cross-Currents“ (1984)
- “What Women Do Best“ (1984) (with Janet Morris)
- "Undercover Angel" (1986)
- “Sanctuary Is for Lovers“ (1986) (with Janet Morris)
- "Son of the Morning" (1986)
- “The Shattered Sphere“ (1986)
- "Snowballs in Hell" (1987)
- "The Nature of Hell" (1987) (with Janet Morris)
- "Sword Play" (1987) (with Janet Morris)
- "Night Action" (1987)
- "Hearts and Minds" (1987)
- "Handmaids in Hell" (1987)
- "The Ransom of Hellcat" (1987)
- "Saying Yes to Drugs" (1987)
- “Battle for the Plain of Just Desserts“ (1988) (with Janet Morris)
- "Sign On" (1988)
- "Mystery" (1988) (with Janet Morris)
- “Red Light, Love Light“ (1988)
- “Eye of a Needle“ (1989)
- "Postpartum Blues (1989)
- "Rapproachment" (1990) (with Janet Morris)
- “The Price of Victory“ (1990)
- "Escape from Merovingen: Finale in Two Acts - Act One: The Fool Must Die" (1991) (with Janet Morris)
- "Escape from Merovingen: Finale in Two Acts - Act Two: Escape From Merovingen" (1991) (with Janet Morris)
- "Escape from Merovingen (Act One Reprised)" (1991) (with Janet Morris)
- "Escape from Merovingen (Act One Reprised) (#2)" (1991) (with Janet Morris)
- "Interview with the Devil" (2011) (with Janet Morris)
- "Erra and the Seven" (2011)
- "Babe in Hell" (2012) (with Janet Morris)
- "Battle of Tartaros" (2012)
- "Fools in Hell" (2013)
- "Alms for Oblivion" (2013) (with Janet Morris)
- "Words" (2014)
- "Seven Against Hell" (2014) (with Janet Morris)
- The Black Sword" (2014) (with Janet Morris)

== Select Non-Fiction Bibliography ==
- Nonlethality: A Global Strategy (1990, 2010) (with Janet Morris)
- Weapons of Mass Protection (1995) (with Morris and Baines)
- The American Warrior (1992) (Morris and Morris, ed.)

== Discography ==
- Christopher Morris Band, (MCA 2282), 1977
- Everybody Knows - Christopher Crosby Morris (Singing Horse), 2016
