= Dream Dancer =

1980 novel by Janet Morris

- First edition UK)
- Author: Janet Morris
- Cover artist: Peter Andrew Jones
- Language: English language
- Series: Kerrion Space
- Genre: Science fiction
- Publisher: Fontana Books (UK); Berkley Books (US)
- Publication date: 1980
- Media type: Print
- ISBN: 978-0-399-12591-1
- Followed by: Cruiser Dreams

Dream Dancer is a 1980 science fiction novel by American writer Janet Morris, the first in her Kerrion Empire trilogy. It was distributed in the US by Putnam in March 1981.

== Plot summary ==
Marada, renegade second son of the most powerful family in space, the Kerrions, both a corporation and a political entity, is saved from a mob by 16-year-old Shebat on a primitive Earth. In her debt, he allows her to accompany him into his high-tech world, adopting her, to protect her from a political purgatory. The Kerrions rule their merchant empire from their headquarters on Draconis. Marada becomes a political sacrifice to a rival family, the Labaya, marrying the rival's second daughter, Madel, and relinquishing his role as Shebat's protector. Shebat is kidnapped and becomes a Dream Dancer (an illegal practice, not necessarily approved by all as it can become addictive to its users) and acquires the ability to read the future. She is rescued by the third Kerrion son, Chaeron, whom she marries to avoid criminal charges. She and Chaeron work together sometimes, but also against each other and the family interests. Shebat must learn to deal with those who control the destiny of millions of people – and to whom treachery, betrayal and murder are part of doing business.

The Kerrion Empire's semi-sentient Cruisers fly through "sponge" space and give the Kerrions vast control over the majority of the civilizations encompassed by the Kerrion Empire. Against considerable odds, Shebat qualifies as a cruiser pilot, which involves interacting with the cruiser’s intelligence. In the midst of a family political crisis, certain members of the Kerrion Family see Chaeron’s new bride as a threat to their power and arrange for her to be sent back to Earth and stranded there.
