= Orfi (magician) =

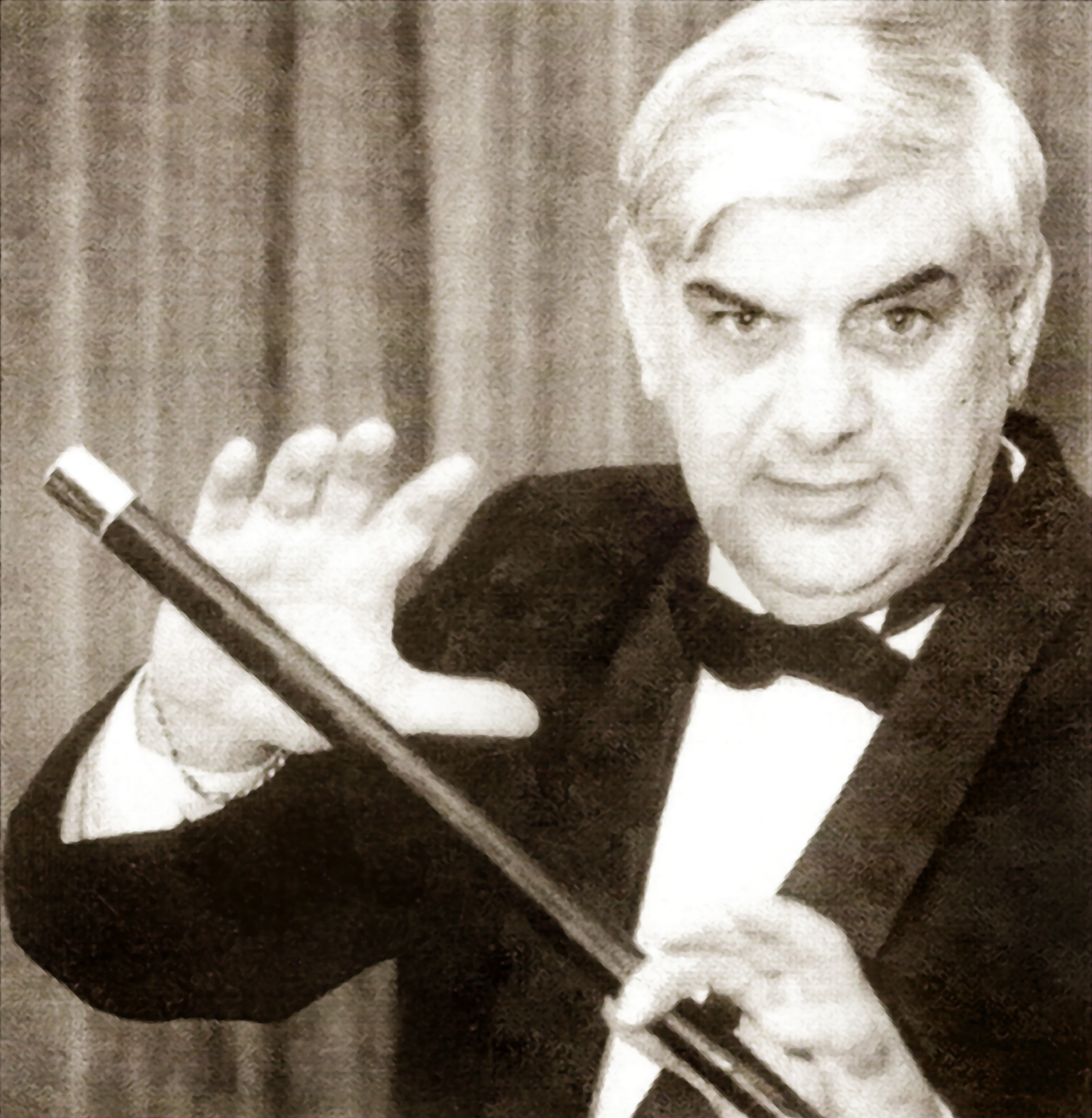
- Born: Vasil Stefanov Nikolaev (Bulgarian: Васил Стефанов Николаев); 1 June 1943; Silistra, Bulgaria
- Died: 20 November 1999 (aged 56); Sofia, Bulgaria
- Occupation: Magician
- Spouse: Luybka (Bulgarian: Любка)

Vasil Stefanov Nikolaev (Bulgarian: Васил Стефанов Николаев) (1 June 1943 - 20 November 1999) aka. Orfi (Bulgarian: Орфи) was an award-winning illusionist and director from Bulgaria.

== Biography ==
Vasil Nikolaev was born in Silistra, in northeastern Bulgaria, on 1 June 1943. In 1947 he moved to the other side of the country when his father Stefan Nikolaev took a job as a director of musical theatre in the capital Sofia. A frequent visitor to the family home there was illusionist Mister Senko and young Vasil became fascinated by illusions. In 1959, at the age of 16, Vasil passed an audition to be allowed to become a professional performer. He began doing magic under the stage name Orfi, derived from the Bulgarian name for Orpheus, from Greek mythology.

In early 1962 Orfi decided he needed an assistant and recruited an acquaintance named Luybka, who had stage experience because her parents had encouraged her to perform in drama productions and poetry readings from an early age. She was due to go to a job as a secretary in September that year but agreed to join Orfi for a tour of Bulgaria in the interim. The two became lovers and, so that they could stay together, when the time came for Lybuka to go they told her parents they were engaged. Their plans were interrupted when Lyubka became seriously ill with hepatitis. While she was in hospital they became engaged properly. The two went into the army together and performed as a duo in the army's entertainment corps. They were married in 1963 and continued as partners on and off stage for 36 years until Orfi's death.

Orfi and Lyubka established themselves as a well known act within Bulgaria but despite this they could not afford to buy expensive props from abroad as some of their fellow magicians had done. This forced Orfi to rely on his ingenuity to devise ways of achieving similar effects using his own methods and props that he could build himself. In 1976 the duo won the "grand prix" at the first national festival of magicians in Bulgaria. As their success and reputation grew they were able to tour to countries including the US, the USSR, Italy, Spain, Morocco, Switzerland and Algeria. In 1982 they won a silver medal in the stage illusion category of the International Federation of Magic Societies (FISM) championships, held that year in Lausanne, Switzerland.

Orfi became a prominent figure in Bulgaria's professional magic community and a director of various shows and events. Together with his close friend and fellow magician Astor he was founder of a Bulgarian magic society and organiser of national magic festivals. In 1986 Orfi was appointed general director of the Bulgarian national circus.

Orfi died suddenly of a stroke in Sofia on 20 November 1999 at the age of 56. He had suffered from diabetes but his widow said there were no prior signs that he was seriously ill.

== Family ==
Orfi was the younger brother of actor Nikolay Nikolaev.
