= Janet Morris =

American fantasy and science fiction author (born 1946)

Janet Ellen Morris
- Born: May 25, 1946
- Died: August 10, 2024 (aged 78)
- Occupations: Author, defense analyst
- Spouse: Chris Morris
- Writing career
- Genres: Fantasy, science fiction, historical novels

Janet Ellen Morris (1946–2024) was an American author of fiction and nonfiction, best known for her fantasy and science fiction and her authorship of a non-lethal weapons concept for the U.S. military.

== Background ==
=== Writing ===
Janet Morris began writing in 1976 and published more than forty novels, many co-authored with her husband Chris Morris or others. Her debut novel, written as Janet E. Morris, was High Couch of Silistra, the first in a quartet of character-driven novels with a female protagonist. According to original publisher Bantam Books, the Silistra quartet had over four million copies in print when the fourth volume, The Carnelian Throne was published. Charles N. Brown, co-founder and editor of Locus magazine, is quoted on the Baen Books reissues of the series, noting that the stories featured "engrossing characters in a marvelous adventure."

Morris contributed short fiction to the shared universe fantasy series Thieves' World, in which she created the Sacred Band of Stepsons, a mythical unit of ancient fighters modeled on the Sacred Band of Thebes.

She created, orchestrated, and edited the Bangsian fantasy series Heroes in Hell, writing stories for the series as well as co-writing the related novel, The Little Helliad, with Chris Morris.

Most of her fiction work was in the fantasy and science fiction genres, although she also wrote historical and other novels. Her 1983 book I, the Sun, a detailed biographical novel about the Hittite King Suppiluliuma I was praised for its historical accuracy; Oliver Gurney, Hittite scholar and author of The Hittites, commented that "the author is familiar with every aspect of Hittite culture."

Morris wrote, contributed to, or edited several book-length works of non-fiction, as well as papers and articles on non-lethal weapons, developmental military technology and other defense and national security topics.

=== Academic, strategic and business activity ===
Morris was elected to the New York Academy of Sciences in 1980. Morris served as Research Director and Senior Fellow (1989–1994) at the U.S. Global Strategy Council, as well as Adjunct Fellow at the Center for Strategic and International Studies (1993–1995). Morris co-authored The Warriors Edge, which explores embracing unconventional psychological combat techniques, in 1990. Janet Morris and the USGSC's campaign for the creation of a non-lethality panel resulted in the assembly of the Non-Lethality Policy Review Group, led by Major General Chris S. Adams, USAF (ret.) in 1991. The group earned the political backing of Sam Nunn, chair of the United States Senate Committee on Armed Services. Janet Morris published numerous white papers in 1991, detailing the USGSC's non-lethal war doctrine proposals. The papers promoted diversifying and expanding non-lethal weapon capability for use in increased American intervention in global conflicts. The papers urged additional development of anti-personnel incapacitants as well as vehicular area denial devices.

In 1991, Morris visited the Moscow Institute of Psycho-Correlations and observed the demonstration of the transmission of subliminal commands via infrasound.

In 1995, Morris and her husband founded M2 Technologies. After that time, their writing output decreased in proportion to the increasing success of the company, which works with U.S. federal and military agencies on non-lethal weapon systems, novel technology applications, and software.

In 2003 and 2004, she served on the Council on Foreign Relations Independent Task Force on Nonlethal Weapons and Capabilities and contributed to the Task Force report, Nonlethal Weapons and Capabilities (2004).

=== Equestrian ===
A lifelong horsewoman, Morris and her husband bred Thoroughbreds from 2003 to 2013 and afterwards maintained a World-Champion producing Morgan horse breeding program begun in 1996. Her foundation mare, "UVM Christine" (pictured above), won Morgan Grand National Champion Four-Year-Old Mare, World Champion Senior Mare, and Reserve World Champion Mare in 1998.

Other Grand National and Reserve Grand National and World Champions followed, including Reserve World Champion and Reserve Grand National Champion Park Horse, "Pastorale" in 2001 and 2002; homebred Grand National Champion Morgan Snaffle-Bit Reining Horse, "Spring Diva", in 2003; Grand National Champion Pleasure Driving Gelding "Burkland Rafinesque" in 2008; and homebreds "Privilege", World Champion Western Pleasure in 2014; and "Concordia", World Champion Pleasure Driving in 2018. The Morrises' Morgan breeding program was featured on the cover and in a profile article in Equine International in 2009.

== Select fiction bibliography ==
=== Silistra ===
- High Couch of Silistra (1977) aka Returning Creation
- The Golden Sword (1977)
- Wind from the Abyss (1978)
- The Carnelian Throne (1979)

=== Kerrion Empire ===
- Dream Dancer (1980)
- Cruiser Dreams (1981)
- Earth Dreams (1982)

=== Threshold (with Chris Morris) ===
- Threshold (1990)
- Trust Territory (1992)
- The Stalk (1994)

=== ARC Riders (with David Drake) ===
- ARC Riders (1995)
- The Fourth Rome (1996)

=== Novels ===
- I, the Sun (1983)
- The 40-Minute War (1984) (with Chris Morris)
- Active Measures (1985) (with David Drake)
- Afterwar (1985)
- Medusa (1986) (with Chris Morris)
- Warlord! (1987)
- Kill Ratio (1987) (with David Drake)
- Outpassage (1988) (with Chris Morris)
- Target (1989) (with David Drake)

=== Series contributed to ===
- Merovingen Nights
- The Fleet
- War World
- Thieves' World

=== The Sacred Band of Stepsons saga ===
- Beyond Sanctuary (1985)
- Beyond the Veil (1985)
- Beyond Wizardwall (1986)
- Tempus (1987)
- City at the Edge of Time (1988) (with Chris Morris)
- Tempus Unbound (1989) (with Chris Morris)
- Storm Seed (1990) (with Chris Morris)
- The Sacred Band (2010) (with Chris Morris)
- The Fish the Fighters and the Song-girl (2012) (with Chris Morris)

=== Heroes in Hell ===
- Heroes in Hell (1986)
- The Gates of Hell (1986) (with C J Cherryh)
- Rebels in Hell (1986) (with C J Cherryh)
- Crusaders in Hell (1987)
- Angels in Hell (1987)
- Masters in Hell (1987)
- Kings in Hell (1987) (with C J Cherryh)
- The Little Helliad (1988) (with Chris Morris)
- War in Hell (1988)
- Prophets in Hell (1989)
- Explorers in Hell (1989) (with David Drake)
- Lawyers in Hell (2011) (edited with Chris Morris)
- Bridge Over Hell (2012) (Michael A. Armstrong)
- Poets in Hell (2014) (edited with Chris Morris)
- Dreamers in Hell (2013) (edited with Chris Morris)
- Poets in Hell (2014) (edited with Chris Morris)
- Doctors in Hell (2015) (edited with Chris Morris)
- Hellbound (2015) (Andrew P. Weston)
- Pirates in Hell (2017) (edited with Chris Morris)
- Hell Hounds (2017) (Andrew P. Weston)
- Lovers in Hell (2018) (edited with Chris Morris)
- Hell Gate (2019) (Andrew P. Weston)

== Select short story bibliography ==
- "Raising the Green Lion" (1980)
- "Vashanka's Minion" (1980)
- "A Man and His God" (1981)
- "An End to Dreaming" (1982)
- "Wizard Weather" (1982)
- "High Moon" (1983)
- "Basileus" (1984)
- "Hero's Welcome" (1985)
- "Graveyard Shift" (1986)
- "To Reign in Hell" (1986)
- "Power Play" (1984)
- "Pillar of Fire" (1984)
- "Gilgamesh Redux" (1987)
- "Sea of Stiffs" (1987)
- "The Nature of Hell" (1987)
- "The Best of the Achaeans" (1988)
- "The Collaborator" (1988)
- "[...] Is Hell" (1988)
- "Moving Day" (1989)
- "Sea Change" (1989)
- "Interview with the Devil" (2011) (with Chris Morris)
- "Tribe of Hell" (2011)
- "Babe in Hell" (2012) (with Chris Morris)(2012)
- "Which Way I Fly Is Hell" (2012)
- "Boogey Man Blues" (2013) appeared in What Scares the Boogey Man? edited by John Manning
- "Hell Bent" (2013)
- "Alms for Oblivion" (2013) (with Chris Morris)
- "Dress Rehearsal" (2014)
- "Seven Against Hell" (2014) (with Chris Morris)
- "The Black Sword" (2014) (with Chris Morris) appeared in Nine Heroes edited by Walter Rhein

== Select non-fiction bibliography ==
- "Nonlethality: A Global Strategy" (1990, 2010) (with Chris Morris)
- "Weapons of Mass Protection" (1995) (with Morris and Baines)
- The American Warrior (1992) (Morris and Morris, ed.)
