= Bill Kerby =

American screenwriter (1937–2026)

- Born: December 13, 1937; Buffalo, New York, U.S.
- Died: August 13, 2026 (aged 88); Whidbey Island, Washington, U.S.
- Education: Kent State University; University of California, Los Angeles
- Occupation: Screenwriter

Bill Kerby (December 13, 1937 – August 13, 2026) was an American screenwriter for several Hollywood films and television series. He wrote and co-wrote the 1970s films Hooper and The Rose.

== Education and early career ==
Kerby received a B.A. from Kent State University in 1962 and an M.F.A. from UCLA; where he was a Louis B. Mayer grant winner and teaching assistant, graduating in 1969.

He served in the United States Marine Corps, 1955–58, and was an actor and Welfare Investigator in New York City in the early 1960s. He also taught at Sherwood Oaks School, in Los Angeles, in the 1970s, and the Summer writers' workshop at the National Film and Television School of England from 1985 to 1990.

== Death ==
Kerby died in Whidbey Island, Washington on August 13, 2026, at the age of 88.

== Writing career ==
=== Film ===
- Last American Hero, starring Jeff Bridges and Valerie Perrine, 20th Century Fox, 1973, uncredited.
- The Gravy Train, starring Stacy Keach, Frederic Forrest, and Margot Kidder, Columbia, 1974, co-written.
- Hooper, starring Burt Reynolds, Sally Field, Brian Keith, and Jan Michael Vincent, Warner Bros., 1977, co-screenplay.
- Firepower, starring James Coburn. Sophia Loren, Eli Wallach, and O. J. Simpson, ITC, story by.
- The Rose, starring Bette Midler, Alan Bates, and Frederic Forrest, Columbia, 1978, Academy Award nominations for Midler, Forrest, Best Music, Best Sound, Co-screenplay, sole story by.
- Dead Men Can't Dance, starring Michael Biehn, Kathleen York, Adrian Paul, and R. Lee Ermey, Live Entertainment, 1997, co-screenplay.

=== Television ===
- Alfred Hitchcock Presents, two episodes
- Steel Cowboy, movie-of-the-week, CBS, 1976.
- Dada is Death, CBS mini-series, 1989, best teleplay nomination from Australian Film Institute, written-by.
- Lakota Woman: Siege at Wounded Knee, for Turner Network Television and Fonda Films, 1994, winner American Indian Film Festival, winner First Americans in the Arts, winner best TV film and screenplay by the National Cowboy Hall of Fame, nominee Humanitas Award for best teleplay.
- Shake Rattle and Roll, CBS mini-series, part 2, co-teleplay.
- Little Richard, NBC movie, 2000, co-written.
- On the Beach, Showtime, 2000, co-teleplay, mini-series nominated for Golden Globe, 2001.
- Hatfields & McCoys, History Channel, 6 hr. miniseries, highest rated non-sports cable show in TV history as of 2012, co-story by, all three nights. Nominated in 2012 for Primetime Emmy Award for Outstanding Writing for a Miniseries, Movie or a Dramatic Special. This miniseries also won the Writer's Guild Award for Best Longform Teleplay 2013. Kevin Costner won Golden Globe, Emmy and Screen Actors Guild awards for his role.
