= The Golden Sword (novel) =

1977 novel by Janet Morris

- First edition
- Author: Janet Morris
- Language: English
- Series: High Couch of Silistra
- Genre: Science fantasy
- Publisher: Bantam Books
- Publication date: 1977
- Publication place: United States
- Media type: Print (paperback)
- ISBN: 0-553-11276-7
- Preceded by: High Couch of Silistra
- Followed by: Wind from the Abyss

The Golden Sword, published in 1977, is a science fantasy novel by American writer Janet Morris, the second title in her High Couch of Silistra series.

== Setting ==
In the southern hemisphere of Silistra lie the Parset Lands, an arid zone home to five semi-nomadic tribes that share a common history. Parset tribes are descended partially but markedly from dark skinned inhabitants of pre-apocalyptic Silistra. Due to Parset Day-Keepers' differences with other Day-Keepers sourcing from their adoption of the Tar-Kesa cult and since the Parset Lands were never truly pacified unlike the rest of Silistra, a Well system could not be established. The power structure in Parset tribes is shared by Day-Keepers and military leaders named cahndors. Slavery is widely practised. However, the Parset Lands are foremost prominent in growing the drugs used to produce longevity serums that support the planet's otherwise aging population.

== Plot summary ==
Estri, the Well-Keepress of Astria and High Couch of Silistra, the highest office in the land, has continued her quest to locate her god-like "Shaper" father to his home planet, Mi'ysten, where she is tested and shown to have inherited his powers.

Following further training in the ability to manipulate time and probabilities with her mind, Estri is abruptly returned to Silistra after an absence of two local years. Many changes have taken place in the power vacuum her absence left and Estri must conquer her immediate captor, Chayin, Cahndor of the violent Parset desert tribes, in order to continue her quest to save the Silistran people who are dying out from infertility.

The Parset tribes cultivate and grow the plants from which the costly longevity drugs sold throughout the Bipedal Federation are made. Renegade members of the Bipedal Federation offer proscribed hi-tech weapons to leaders of the warring tribes in exchange for exclusive access to the longevity drugs, assuring that tribe’s domination of the rest. Chayin rejects their offer, knowing it will end in the destruction of his people from greed and power. The BF keeps counting on at least one tribal leader's greed to eventually agree to accept their offer, allowing one tribe to conquer all others with off-world weapons.

Estri and Chayin must find Sereth, former Slayer of Estri's home who aided her in beginning her quest and was made outcast afterward (because Estri disappeared under his protection). Estri, Chayin and Sereth must join in a triad, forging a bond created by their innate powers and intense love to assure the future of the planet.

After they defeat Chayin's various tribal opponents, they conquer Estri's enemy of hundreds of years, her father's grandson, Raet, and hope they can have a respite from tribulation. However, Khys, the semi-mythical, usurper overlord of the planet, abducts the triad to his sacred city and binds Estri with a device that suppresses her powers and causes her to lose her memory. With Estri in his control, he elevates Chayin to be his puppet overlord of all the Parset, but leaves active Chayin’s own in-born powers that may drive him insane. Khys forces Sereth into the role of a “trusted” vassal who remembers everything about Estri, Chayin and their pasts.

Helpless before his power, Chayin and Sereth cannot stop Khys from impregnating an unsuspecting Estri to take advantage of her "Shaper" genetics. Khys gloats, triumphant in assuring himself a powerful and gifted heir, while believing no being in the universe is powerful enough to deny him what he truly desires: return of the technology that nearly destroyed the planet and forced the population underground into "hides" until their world recovered enough from the devastation to support life again.
