= 'Orfi Shirazi =

Persian poet (1555–1591)

Orfi Shirazi
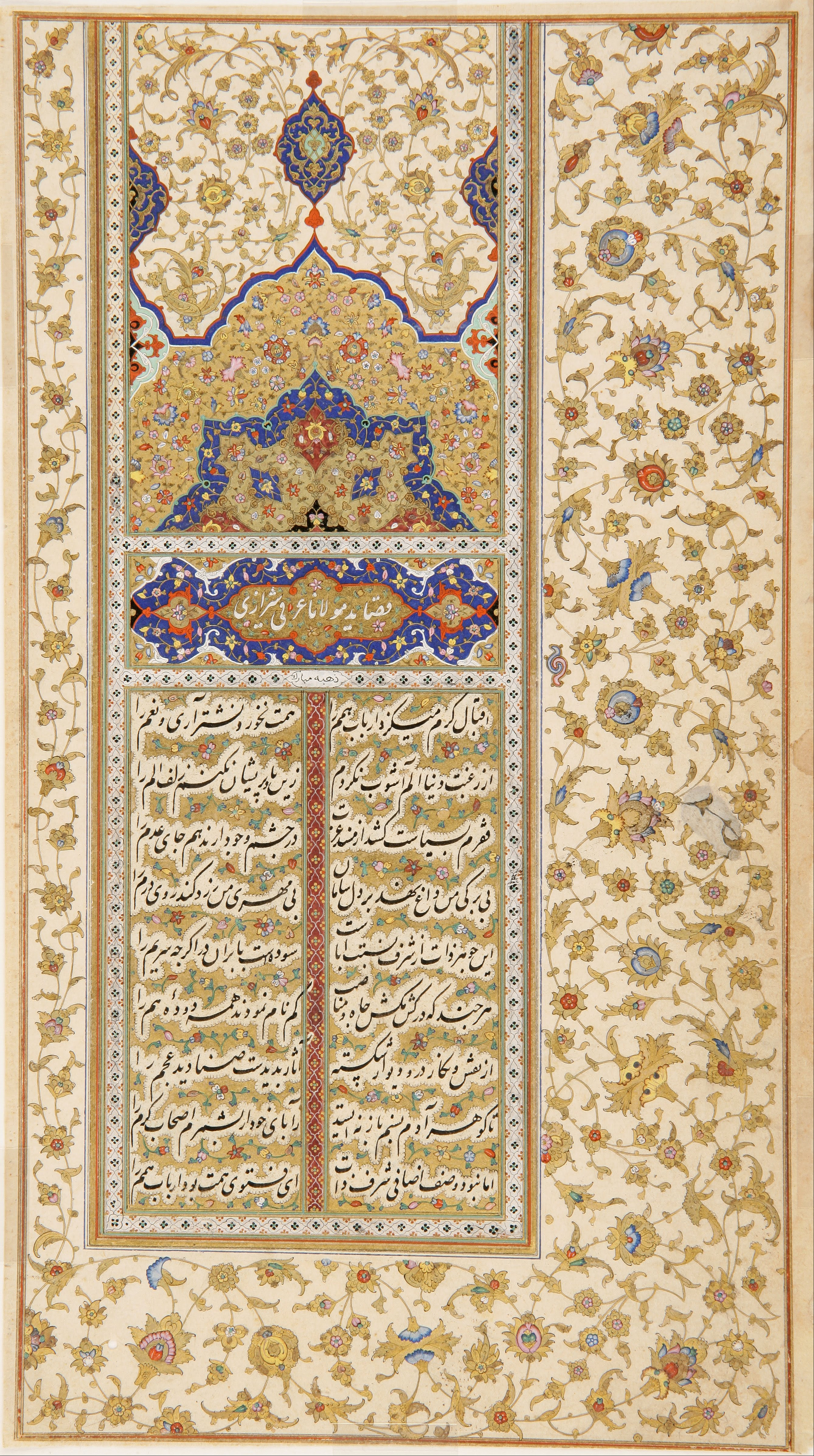
- Native name: عرفی شیرازی
- Born: 1555 Shiraz, Safavid Iran
- Died: August 1591 (aged 35–36) Lahore, Mughal Empire
- Resting place: Imam Ali Shrine, Najaf, Iraq
- Occupation: Poet
- Language: Persian

Jamāl-al-Din Moḥammad Sidi (1555–1591), known by his pen-name Urfi, or Orfi or Urfi Shirazi (Persian: عرفی شیرازی), was a 16th-century Persian poet.

He was born in Shiraz and in his youth, he migrated to India and became one of the poets of the court of Akbar the Great. He is one of the most prominent Persian poets of Indian style.
