= Classic BattleTech =

Tactic wargame (1985)

BattleTech
- Designers: Jordan Weisman; L. Ross Babcock III; Sam Lewis
- Publishers: FASA (1984-2001); FanPro LLC (2001-2007); Catalyst Game Labs (2007-Present)
- Years active: 1984 to present
- Players: 2+
- Setup time: 5–30 minutes
- Playing time: No exact time
- Chance: Dice rolling
- Age range: 12+
- Skills: Tactical, Arithmetic
- Website: https://www.catalystgamelabs.com/brands/battletech

Classic BattleTech is a table-top wargame set in the fictional BattleTech universe that simulates combat between futuristic mechanized forces. Originally published by FASA Corporation, the game is now produced by Catalyst Game Labs under license from WizKids. The term "Classic" is used to differentiate the original game from variants and related games that have derived from it, such as MechWarrior: Dark Age. The game has an extensive range of 1/285 scale miniatures.

== Gameplay ==
BattleTech is a turn-based multiplayer game, typically played on a map divided into hexagonal grids with figurines or counters representing military units. Paper record sheets provide detailed information about each unit, including its armament, armor and equipment, and are used to track damage, heat buildup, ammunition and various other data. Players use two six-sided dice to determine variable results, such as whether a shot strikes its target and the location it hits.

Of the units represented in the game, the most common are BattleMechs, also known as 'Mechs: large, semi-humanoid fighting machines controlled by human pilots. While pre-designed 'Mechs, vehicles, and other military units are provided with the game, a complex system of design rules allows players to create their own custom units even in the introductory boxed set.

== History ==
FASA Corporation published the first BattleTech game set in 1984 as BattleDroids, and throughout the '80s and '90s released a wide range of supplemental books and materials for the series. FASA ceased producing BattleTech in 2001 and sold the franchise to WizKids. FanPro licensed the rights from WizKids and under the new name Classic Battletech continued to release sourcebooks and supplements. In June 2007, Catalyst Game Labs (a subsidiary of InMediaRes Productions, LLC) acquired the license to Classic BattleTech, and has reiterated its commitment to publishing quality products. Catalyst also retained many of the staff members who worked for FanPro. Catalyst Game Labs also reverted the name back to BattleTech in celebration of the 25th anniversary of the game's release.

== Publications ==
Maximum Tech (1997), a Classic BattleTech publication.

The latest iteration of the BattleTech rules is Total Warfare (2006), a streamlined compendium intended to integrate the numerous rules sets that have governed the series into a single, comprehensive volume that details the tournament legal and/or standard rules set for game play. Total Warfare is supplemented by six or more other books (some pending):

- 25th Anniversary Introductory Box Set, the fifth edition of the introductory box set includes all of the materials a player needs to play the game. The set includes a "quick-start" rulebook as well as a standard rulebook, plastic miniatures and record sheets of many common BattleMechs, two heavy cardboard game boards with reversible maps, and Inner Sphere at a Glance, a book detailing the game's universe.
- Total Warfare, the primary rulebook for BattleTech. It also includes the rules for playing the air combat game of AeroTech as well.
- TechManual, which presents the design rules for making custom units that comply with the standard game play rules.
- Tactical Operations, offering advanced rules and advanced or experimental equipment beyond those in Total Warfare and TechManual. In 2020, this product was split into Tactical Operations: Advanced Units & Equipment, and Tactical Operations: Advanced Rules.
- Strategic Operations, updating BattleForce 2 & Aerotech 2 Revised to provide a faster-paced or large-scale version of the game as well as adding advanced rules campaign elements such as repair, customization & salvage to the tactical game.
- Interstellar Operations, advanced rules to allow the player become star lords of Succession State or Khan of their respective Clan. This is similar to previous FASA product named Succession Wars and rules found in FanPro source book named Combat Operations.
- A Time of War (BattleTech Roleplaying Game, fourth edition), describing how to create characters and run RPG missions.

FanPro intended these six books to be the official core rules set that will govern all gameplay within the BattleTech franchise, be it ground combat, space combat or role-playing. Since 2007, Catalyst Game Labs has assumed control of the franchise. The core rule plans are continuing to be refined as rule books come out.

== Reception ==
Scott Tanner reviewed BattleTech in Space Gamer/Fantasy Gamer No. 78. Tanner commented that "All in all, the BattleTech system is a very welcome addition to the gaming world, and is a worthwhile investment for those interested in the subject matter."

Stephan Wieck reviewed Battletech in White Wolf #7 (1987), rating it an 8 out of 10 and stated that "if the true test of any game is its playability, then Battletech is a good system. It is extremely easy to gamemaster and fun to play, at an hourly price that eventually beats the movies.."

Ashley Watkins reviewed BattleTech for Adventurer magazine and stated that "Battletech has real science fiction flavour, and it's not often that the elements of playability and background come together in an SF game."

Dale L. Kemper reviewed BattleTech for Different Worlds magazine and stated that "All in all Battletech is a good introduction to the universe of the Succession Wars. It should whet your appetite for more and FASA plans on giving it to you. With all the add-on games and rules, Battletech will be around for some time to come."

Alex Bund reviewed the 4th edition of BattleTech for Arcane magazine, rating it an 8 out of 10 overall, and stated that "BattleTech 4th Edition does exactly what it sets out to do - introduce players to the world of BattleTech. For those roleplayers who feel they want more after fighting a few battles, there is an enormous range of expansion material for the game, both in terms of rules additions and background material. But in the meantime, BattleTech 4th Edition has everything you need to wage war in the 31st century."

In 1997, the fourth edition of BattleTech won the Origins Award for Best Graphic Presentation of a Board Game of 1996.

Classic BattleTech won the 2007 Origins Award for Best Miniatures Rules of the Year.

The original BattleTech was inducted into the Origins Hall of Fame.

== Reviews ==
- Casus Belli #32 (Apr 1986)
- Australian Realms #10
- Australian Realms #30
- Analog Science Fiction and Fact
- G.M. The Independent Fantasy Roleplaying Magazine #1

== Supplements ==
- BattleTech: Map Set 1 (1985)
- Tales of the Black Widow Company (1985)
- Cranston Snord's Irregulars (1986)
- Gray Death Legion (1986)
- The Fox's Teeth: Exploits of McKinnon's Raiders (1986)
- Technical Readout: 3025 (1986)
- BattleTech Manual: The Rules of Warfare (1987)
- The Galtor Campaign (1987)
- House Kurita: The Draconis Combine (1987)
- House Steiner: The Lyran Commonwealth (1987)
- Mercenary's Handbook (1987)
- Sorenson's Sabres (1987)
- Technical Readout: 3026 (Vehicles and Personal Equipment) (1987)
- Dropships and Jumpships (1988)
- The Fourth Succession War Military Atlas Volume 1 (1988)
- House Liao: The Capellan Confederation (1988)
- House Marik: The Free Worlds League (1988)
- BattleTech Compendium (1990)
- BattleTech Tactical Handbook (1994)
- The Periphery (1995)
- Technical Readout: 3058 (1995)
- BattleTech Record Sheets (1996)
- The Fall of Terra (1996)
- First Strike (1996)
- Explorer Corps (1996)
- BattleTech: The Battle of Coventry (1996)

== See also ==
- MechWarrior, the original role-playing game
- BattleTechnology magazine (1987–1995)
- HeavyMetal design software
