= BattleTech Manual: The Rules of Warfare =

1987 tabletop game supplement

BattleTech Manual: The Rules of Warfare is a 1987 tabletop game supplement published by FASA for BattleTech.

== Contents ==
BattleTech Manual: The Rules of Warfare is a supplement in which a comprehensive rules supplement consolidates and expands the gameplay systems from BattleTech, CityTech, and AeroTech into a single volume.

== Publication history ==
Battletech Manual - The Rules of Warfare was written by Jordan Weisman, L. Ross Babcock III, Forest Brown, Sam Lewis, and Wheeler with a cover by Les Dorscheid and published by FASA in 1987 as a 104-page book. The book was also published by Jedko Games of Australia in 1988.

This book was later superseded by the BattleTech Compendium.

== Reviews ==
- GM #2
