= BattleTech: The Animated Series =

- Title card
- Also known as: BattleTech
- Based on: BattleTech by: Sam Lewis; L. Ross Babcock III
- Written by: Robert N. Skir; Marty Isenberg
- Starring: Sean Bushe; Richard Dean; Roxxy Dakota; Keith Chihara; Mark McAffrey; Bernard Bear; Guy de Mouchenique; Steve Kramer; Christina Forrest; Patricia Ja Lee; Brian Tochi; David Lodge
- Composers: Shuki Levy; Haim Saban
- Country of origin: United States
- No. of episodes: 13 (plus one special)

Production
- Executive producers: Joel Andryc; Eric S. Rollman; Sam Lewis; Jordan Weismann
- Producer: Kurt Weldon
- Running time: 23 minutes
- Production companies: Saban Entertainment; Worldwide Sports and Entertainment; FASA Corporation

Original release
- Network: First-run syndication
- Release: September 10 – December 10, 1994

BattleTech is an animated television series based on the BattleTech fictional universe, produced for syndication by Saban Entertainment in 1994. Written by Robert N. Skir and Marty Isenberg, the series ran for 13 episodes and focused on the character of Adam Steiner, a military officer in the distant future who struggles to liberate his home planet from an attacking faction.

The series was noteworthy for its blending of animation techniques, with computer animation used to depict most battle sequences and traditional animation used for most other scenes.

Ownership of the series passed to Disney in 2001 when Disney acquired Fox Kids Worldwide, which included Saban Entertainment.

== Story ==
The series takes place in the year 3050 as the Inner Sphere, the central region of settled interstellar space, is suddenly invaded by a powerful human faction identifying itself as the Clans. One of the many planets that falls to the Clan onslaught is a small, mostly unimportant world in the Federated Commonwealth called Somerset.

Far away on the planet Tharkad, Major Adam Steiner, a teacher at the Nagelring Military Academy and native of Somerset, receives word of the attack on his homeworld and the loss of all communication with the forces there, including his brother Andrew. Using his relationship to one of the Federated Commonwealth's ruling family, he gains permission to assemble a force to gather intelligence on the Clans and, if possible, liberate Somerset.

Unfortunately for Steiner, the only available JumpShip is the Katana, a Draconis Combine spacecraft recently seized for smuggling. The early episodes focus on Steiner recruiting and developing his team and reconciling differences between them, particularly between the Draconis JumpShip crew and the Federated Commonwealth soldiers, while gathering information about the Clans and their technology.

After several successes, Steiner's unit is given BattleMechs enhanced with stolen Clan technology and begin offensive missions against the Clans, culminating in a Trial of Possession for the planet Somerset. Steiner wins the duel, but the Clan commander, honouring the letter of the deal, gives Steiner the planet but keeps the planet's population as prisoners. The series ends with Steiner vowing to rescue the people of Somerset.

== Characters ==
=== 1st Somerset Strikers ===
- Adam Steiner – An instructor at the Federated Commonwealth's prestigious Nagelring Military Academy and a native of the planet Somerset, Adam is a proponent of combined-arms tactics, unconventional warfare and cross-training in multiple fields of combat. In addition to being a skilled tactician and BattleMech pilot, he also flies aerospace fighters. After the Strikers' mission to Somerset, Adam plays an influential role in the Lyran Alliance and is eventually promoted to General of the Armies. When Tharkad is besieged during the Word of Blake Jihad, Adam is temporarily crowned Archon of the Lyran Alliance in order to keep the position out of enemy hands. Adam pilots AXM-2N Axman and AWS-9M Awesome 'Mechs.
- Rachel Specter – Adam's executive officer and close friend. Rachel is an expert in electronics and communication and coordinates the Striker's actions in battle.
- Katiara Kylie – Also a native of Somerset, Katiara originally washed out of Adam's training program, but managed to make her way into the team, much to Ciro's displeasure. Though not skilled with BattleMechs, she's a skilled aerospace fighter pilot. Katiara pilots a Banshee aerospace fighter and Infiltrator BattleArmor.
- Ciro Ramirez – Born to a minor but prestigious family of MechWarriors, Ciro is a skilled pilot who's very set in his ways. Ciro is captured by Clan forces early in the series, and eventually comes to accept their way of life, joining Clan Jade Falcon and fighting against his former teammates. Ciro pilots WLF-2 Wolfhound and Timber Wolf 'Mechs.
- Zachary Miles "Hawk" Hawkins – A veteran MechWarrior who works with FedCom intelligence. After capturing a Draconis Combine JumpShip for smuggling, he finds himself reassigned to it under Adam's command. Initially distrustful not only of the Combine crewmen but also of his new commanding officer, he eventually comes to respect Adam's piloting and leadership abilities. Hawk pilots an MAL-1R Mauler 'Mech. Post-series, he is mentioned as having a WLF-1 Wolfhound 'Mech in storage.
- Valten Ryder – A scoundrel of a MechWarrior, Val is hired by the Strikers on the planet of Dustball, where he worked for a local crime boss to retrieve his father's Centurion BattleMech. Val is very much out for himself, but is surprisingly loyal to his friends. Val pilots CN9-D Centurion and BSW-X1 Bushwacker 'Mechs.
- Franklin Sakamoto – Originally a smuggler for a Draconis Combine crime syndicate, Franklin overcomes his distrust of Adam to become one of the most valuable members of the Strikers, saving Prince Victor Steiner-Davion from an assassination attempt and becoming the first Inner Sphere BattleArmor trooper to destroy a Clan BattleMech. During his time with the Strikers, Franklin discovers he is the illegitimate son of Theodore Kurita, the ruler of the Combine, and gets caught up against his will in an attempted coup against Kurita by the Black Dragon syndicate. The plot fails, and Franklin renounces his claim to the Draconis throne to rejoin the Strikers. After finishing his tour of duty, Franklin returns to the Combine, where he is formally recognized by his father and joins the elite Otomo unit. During a revolt on the planet Luthien, Franklin is again captured by Black Dragon forces, and his unit vows to rescue him. Franklin pilots Sloth BattleArmor, as well as AWS-9M Awesome and HTM-27T Hatamoto-Chi 'Mechs. He has also piloted the Banshee Aerospace fighter.

=== Clan Jade Falcon ===
- Nicolai Malthus - A Star Colonel and commander of the Falcon's Claws, an elite unit of Jade Falcon warriors. He's extremely ruthless in battle and arrogant in his dealings with others, even fellow Clan warriors. Seen to be one of Galaxy Commander Chistu's most reliable soldiers early on in the series, but as Malthus's obsession with destroying Adam Steiner grows throughout the series, he begins taking increasingly rogue actions. Pilots a Summoner M Omnimech.
- Kristen Redmond - Star Colonel, commander of the Black Vision cluster and Malthus's main rival. Pilots a Mad Dog Prime Omnimech.
- Pytor - Star Commander. At the age of 37 and lacking a Bloodname, he is considered old and useless by many of the younger breed of Clan Jade Falcon warriors, including his commander, Star Colonel Nicolai Malthus. Often relegated to humiliating garrison-type duties because of this disdain. Pilots a Hunchback IIC battlemech.
- Vandervahn Chistu - Galaxy Commander. Nicolai Malthus's commander and one of the few people capable of keeping him in check, though even that's not always a sure thing. Is seen to grow increasingly frustrated with Malthus's cavalier attitude late in the series. Unlike virtually every other Clan warrior in the series, he does not have Enhanced Imaging tattoos. He is never seen piloting a battlemech or Omnimech.
- Natalya - Holds the rank of Star Commander in the Falcons Claws. She is an Elemental, one of the Clans' genetically-bred infantry. Very little is revealed about her in the series, though in the book 1st Somerset Strikers, it is revealed that she is fiercely loyal to her commander, Nicolai Malthus, because she sees his exploits as her best shot for glory and a Bloodname. Pilots an Elemental battle armor suit.

=== Clan Wolf ===
Clan Wolf only appear in the "Road to Camelot" episode, where they act as a rival to Clan Jade Falcon's claims to the Camelot base. They do not appear in any other episode.

== Episodes ==
The series consists of 13 story episodes and an additional clip-show special. The special, "No Guts, No Galaxy", recounts events from the first five episodes.

No.	Title	Original release date
1	"The Gathering Storm"	September 10, 1994
Clan Jade Falcon conquers Somerset and captures Commander Andrew Steiner. His brother, Major Adam Steiner, obtains authorization to investigate the invasion and attempt to retake the planet. Lacking transport, he commandeers a Draconis Combine spacecraft and recruits a mixed crew from traditionally hostile factions, forming the First Somerset Strikers.
2	"Well Bargained and Done"	September 17, 1994
On the planet Dustball, the Strikers attempt to recruit MechWarriors and encounter Valten Ryder, a pilot employed by local crime lord Boss Tybus. After discovering that Tybus has secretly arranged to surrender the planet to the Clans, the Strikers intervene in a battle against Clan Jade Falcon forces. Ryder subsequently joins the unit.
3	"Warriors of Light and Steel"	September 24, 1994
The Strikers conduct training exercises on Romulus, where disagreements among their pilots hinder their effectiveness. When Clan Jade Falcon attacks the planet, the unit suffers a defeat and loses control of its DropShip. During the retreat, Ciro Ramirez is captured by Clan forces, although his comrades believe him dead.
4	"Retribution"	October 1, 1994
Trapped on occupied Romulus, the Strikers cooperate with the surviving planetary militia and raid a Clan ammunition depot. Franklin Sakamoto and other crew members use holographic projections to distract the occupiers and recover their captured DropShip. The Strikers escape, but Nicolai Malthus subsequently bombards a city in retaliation for the resistance.
5	"Trade Secrets"	October 8, 1994
The Strikers infiltrate a Clan base on Twycross to obtain information about the invaders' advanced technology. Steiner, Rachel Specter and Valten Ryder steal several suits of Clan battle armour and escape. Meanwhile, the captive Ciro Ramirez learns that the Clans descend from the exiled Star League military, and Malthus attempts to persuade him to join their cause.
6	"Protect and Survive"	October 15, 1994
The Strikers encounter Victor Steiner-Davion, heir to the Federated Commonwealth, who wishes to return to the fighting after being evacuated from the front. Ordered to escort him to safety, the unit becomes involved in an assassination plot. Franklin Sakamoto, initially suspected of involvement, exposes and stops the actual assassin.
7	"In the Belly of the Beast"	October 22, 1994
On Waldorff V, the Strikers receive new BattleMechs and experimental equipment developed using captured Clan technology. Franklin Sakamoto, whose difficulties operating an armoured suit are compounded by his teammates' pranks, becomes separated from the group. When Clan officer Kristen Redmond attacks with a small force, Franklin intervenes and disables her BattleMech, enabling the Strikers to capture her.
8	"Bound by Honor"	October 29, 1994
Following another Clan attack, the Strikers learn from their prisoner Kristen Redmond that Ciro Ramirez is alive and seek to exchange her for him. However, Ciro has embraced Clan society and agrees to fight Steiner in a ritual duel. The confrontation is interrupted when explosions threaten to destroy the moon on which the combat takes place.
9	"Road to Camelot"	November 5, 1994
Investigating a mysterious signal in the Dark Nebula, several Strikers discover Camelot Command, an abandoned Star League military facility protected by automated defences. Forces from Clan Wolf and Clan Jade Falcon also arrive to claim the installation. The Strikers use its holographic systems to simulate its destruction and force the rival Clan units to withdraw.
10	"The Enemy of My Enemy"	November 12, 1994
Malthus defies his superiors and uses a fabricated message suggesting that Andrew Steiner leads a resistance movement on Apollo to lure the Strikers into an ambush. Clan forces sent to apprehend Malthus arrive during the battle, creating a confrontation between the rival Clan units. Steiner exploits their divisions and the surrounding terrain to escape.
11	"Shadow Heir"	November 26, 1994
Captain Jeroen Frestadt sabotages the Strikers' spacecraft and abducts Franklin Sakamoto, taking him to conspirators seeking to overthrow the ruler of the Draconis Combine. Franklin discovers that he is the illegitimate son of Coordinator Theodore Kurita and that the conspirators intend to install him as ruler. Following his rescue, he publicly renounces any claim to the throne.
12	"Homecoming"	December 3, 1994
The Strikers finally reach occupied Somerset and infiltrate the planet by capturing a Clan merchant vessel. They disable orbital surveillance and launch an attack on Somerset Military Academy, where prisoners are being held. Steiner frees his brother Andrew, but Malthus arrives with reinforcements and launches a counterattack.
13	"Trial of Possession"	December 10, 1994
As the battle for Somerset continues, Steiner challenges Malthus to a Trial of Possession to determine control of the planet. Their BattleMechs are disabled during the duel, which concludes in hand-to-hand combat and Malthus's defeat. The Clans withdraw as agreed, but take Somerset's inhabitants, including Andrew Steiner, as prisoners. The series ends with Steiner determined to rescue them.
Special	"No Guts, No Galaxy"	December 17, 1994
In this clip-show special, Steiner reports to the Federated Commonwealth leadership on the Strikers' encounters with the Clans and the advanced military technology recovered from Twycross. Meanwhile, Malthus must account to his superiors for the loss of the captured equipment. The episode primarily revisits events from the first five episodes.

=== Intro ===
Every episode begins with a voice over and intro sequence narrated by Adam Steiner:

"This is the Inner Sphere - thousands of planets colonized by humankind. Once it was united under the Star League, but for the last three hundred years, it has been consumed by savage wars. Until a new enemy appeared - mysterious invaders known as "The Clans". Powerful and ruthless, they struck like lightning, attacking every sector at once! But they made one big mistake - they attacked my home planet! Now, in the spirit of the Star League, ancient enemies have reunited! And we're gonna take back our galaxy!"

== Sourcebook ==
In 1995, FASA published 1st Somerset Strikers, a sourcebook companion for the animated series. The book provided background information on the BattleTech universe for viewers of the series, as well as stats and scenarios for use in the franchise's wargaming products, including BattleTech, MechWarrior, AeroTech and BattleSpace. The book also provided synopses for all 13 episodes and attempted to address the contradictions of the series with the established BattleTech canon by framing the show as a work of in-universe fiction.

== Comics ==
A 5 issue limited comicbook series called BattleTech: Fallout (based on the hit animated series) was created by Malibu Comics and released in 1994. It took place at the same time as the Clan Jade Falcon invasion, with 1st Somerset Striker's Rachel Specter's sister, heavily involved in the storyline.
