= 1990 Origins Award winners =

The following are the winners of the 17th annual (1990) Origins Award, presented at Origins 1991:

| Category | Winner | Company | Designer(s) |
|---|---|---|---|
| Best Historical Figure Series of 1990 | 25mm Ancients | Ral Partha | Dave Summers, Sandra Garrity |
| Best Fantasy or Science Fiction Figure Series of 1990 | AD&D Monsters | Ral Partha | Dennis Mize, Nick Bibby, Richard Kerr, Sandra Garrity |
| Best Vehicular Miniatures Series of 1990 | Space Ork Battle Wagon | Games Workshop/Citadel Miniatures | |
| Best Accessory Figure Series of 1990 | Castles Boxed Set | TSR | |
| Best Miniatures Rules of 1990 | Battle Tech Compendium | FASA | Sam Lewis, Jordan Weisman, L Ross Babcock |
| Best Roleplaying Rules of 1990 | King Arthur Pendragon, 3rd ed. | Chaosium | Greg Stafford |
| Best Roleplaying Adventure of 1990 | Harlequin (for Shadowrun) | FASA | Tom Dowd, Sam Lewis, Ken St Andre, John Faughnan, W G Armintrout, Jerry Epperson, Paul R Hume, Lester Smith, James D Long |
| Best Roleplaying Supplement of 1990 | Forgotten Realms Adventure Book | TSR | |
| Best Graphic Presentation of a Roleplaying Game, Adventure, or Supplement of 1990 | Ravenloft Box Set | TSR | |
| Best Graphic Presentation of a Roleplaying Game, Adventure, or Supplement of 1990 | Seattle Source Book (for Shadowrun) | FASA | |
| Best Pre-20th Century Boardgame of 1990 | Republic of Rome | The Avalon Hill Game Company | Richard Berthold, Robert Haines |
| Best Modern-Day Boardgame of 1990 | Eurorails | Mayfair Games | Darwin Bromley |
| Best Fantasy or Science Fiction Boardgame of 1990 | Genestealers | Games Workshop | |
| Best Play-by-Mail Game of 1990 | Illuminati | Flying Buffalo | Draper Kauffman |
| Best New Play-by-Mail Game of 1990 | Monster Island | Adventures By Mail | |
| Best Fantasy or Science Fiction Computer Game of 1990 | Wing Commander | Origin Systems | |
| Best Military or Strategy Computer Game of 1990 | Populous | Electronic Arts | |
| Best Professional Adventure Gaming Magazine of 1990 | Dungeon Magazine | TSR | |
| Best Amateur Adventure Gaming Magazine of 1990 | Wargamers Information | | Rick Loomis |
| Adventure Gaming Hall of Fame | Richard Berg, Sandy Petersen | | |
