= I.S.C.V.: Leander =

Science-fiction role-playing game supplement

I.S.C.V., Leander.jpg
- Cover by William H. Keith Jr.
- Designers: Jordan Weisman
- Publishers: FASA
- Publication: 1981; 44 years ago
- Genres: Science fiction
- Systems: Classic Traveller

I.S.C.V.: Leander is a 1981 role-playing game supplement for Traveller published by FASA.

== Contents ==
I.S.C.V.: Leander is a set of deck plans for a starship, an interstellar commercial vessel called the Leander.

== Publication history ==
I.S.C.V.: Leander was written by L. Ross Babcock III, and was published in 1981 by FASA as five large map sheets, a scenario sheet, and an outer folder. Leander was the third in a series of deck plans from FASA that were approved for Traveller.

== Reception ==
William A. Barton reviewed I.S.C.V.: Leander in The Space Gamer No. 41. Barton commented that "Overall, I'd hesitate to recommend the I.S.C.V.: Leander - or its sister ships - for the price. A referee who has neither the time nor the inclination to design his own ships for miniature actions might find something of use here, provided he doesn't mind the omissions. Anyone else should pass this up and design his own."

Doug Houseman reviewed I.S.P.M.V.: Fenris / S.F.V. Valkyrie, ZISMV: Vlezhdatl, I.S.C.V.: King Richard, I.S.P.M.V.: Tethys, and I.S.C.V.: Leander for Different Worlds magazine and stated that "All five ships can be readily converted to Archive's Star Rovers or FGU's Space Opera rules. SPI's Universe does not allow for easy conversion due to its pod and frame design rules. Use of all the vessels is limited to onboard only."
