= ZISMV: Vlezhdatl =

Science-fiction role-playing game supplement

- Cover by William H. Keith.
- Designers: J. Andrew Keith; Jordan Weisman; L. Ross Babcock III
- Publishers: FASA
- Publication: 1981
- Genres: Science-fiction
- Systems: Classic Traveller

ZISMV: Vlezhdatl is a science fiction tabletop role-playing game supplement, drawn and designed by Jordan Weisman, L. Ross Babcock III, with scenarios by J. Andrew Keith, and a cover by William H. Keith for Traveller, published by FASA in 1981.

== Contents ==
ZISMV: Vlezhdatl is a set of 15mm starship deckplans for the Zhodani Interstellar Military Vessel, the strike cruiser Vlezhdatl, a 2000-ton ship.

== Publication history ==
ZISMV: Vlezhdatl was written by Jordan Weisman and L. Ross Babcock III, with J. Andrew Keith, and was published in 1981 by FASA as an 8-page pamphlet with nine maps.

== Reception ==
William A. Barton reviewed ZISMV: Vlezhdatl in The Space Gamer No. 46. Barton commented that "unless you're one who prefers to draw your own plans, you should find the ZISMV: Vlezhdatl of definite use in your campaigns, particularly those taking place against the backdrop of the Fifth Frontier War."

Doug Houseman reviewed I.S.P.M.V.: Fenris / S.F.V. Valkyrie, ZISMV: Vlezhdatl, I.S.C.V.: King Richard, I.S.P.M.V.: Tethys, and I.S.C.V.: Leander for Different Worlds magazine and stated that "All five ships can be readily converted to Archive's Star Rovers or FGU's Space Opera rules. SPI's Universe does not allow for easy conversion due to its pod and frame design rules. Use of all the vessels is limited to onboard only."
