= Tales of the Black Widow Company =

Game supplement

Tales of the Black Widow Company is a game supplement for BattleTech published by FASA in 1985.

== Contents ==
Tales of the Black Widow Company is a supplement describing the mercenary company known as The Black Widow Company of the mercenary unit Wolf's Dragoons. Tales of the Black Widow Company details the history, organization, individual mechwarriors and BattleMechs of Natasha Kerensky and her mercenary unit; it also includes 12 short scenarios.

== Publication history ==
Tales of the Black Widow Company was written by Jordan Weisman, L. Ross Babcock III, Patrick Larkin, Richard Meyer, J. Andrew Keith, and William H. Keith, Jr., with a cover by Jim Holloway, and was published by FASA in 1985 as a 48-page book.

Shannon Appelcline stated that FASA was "looking into how to market Battletech more like an RPG, with more constant releases than a normal wargame could support" and that "This new strategy started off with saddle-stitched books of wargaming scenarios such as Tales of the Black Widow's Company (1985) and The Fox's Teeth (1985)."

== Reception ==
Stephan Wieck reviewed Tales of the Black Widow Company in White Wolf #7 (1987), rating it a 7 out of 10 and stated that "Useless if you prefer to play your own unit instead of playing the Widow's company. Good background for posible opponents to players. Excellent if you only own Battletech."

== Reviews ==
- Comics Feature #45
- G.M. The Independent Fantasy Roleplaying Magazine #2
