= 1995 Origins Award winners =

The following are the winners of the 22nd annual (1995) Origins Award, presented at Origins 1996:

Category	Winner	Company	Designer(s)
Best Historical Figure Series of 1995	Celts 25mm	Mirilton	
Best Fantasy or Science Fiction Figure Series of 1995	Star Wars	West End Games	
Best Vehicular Series of 1995	BattleTech: Vehicles & 'Mechs	Ral Partha Enterprises	Sculptors: C. Atkin, R. Kyde, J. Johnson, D. Summers, J. Wilhelm
Best Miniatures Accessory Series of 1995	American Civil War Buildings 15mm	Stone Mountain Miniatures	Sculptor: Kris Marquardt
Best Miniatures Rules of 1995	Warzone	Heartbreaker Hobbies & Games	Designer: Bill King
Best Game Accessory of 1995	BattleTech Tech Readout 3058 (Battletech) (tie)	FASA Corp.	Designers: Hugh Brown, Chris Hartford, Sam Lewis, Bryan Nystul
Best Game Accessory of 1995	Mage: The Ascension Tarot Deck (Mage: The Ascension) (tie)	White Wolf Game Studio	Designers: Jackie Cassada, Nicky Rea
Best Roleplaying Rules of 1995	Mage: The Ascension 2nd Edition	White Wolf Game Studio	Designer: Phil Brucato, Stewart Wieck
Best Roleplaying Adventure of 1995	Giovanni Chronicle: The Last Supper (Vampire)	White Wolf Game Studio	Designer: Daniel Greenberg
Best Roleplaying Supplement of 1995	Birthright (Advanced Dungeons & Dragons)	TSR Inc.	Designer: Slade Hansen, Rich Baker, Colin McComb
Best Graphic Presentation of a Roleplaying Game, Adventure, or Supplement of 1995	Bug City (Shadowrun)	FASA Corp.	Art Director: Jim Nelson
Best Pre-20th Century Board Game of 1995	Colonial Diplomacy (tie)	The Avalon Hill Game Company	Designer: Dr. Peter Hawes
Best Pre-20th Century Board Game of 1995	Three Days of Gettysburg (tie)	GMT Games	Designer: Richard Berg
Best Modern-Day Board Game of 1995	Empire of the Rising Sun	The Avalon Hill Game Company	Designer: Bruce Harper
Best Fantasy or Science Fiction Board Game of 1995	Dragon Dice	TSR Inc.	Designer: Lester Smith
Best Graphic Presentation of a Board Game of 1995	Armed and Dangerous RoboRally	Wizards of the Coast	Designer: Richard Garfield
Best Card Game of 1995	Middle-earth: The Wizards	Iron Crown Enterprises	Designer: Coleman Charlton
Best New Play-by-Mail Game of 1995	Swords of Pelarn, Legends 2	Midnight Games	
Best Play-by-Mail Game of 1995	Illuminati Play by Mail (tie)	Flying Buffalo, Inc.	Designer: Draper Kauffman
Best Play-by-Mail Game of 1995	Middle-earth Play-by-Mail (tie)	Game Systems Inc.	Designers: Bill Feild & Peter Stassun
Best Fantasy or Science Fiction Computer Game of 1995	MechWarrior II	Activision	Designers: Tom Doud & Sean Vesce - Production Director: John Spinale - Producer: Josh Resnick
Best Military or Strategy Computer Game of 1995	Panzer General	Strategic Simulations, Inc.	
Best Game-Related Fiction of 1995	Tactics of Duty (BattleTech)	FASA Corp.	Author: Willam H. Keith
Best Professional Gaming Magazine of 1995	Shadis Magazine	Alderac Entertainment Group	Editor: D. J. Trindle
Best Amateur Gaming Magazine of 1995	Berg's Review of Games		Editor: Richard Berg
Adventure Gaming Hall of Fame	Axis & Allies	Nova Games, Milton Bradley	Designer: Lawrence Harris - Design Support: Joseph Angiolillo & Al Leonardi
Adventure Gaming Hall of Fame	Call of Cthulhu	Chaosium	Designers: Sandy Petersen & Lynn Willis, Liz Danforth
Special Achievement Awards	Encyclopedia Cthulhiana	Chaosium	Author: Daniel Harms
Special Achievement Awards	Supermarina I (Command At Sea)	Clash of Arms Games	Designers: Gresham & Markawitz
