= House Marik: The Free Worlds League =

1988 tabletop game supplement

House Marik: The Free Worlds League is a 1988 tabletop game supplement published by FASA for BattleTech.

== Contents ==
House Marik: The Free Worlds League is a supplement in which a detailed sourcebook on the Free Worlds League covers its history, political structure, religion, military, culture, economy, notable personalities, and member worlds, including a brief planetary atlas.

== Publication history ==
House Marik, The Free Worlds League was written by Adventure Architects (Richard K. Meyer, Walter H. Hunt) and C. R. Green, with art by Dana Knutson, Jeff Laubenstein, and Todd F. Marsh and published by FASA in 1988 as a 168-page book with two foldout maps. The book was also published by Jedko Games of Australia in 1988.

== Reviews ==
- GM #2
