= CityTech =

1986 board game

- Front cover of CityTech, 2nd edition
- Designers: Jordan Weisman; L. Ross Babcock III; Forest Brown
- Publishers: FASA Corporation
- Years active: 1986 to 2001
- Players: 2+
- Setup time: 5 - 30 minutes
- Playing time: No exact time
- Chance: Dice rolling
- Age range: 12+
- Skills: Tactical, Arithmetic
- Website: https://www.battletech.com/

CityTech is a FASA wargame first published in 1986 and set in the BattleTech fictional universe.

== Gameplay ==
CityTech provided additional rules for simulating combat with infantry and vehicles rather than just BattleMechs, which were the focus of the original game.

== Publication history ==
CityTech was the first official expansion to the BattleTech board game.

FASA published a second edition in 1994.

== Reception ==
Scott Tanner reviewed CityTech in Space Gamer/Fantasy Gamer No. 78. Tanner commented that "It is in City Tech that infantry come into their full potential. Standing around in open country and getting slaughtered seems to be the poor infantryman's lot until City Tech came out."

Stephan Wieck reviewed Citytech in White Wolf #7 (1987), rating it an 8 out of 10 and stated that "The interior art of Citytech is rather poor, but the cover art done by Jim Holloway is very good. And, the counters and maps are of very high quality."

Ashley Watkins reviewed BattleTech for Adventurer magazine and stated that "get Citytech for the combat rules, Battletech you want to design your own mechs, Aerotech only if you want the variable geometry mechs, or want to play the space game."

Dale L. Kemper reviewed CityTech for Different Worlds magazine and stated that "Citytech is certainly a good game to complement Battletech. It expands the possible scenarios that can be played and offers a number of additional rules to keep things interesting. Once again, however, no introductory scenarios are provided so players will have to come up with their own or buy the scenario supplements mentioned above."

Robert DeVoe reviewed CityTech 2nd edition in White Wolf Inphobia #57 (July, 1995), rating it a 3 out of 5 and stated that "While not necessary to play BattleTech, CityTech adds an interesting element to combat, and can present advanced tactical challenges."

== Reviews ==
- Shadis #20 (July 1995)
- Casus Belli #94
- G.M. The Independent Fantasy Roleplaying Magazine #2
