= House Liao: The Capellan Confederation =

1988 tabletop game supplement

House Liao: The Capellan Confederation is a 1988 tabletop game supplement published by FASA for BattleTech.

== Contents ==
House Liao: The Capellan Confederation is a supplement in which a comprehensive sourcebook on House Liao and the Capellan Confederation details its history, government, society, religion, economy, military, culture, notable figures, and member worlds, including a concise planetary atlas.

== Publication history ==
House Liao, The Capellan Confederation was written by Rick David Stuart, with art by Dana Knutson, Todd F. Marsh, and Jeff Laubenstein and published by FASA in 1988 as a 160-page book with two foldout maps. The book was also published by Jedko Games of Australia in 1988.

== Reviews ==
- GM #2
