= I.S.C.V.: King Richard =

1981 Science-fiction role-playing game supplement

A Luxury Liner of the First Class
- Cover by William H. Keith Jr.
- Designers: Jordan Weisman
- Publishers: FASA
- Publication: 1981; 44 years ago
- Genres: Science fiction
- Systems: Classic Traveller

I.S.C.V.: King Richard is a 1981 role-playing game supplement for Traveller published by FASA.

== Contents ==
I.S.C.V.: King Richard is a set of starship deck plans, a 5000-ton first class luxury liner.

== Publication history ==
I.S.C.V.: King Richard was written by Jordan Weisman, with art by William H. Keith Jr., and was published in 1981 by FASA as an 8-page pamphlet with 21 large map sheets.

== Reception ==
William A. Barton reviewed I.S.C.V.: King Richard in The Space Gamer No. 42. Barton commented that "Although the quality of their earlier products made me hesitant to try this one out, in I.S.C.V. King Richard, FASA has pretty much redeemed themselves. You should find the King Richard an interesting addition to your campaign."

Doug Houseman reviewed I.S.P.M.V.: Fenris / S.F.V. Valkyrie, ZISMV: Vlezhdatl, I.S.C.V.: King Richard, I.S.P.M.V.: Tethys, and I.S.C.V.: Leander for Different Worlds magazine and stated that "All five ships can be readily converted to Archive's Star Rovers or FGU's Space Opera rules. SPI's Universe does not allow for easy conversion due to its pod and frame design rules. Use of all the vessels is limited to onboard only."

== See also ==
- Action Aboard: Adventures on the King Richard - an adventure supplement for use with this product
- List of Traveller books
