= The Fox's Teeth: Exploits of McKinnon's Raiders =

The Fox's Teeth: Exploits of McKinnon's Raiders is a 1986 game supplement published by FASA for BattleTech.

== Contents ==
The Fox's Teeth: Exploits of McKinnon's Raiders is a supplement in which House Davion is briefly described and its elite BattleMech unit, McKinnon's Raiders, and includes 12 short scenarios.

== Publication history ==
The Fox's Teeth, Exploits of McKinnon's Raiders was written by Jordan Weisman, William H. Keith, Jr., et al., with a cover by Jim Holloway and published by FASA in 1986 as a 48-page book. The Fox's Teeth was also published by Jedko Games in Australia in 1987.

Shannon Appelcline stated that FASA was "looking into how to market Battletech more like an RPG, with more constant releases than a normal wargame could support" and that "This new strategy started off with saddle-stitched books of wargaming scenarios such as Tales of the Black Widow's Company (1985) and The Fox's Teeth (1985)."

== Reviews ==
- Comics Feature #45
- G.M. The Independent Fantasy Roleplaying Magazine #2
