= House Steiner: The Lyran Commonwealth =

1987 tabletop game supplement

House Steiner: The Lyran Commonwealth is a 1987 tabletop game supplement published by FASA for BattleTech.

== Contents ==
House Steiner: The Lyran Commonwealth is a supplement in which a detailed sourcebook on the Lyran Commonwealth covers its history, politics, society, religion, culture, economy, military forces, and member worlds, including an atlas with descriptions of each Commonwealth world.

== Publication history ==
House Steiner, The Lyran Commonwealth was written by Boy F. Peterson, Jr. with art by Dana Knutson, Jim Holloway, Todd F. Marsh, and Jeff Laubenstein and published by FASA in 1987 as a 176-page book with two foldout maps. The book was also published by Jedko Games of Australia in 1988.

== Reviews ==
- GM #2
- StarDrive (Volume 1, Issue 1 - Jan 1988)
