= Dropships and Jumpships =

1988 tabletop game supplement

Dropships and Jumpships is a 1988 tabletop game supplement published by FASA for BattleTech.

== Contents ==
Dropships and Jumpships is a supplement in which a supplement on space travel and spacecraft features rules for spacecraft design and operations, descriptions and statistics for JumpShips, DropShips, small craft, and space stations, plus guidelines for zero-gravity equipment and skills.

== Publication history ==
Dropships and Jumpships was written by Clare W. Hess with a cover by Steve Venters and published by FASA in 1988 as a 144-page book. The book was also published by Jedko Games of Australia in 1988.

== Reviews ==
- GM #2
