= House Kurita: The Draconis Combine =

1987 tabletop game supplement

House Kurita: The Draconis Combine is a 1987 tabletop game supplement published by FASA for BattleTech.

== Contents ==
House Kurita: The Draconis Combine is a supplement in which a detailed sourcebook on House Kurita and the Draconis Combine, covering its extensive history, government, society, economy, religion, military organization, notable personalities, and major worlds, including a brief planetary atlas.

== Publication history ==
House Kurita, The Draconis Combine was written by Boy F. Peterson, Jr., Tara Gallagher, Todd Huettel, Donna Ippolito, John A. Theisen, and Robert Wells and published by FASA in 1987 as a 192-page book with two foldout maps. The book was also published by Jedko Games of Australia in 1988.

== Reviews ==
- GM #2
