= Mercenary's Handbook =

1987 tabletop game supplement

Mercenary's Handbook is a 1987 tabletop game supplement published by FASA for BattleTech.

== Contents ==
Mercenary's Handbook is a supplement in which a supplement on mercenary unit creation and management covers their history, economics, and operational practices, while providing detailed profiles of three mercenary commands and extensive interior artwork.

== Publication history ==
Mercenary's Handbook was written by J. Andrew Keith, Boy F. Peterson, Jr., Dale Kemper, and Anthony Pryor with art by Jim Holloway, Todd F. Marsh, Dana Knutson, and Jeff Laubenstein and published by FASA in 1987 as a 104-page book.

== Reviews ==
- GM #2
- Gateways
- Stardate (Volume 3, Issue 2 - Mar 1987)
