= Technical Readout: 3026 (Vehicles and Personal Equipment) =

1987 tabletop game supplement

Technical Readout: 3026 (Vehicles and Personal Equipment) is a 1987 tabletop game supplement published by FASA for BattleTech.

== Contents ==
Technical Readout: 3026 (Vehicles and Personal Equipment) is a supplement in which vehicles and personal equipment are detailed, featuring illustrated descriptions and game statistics for a wide variety of military vehicles, exoskeletons, communications gear, and personal and support weapons.

== Publication history ==
Technical Readout: 3026 (Vehicles and Personal Equipment) was written by Kevin Stein and Sam Lewis, with art by Duane Loose and Steve Venters and published by FASA in 1987 as a 128-page book. The book was also published by Jedko Games of Australia in 1988.

Shannon Appelcline explained in his book Designers & Dragons how with expanding the BattleTech line, "Taking another page out of Traveller's book, FASA also moved toward a metaplot for Battletech. At first this was just reflected in yearly updates: the Battletech Technical Readout: 3025 (1986) was soon replaced by the Battletech Technical Readout: 3026 (1987)."

== Reviews ==
- GM #2
- Casus Belli (Issue 43 - Feb 1988)
