= The Fourth Succession War Military Atlas Volume 1 =

1988 supplement for BattleTech war-game

Cover art by Jim Holloway

The Fourth Succession War Military Atlas Volume 1 is a game supplement for BattleTech published by FASA in 1988.

== Contents ==
The Fourth Succession War Military Atlas Volume 1 is a Battle Tech supplement that details the Fourth War of Succession, which began in August 3028 after the Prince of the Federated Suns, Hanse Davion, gave his newlywed wife Melissa Steiner of the Lyran Commonwealth the Capellan Confederation as a wedding gift.

== Publication history ==
FASA published BattleTech, a blend of wargame and role-playing game, in 1984, and published many supplements for it that followed a long meta-story arc. One of these supplements was The Fourth Succession War Military Atlas Volume 1, designed by Sam Lewis, James Long, Michael Lee, Blaine Pardoe and Boy Petersen, with illustrations by Roger Loveless and John Marcus, and cover art by Jim Holloway. It was released by FASA in 1988.

FASA published Volume 2 of this set the following year.

== Reception ==
In Issue 6 of the British game magazine Games International, Jake Thornton expressed disappointment in this product, saying, "Sadly the whole book smacks of being written to a rather unimaginative formula. Unless you really don't have the time, or you simply must have everything FASA produce, I wouldn't recommend you buy it." Thornton concluded by giving this book a very poor rating of only 1 out of 5 for role-playing gamers, and 3 out of 5 for wargamers, and stated that

In Issue 51 of the French games magazine Casus Belli, Pierre Lejoyeux noted that "Each battle is presented and analyzed with many color shots and with the same rigor and seriousness that would be appropriate for a 'professional' on the Second World War."
