= 1986 Origins Award winners =

Gaming award winners

The following are the winners of the 13th annual (1986) Origins Award, presented at Origins 1987:

== Charles Roberts Awards ==
| Category | Winner | Company | Designer(s) |
|---|---|---|---|
| Best Pre-20th Century Game of 1986 | Chickamauga | West End Games | |
| Best 20th Century Game of 1986 | Fortress America | Milton Bradley | |
| Best Fantasy or Science Fiction Game of 1986 | Kings & Things | West End Games | |
| Best Professional Boardgaming Magazine of 1986 | The Wargamer | World Wide Wargaming | |
| Best Military or Strategy Computer Game of 1986 | Gettysburg, the Turning Point | Strategic Simulations Inc | |
| Best Amateur Adventure Gaming Magazine of 1986 | The Midwest Wargamers Association Newsletter | Hal Thingium | |
| Best Graphic Presentation of 1986 | Korean War | Victory Games | |
| Adventure Gaming Hall of Fame | Lou Zocchi | | |

== The H.G. Wells Awards ==
| Category | Winner | Company | Designer(s) |
|---|---|---|---|
| Best Historical Figure Series of 1986 | American Civil War Line | Stone Mountain Miniatures | J.McCarron, D. Babb |
| Best Fantasy or Science Fiction Figure Series of 1986 | Fantasy Lords Line | Grenadier Models | |
| Best Vehicular/Accessory Series of 1986 | Battle Tech Mech | Ral Partha | |
| Best Miniatures Rules of 1986 | Command Decision | GDW | |
| Best Roleplaying Rules of 1986 | Ghostbusters | West End Games | |
| Best Roleplaying Adventure of 1986 | Going Home (for Twilight 2000) | GDW | |
| Best Roleplaying Supplement of 1986 | BattleTech Technical Readout (for BattleTech) | FASA | |
| Best Roleplaying Supplement of 1986 | Cthulhu by Gaslight (for Call of Cthulhu) | Chaosium | |
| Best Professional Roleplaying Magazine of 1986 | The Dragon | TSR | |
| Best Professional Miniatures Magazine of 1986 | The Courier | Courier Publishing | |
| Best Play-by-Mail Game of 1986 | It's a Crime | Adventures By Mail | |
| Best Fantasy or Science Fiction Computer Game of 1986 | Bard's Tale II | Electronic Arts | |
| Best Screen Graphics in a Home Computer Game of 1986 | Gunship | Microprose | |
