= Behind Enemy Lines (role-playing game) =

WWII tabletop role-playing game

Behind Enemy Lines is a military role-playing game published by FASA in 1982 that is set during World War II; it was the first role-playing game of this genre.

== Description ==
Behind Enemy Lines was the first role-playing game set in World War II,Behind Enemy Lines was the first role-playing game set in the 1940s. a military system covering U.S. soldiers on the Western Front. Skill and combat rules are fairly simple, as they are descended from the original Traveller systems.

In the first edition, the "Character Generation and Basic Rules" book (96 pages) covers character creation, combat, maps, interrogation, and special units. The "Event Tables" book (48 pages) is full of randomized tables for covering almost any kind of situation: encounters in woods, towns, and fortifications; on railroads; for parachuting and mountain climbing; etc. The "Missions" book (56 pages) has three scenarios, four miniscenarios, and numerous "pregenerated" NPCs. In the second edition, all this material is reorganized into a "Soldier's Handbook" (32 pages), a "Commander's Manual" (32 pages), an "Operations Book" (16 pages), and an Infantry Reference Data sheet.

== Publication history ==
Behind Enemy Lines was designed by William H. Keith Jr., with Jordan Weisman, Ross Babcock, Eric Turn, and Steve Turn, with artwork by James Clouse, William H. Keith Jr., and Jerry O'Malley. The boxed set was published in 1982 by FASA and included a 96-page book, a 56-page book, and a 48-page book, a map booklet, four cardstock sheets, two cardboard counter sheets, and dice. FASA also published the supplement British Commandos (1982) and the adventure The Guns of Navarone (1982).

The second edition was published by The Companions in 1985 as a boxed set including two 32-page books, and a 16-page book, a cardstock screen, and dice. The Companions also published the adventure ... Until Relieved (1985) and the supplement The British in World War II (1986).

== Reception ==
Ian R. Beste reviewed Behind Enemy Lines for Different Worlds magazine and stated that "The best use players and gamemasters can make of BEL is as a game of special operations. A campaign game of BEL with the players a bunch of infantrymen will become boring. Set it up so that the players get to try different characters and different situations each game session."

Dale L. Kemper reviewed Behind Enemy Lines for Different Worlds magazine and stated that "Overall, Behind Enemy Lines is a good simulation of World War II infantry combat in the European theater. For those who are interested in this subject BEL will be well worth the effort of reading the rules and familiarizing yourself with the system. There was talk of further supplements to this game when FASA was publishing it (such as a Guns Of Navarone adventure, British commando rules, North Africa, 1942, etc.) but whether the Companions intends to support the reissue or not is unknown. Hopefully, they will. And it will be a good indication of the gaming public's acceptance of this game if we see some interesting supplements come out over the next few months."

In his 1990 book The Complete Guide to Role-Playing Games, game critic Rick Swan found "The game mechanics are adequate but bland ... while large combat encounters bog down in a swamp of formulas, tables, and modifiers, they're reasonably exciting if not exactly realistic." Swan found the 8-year-old game had been superseded by superior products such as Phoenix Command and Merc, and concluded by giving the game a poor rating of only 1.5 out of 4, saying, "Neither good history nor interesing fantasy, Behind Enemy Lines is best forgotten."

== Awards ==
The first edition set of Behind Enemy Lines won an H.G. Wells Award for "Best Roleplaying Rules of 1982".

== Reviews ==
- Casus Belli #15 (June 1983)
- Analog Science Fiction and Fact
