= BattleSpace =

1993 wargame

- Designers: Chris Hartford
- Publishers: FASA Corporation, Descartes Editeur, Fanpro
- Publication: 1993
- Players: 2–6
- Playing time: 360 minutes

BattleSpace is a science fiction wargame published by FASA Corporation in 1993. Set in the BattleTech universe, it simulates naval warfare in space.

== Description ==
FASA had launched the BattleTech franchise in 1984. This game, released in 1993, was designed by Chris Hartford, with additional material by L. Ross Babcock III, Sam Lewis, Jordan Weisman, and Clare Hess, and cover art by Peter Scanlon and Mike Neilsen.

== Gameplay ==
=== Components ===
The boxed set includes:

- 152-page rulebook
- 16-page record sheet book
- two 34" x 22" mapsheets
- four sheets of counters
- 32 plastic bases
- two 6-sided dice

=== Movement ===
Players deploy their counters, representing spaceships, on the map. Movement is done by spending Thrust Points; there are guidelines for determining heading and velocity.

=== Combat ===
To attack another ship, the active player readies a weapon (autocannon, pulse laser or point-defense weapon), and determines the distance to the target. Success or failure is determined by a roll of two dice. If the sum exceeds the target's to-hit number (which varies with range), then the attack succeeds. Damage that is not absorbed by ship armor then is distributed among the target ship's systems.

== Reception ==
In the March 1994 edition of Dragon (Issue 203), Rick Swan thought the basic rules produced a good game, but "the advanced rules go overboard with complications; space/atmosphere interface penalties require too many calculations, and enemy vessel boardings are too much work." Swan concluded that although FASA recommended players also buy the BattleTech Compendium and MechWarrior role-playing game, he thought that this game worked fine just on its own: "Those who just want to zap spaceships with laser guns don't need the other supplements ... The BattleSpace set contains all the hallmarks of a classic board game; it's easy to learn, difficult to master, and maddeningly addictive. There are few pleasures as satisfying as blowing an Inner Sphere dropship to smithereens."

In the February 1994 edition of Pyramid (issue 5), Scott Haring thought that this game was the best bet for gamers seeking less complexity, saying, "if you wanted to expand your BattleTech horizons to include great naval battles in space, but didn't want to get bogged down in the intricate detail of AeroTech, then BattleSpace is for you. It's got all the epic action you want, but won't take you all night to play."

== Reviews ==
- Casus Belli #85
