= I.S.P.M.V.: Tethys =

Science-fiction role-playing game supplement

- Cover by William H. Keith Jr.
- Designers: Jordan Weisman
- Publishers: FASA
- Publication: 1981; 44 years ago
- Genres: Science fiction
- Systems: Classic Traveller

I.S.P.M.V.: Tethys is a role-playing game supplement for Traveller published by FASA vin 1980.

== Contents ==
I.S.P.M.V.: Tethys is a set of deck plans for the Tethys, a 1000-ton "Interstellar Para-Military" Q-ship that carries six pinnaces and a squadron of troopers. The supplement is based on the spaceship creation rules originally published in Traveller Book 5: High Guard.

In addition to the rulebook, the supplement includes seven pages of 8" x 16" blueprints in 15 mm scale for the Tethys, and a sheet of additional descriptions.

== Publication history ==
I.S.P.M.V.: Tethys was written by Jordan Weisman and was published in 1981 by FASA as a pamphlet, and seven 11" x 17" map sheets.

== Reception ==
In the June 1981 edition of The Space Gamer (Issue No. 40), Richard A. Edwards found the supplement lacking. "Tethys seems incomplete. Perhaps, with a lot of work, it could be usable for miniature play or to provide a platform for a shoot-out in space. You'd probably be better off saving up for Azhanti High Lightning."

In the July 1981 edition of Dragon (Issue #51), Tony Watson also questioned the value of the supplement for referees who enjoyed creating their own work: "If the referee is conversant in constructing vessels that the players enjoy and has a sufficiency of such ships, then he probably should not buy these playing aids. But if for any reason he finds new ships attractive, these are good candidates."

Doug Houseman reviewed I.S.P.M.V.: Fenris / S.F.V. Valkyrie, ZISMV: Vlezhdatl, I.S.C.V.: King Richard, I.S.P.M.V.: Tethys, and I.S.C.V.: Leander for Different Worlds magazine and stated that "All five ships can be readily converted to Archive's Star Rovers or FGU's Space Opera rules. SPI's Universe does not allow for easy conversion due to its pod and frame design rules. Use of all the vessels is limited to onboard only."
