= British Commandos (Behind Enemy Lines) =

British Commandos is a 1982 role-playing game supplement published by FASA for Behind Enemy Lines.

== Contents ==
British Commandos is a supplement in which British Commando characters are detailed, including their creation, training, specialized skills, and small‑boat operations, culminating in a raid scenario.

== Publication history ==
British Commandos was written by Sam Lewis with art by Mitch O'Connell and published by FASA in 1982 as a 48-page book. It is subtitled "Book 4", as the main boxed set contained three books.

== Reviews ==
- Netherworld Continuum (Issue 6 - Apr/May 1983)
