= Action Aboard: Adventures on the King Richard =

1981 Science-fiction role-playing game supplement

Action Aboard
Adventures on the King Richard
- Cover by William H. Keith.
- Designers: Bill Paley
- Publishers: FASA
- Publication: 1981; 44 years ago
- Genres: Science-fiction
- Systems: Classic Traveller

Action Aboard: Adventures on the King Richard is a 1981 role-playing game adventure for Classic Traveller, written by Bill Paley, with a cover by William H. Keith, and published by FASA.

== Plot summary ==
Action Aboard: Adventures on the King Richard is a supplement presenting character descriptions and game statistics, with adventure ideas and outlines so that gamemasters can devise scenarios for player characters to be used aboard the 5000-ton King Richard luxury liner.

== Publication history ==
Action Aboard: Adventures on the King Richard was written by Bill Paley, with art by Kevin Siembieda, and was published in 1981 by FASA as a digest-sized 48-page book with a two-color map.

== Reception ==
William A. Barton reviewed Action Aboard: Adventures on the King Richard in The Space Gamer No. 47. Barton commented that "Overall, Action Aboard is quite well done and should provide many hours of adventure for Traveller players who can appreciate several different types of scenarios."

Doug Houseman reviewed Action Aboard for Different Worlds magazine and stated that "Action Aboard is by far the best new adventure for Traveller available to the GM. Other FASA adventures offer almost as much to the GM, but this adventure offers so many possibilities that one can apply not only to the Traveller system but to almost any other science-fiction role-playing system on the market."

Bob McWilliams reviewed Action Aboard for White Dwarf #31, giving it an overall rating of 5 out of 10 for the novice, and 6 for the expert, and stated that "Well produced and with plenty going on, the designers have provided referees with as much help as can be fitted in booklets of this size, gone into detail at points in the adventure where it's necessary and not filled out with 'chrome'."

== Reviews ==
- Polyhedron #75

== See also ==
- I.S.C.V.: King Richard - Deck plans for use with this product
- List of Traveller books
