= BattleTech supplements =

Over the decades, a number of supplements have been published for BattleTech, a wargaming and military science fiction franchise launched by FASA Corporation in 1984, acquired by WizKids in 2001, which was in turn acquired by Topps in 2003; and published since 2007 by Catalyst Game Labs. The trademark is currently owned by Topps and, for video games, Microsoft Gaming; Catalyst Game Studios licenses the franchise from Topps.

== BattleTech: Map Set 1 ==
BattleTech: Map Set 1 is a pack of four maps on cardstock which contained maps identified as: "Open Terrain", "River Valley", "Lake Area" and "City/Industrial Complex". It was published by FASA in 1985.

=== Reception ===
Stephan Wieck reviewed BattleTech Map Set in White Wolf #7 (1987), rating it a 9 out of 10 and stated that "Wonderful to have."

== Tales of the Black Widow Company ==
Tales of the Black Widow Company was published by FASA in 1985 as a 48-page book. It described the mercenary company known as The Black Widow Company of the mercenary unit Wolf's Dragoons. Tales of the Black Widow Company details the history, organization, individual mechwarriors and BattleMechs of Natasha Kerensky and her mercenary unit; it also includes 12 short scenarios. It was written by Jordan Weisman, L. Ross Babcock III, Patrick Larkin, Richard Meyer, J. Andrew Keith, and William H. Keith Jr., with a cover by Jim Holloway.

Shannon Appelcline stated that FASA was "looking into how to market Battletech more like an RPG, with more constant releases than a normal wargame could support" and that "This new strategy started off with saddle-stitched books of wargaming scenarios such as Tales of the Black Widow's Company (1985) and The Fox's Teeth (1985)."

=== Reception ===
Stephan Wieck reviewed Tales of the Black Widow Company in White Wolf #7 (1987), rating it a 7 out of 10 and stated that "Useless if you prefer to play your own unit instead of playing the Widow's company. Good background for posible opponents to players. Excellent if you only own Battletech."

=== House Sourcebooks ===
The original House sourcebooks, published by FASA between 1987 and 1988, provided comprehensive overviews of the five major Successor States of the Inner Sphere. Each book delved into the respective House's history, political landscape, military organization, and cultural nuances during the Succession Wars era.

- House Kurita (The Draconis Combine) – published in 1987 (Product Code: 1620, ISBN 1555600395)
- House Steiner (The Lyran Commonwealth) – published in 1987 (Product Code: 1621, ISBN 1555600336)
- House Marik (The Free Worlds League) – published in 1988 (Product Code: 1622, ISBN 1555600344)
- House Davion (The Federated Suns) – published in 1988 (Product Code: 1623, ISBN 1555600352)
- House Liao (The Capellan Confederation) – published in 1987 (Product Code: 1624, ISBN 1555600360)

These sourcebooks remain fan favorites for their detailed world-building and serve as essential references for players and enthusiasts of the BattleTech universe.

== BattleTech: Hot Spots ==
BattleTech: Hot Spots was published in 1993 by FASA. It presents 64 missions in a two-volume set.

=== Reception ===
Robert DeVoe reviewed BattleTech: Hot Spots in White Wolf #46 (Aug., 1994), rating it a 4 out of 5 and stated that "you get outlines for 64 missions and several new tools, making your job a little easier. I recommend this set for any BattleTech campaign."

=== Reviews ===
- Australian Realms #16

== BattleTech: Luthien ==
BattleTech: Luthien is a 1993 supplement in which 18 scenarios are presented, depicting an invasion by the Clan on the capital of the Dragonis Combine.

Robert DeVoe reviewed BattleTech: Luthien in White Wolf Inphobia #51 (Jan., 1995), rating it a 3 out of 5 and stated that "Though limited in flexibility, Luthien provides the opportunity to compare your skills to those of 'historic' commanders. Twelve dollars is a pretty good investment for 18 games."

== The Periphery ==
The Periphery is a 1995 role-playing game supplement for BattleTech and MechWarrior published by FASA. It details the Periphery worlds at the end of the Inner Sphere, with one section for each of the five largest powers on the periphery.

=== Reception ===
James Swallow reviewed The Periphery for Arcane magazine, rating it an 8 out of 10 overall. Swallow comments that "The Periphery is a sourcebook for the referee who wants to get on with it alone, and the rich setting is perfect for a Frontier, Mercenary or Pirate campaign. There's ample room for budding warlords to carve out their own republics through force of arms, engage in politics or just pound the lubricant out of each other's mechs. Definitely worth a look by any BattleTech gamers seeking fresh pastures."

== Technical Readout: 3058 ==
Technical Readout: 3058 was published by FASA in 1995; It details conventional combat forces, updated versions of previously presented vehicles, and new Inner Sphere BattleMechs.

=== Reception ===
Alex Bund reviewed it for Arcane magazine, rating it a 7 out of 10 overall. Bund comments that "Like previous Technical Readouts, the 3058 edition is an essential sourcebook for both players and referees of Battle Tech or Mechwarrior."

BattleTech Tech Readout 3058 won in a tie for the Origins Awards for Best Game Accessory of 1995.
