= The Guns of Navarone (Behind Enemy Lines) =

The Guns of Navarone is a 1982 role-playing game adventure published by FASA for Behind Enemy Lines.

== Plot summary ==
The Guns of Navarone is an adventure in which the player characters infiltrate a Nazi‑occupied Greek island to destroy an entrenched artillery position, featuring mountain‑climbing rules and new weapons.

== Publication history ==
The Guns of Navarone was written by William H. Keith Jr. with art by Mitch O'Connell and published by FASA in 1982 as a 48-page book.

Shannon Appelcline noted how the for the company that its "second RPG line began with a new roleplaying game called Behind Enemy Lines (1982), a William H. Keith Jr. design. It was a military RPG set in World War II, and was not only one of the earlier military RPGs, but also the first set in the 1940s. The idea was to support it with a line of licensed supplements, beginning with The Guns of Navarone (1982). Unfortunately, it didn't find the success of major military RPGs like GDW's Twilight: 2000 (1984) and Leading Edge Games' Phoenix Command (1986), so additional supplements planned for "The Dirty Dozen" and "Hogan's Heroes" never appeared."

== Reviews ==
- The Complete Guide to Role-Playing Games
