= Billycart Kids =

- Founded: 2004; 22 years ago
- Headquarters: Adelaide, Australia
- Key people: Andy Rice, Chief Big Kid
- Products: Billycarts
- Website: www.billycartkids.com

Billycart Kids is an Australian company which makes and distribute billycarts.

== Etymology ==
The term "billycart" originates from the Australian billygoat-pulled cart of the 1880s. Originally, a simple platform with four wheels and a moveable front steering column, the billycart was adapted to become a self-powered vehicle which children would race; the challenge being, to travel as fast and/or far as possible with the least initial momentum.

== Construction ==
Using timber from Australian renewable forests, this current model billycart has four wheels, a fixed rear axle and a steerable front beam axle, actuated by a hand held rope. The seat area is enclosed; designed for both safety and aesthetics.

Unpowered, the billycart is designed to be pushed by a friend or run down a suitable slope. Users of this particular model claim Linear Park in Adelaide may be the perfect track.

== Company ==
Billycart Kids employs Orana at their Port Pirie factory to hand drill, route and hand paint each piece. The company states that it is the only one in the world to ship this kind of product to consumers. The billycart comes as a flat pack and requires assembly.

== Events ==
On 28 March 2010, Billycart Kids sponsored the first Sodexo Roxby Billycart Bash, in Roxby Downs. The event saw over a hundred downhill racers hurtle down the only hill in town in homemade or purchased billycarts. The event raised money for the Roxby Downs Health Service Auxiliary.

== Models ==
2010 model

The Hudson Flyer

Models in production

The Hudson Hornett

== See also ==
- Moose Toys
- Jedko Games
