= Douglas Chaffee =

American artist

Doug Chaffee
- Born: January 24, 1936
- Died: April 26, 2011 (aged 75)
- Known for: Fantasy art

Douglas Stewart Chaffee (January 24, 1936 – April 26, 2011) was an American artist whose work appeared in role-playing games as well as military and Christian publications.

== Early life and education ==
Chaffee was the son of Ralph and Marjorie Chaffee and grew up in Upstate New York. He served in the United States Army and then in the Army National Guard. He studied art and history at Bob Jones University in Greenville, South Carolina.

== Career ==
After college, Chaffee worked at IBM for nearly 20 years, eventually becoming head of the Art Department. After retiring, Chaffee started up his own design company, and produced artwork for TSR for their Dungeons & Dragons role-playing game, including Dungeoneer's Survival Guide (1986); The Emirates of Ylaruam (1987); Needle (1987); both the second edition Player's Handbook and Dungeon Master Guide (1989); The Complete Fighter's Handbook (1989); The Complete Book of Humanoids (1993); Player's Option: Combat & Tactics; Player's Option: Skills & Powers (1995); and the cover art for Cleric's Challenge II (1995).

He also created paintings for other games companies, including Wizards of the Coast's Magic: The Gathering and Dune collectible card games, and the cover art for FASA's The Fall of Terra.

Outside of the games industry, Chaffee also created art and illustrations for NASA, the United States military — Chaffee produced the official program painting for the Trident submarine — as well as for Sunday School and Vacation Bible School literature and Christian-School textbooks. His work can be found in the Smithsonian Institution, National Geographic, and the White House.
