= Technical Readout: 3025 =

1986 tabletop game supplement

Technical Readout: 3025 is a 1986 tabletop game supplement published by FASA for BattleTech.

== Contents ==
Technical Readout: 3025 is a supplement in which a technical supplement catalogs a wide range of BattleMechs, aerospace fighters, DropShips, and vehicles, with illustrations and game statistics for dozens of combat units across multiple classes.

== Publication history ==
Battletech Technical Readout 3025 was written by FASA staff, with art by Duane Loose and David R. Deitrick and published by FASA in 1986 as a 200-page book. The book was also published by Jedko Games of Australia in 1987.

Shannon Appelcline explained in his book Designers & Dragons how with expanding the BattleTech line, "Taking another page out of Traveller's book, FASA also moved toward a metaplot for Battletech. At first this was just reflected in yearly updates: the Battletech Technical Readout: 3025 (1986) was soon replaced by the Battletech Technical Readout: 3026 (1987)."

== Reception ==
The BattleTech Technical Readout won the H.G. Wells Award for Best Supplement of 1986 at the Origins Awards.

== Reviews ==
- GM #2
- Space Gamer/Fantasy Gamer (Issue 78 - Apr 1987)
- PC Guru
- SciFiNow 113
