= The Fall of Terra =

Tabletop miniatures game supplement

Cover art by Doug Chaffee, 1996

The Fall of Terra is a compilation of adventures that was published by FASA in 1996 for the mecha miniatures game BattleTech.

== Contents ==
Comstar, the organization that controls all interstellar communications in the BattleTech universe, is being reformed. Reactionary elements have rebelled against the reforms, resulting in a war with Earth. The Fall of Terra contains sixteen missions for both BattleTech and MechWarrior that explore the battles that decided the fate of ComStar and its opponent, the ultra-orthodox faction The Word of Blake.

The armed forces for both ComStar and The Word of Blake are detailed, as well as notable personalities on both sides. The book also includes special rules for moving on ice, snow and mud. Some of the adventures require rules and data from previously the published source books BattleSpace, MechWarrior, and MechWarrior Companion.

== Publication history ==
The science fiction mecha miniatures BattleTech was published by FASA in 1984, and quickly produced many supplements and adventures as well as a continuing meta-story. One of these supplements was The Fall of Terra, a soft-cover book by Chris Hartford and Bryan Nystul, with artwork by Tom Baxa, John Bridegroom, Storn Cook, Kevin Long, James Nelson, Mike Nielsen, and Christopher Trevas, and cover art by Doug Chaffee.

== Reception ==
In the August 1997 edition of Dragon (Issue #238), Rick Swan gave a good recommendation for this book, saying, "If you’re a BattleTech veteran happy with the third edition (editions one and two are obsolete), there’s no compelling reason to invest in version four. Instead, I direct your attention The Fall of Terra, a compilation of first-rate scenarios dealing with the control of planet Earth."

In Issue 12 of the British game magazine Arcane, Alex Bund gave this a rating of 8 out of 10, saying, "For those who relish the chance to battle across the Earth, this is an excellent supplement, Praise be The Word of Blake."
