= Seattle Sourcebook =

Role-playing game supplement

Seattle Sourcebook is a supplement published by FASA in 1990 for the near-future dystopian role-playing game Shadowrun .

== Contents ==
Seattle Sourcebook is a campaign setting supplement which details the neighborhoods, government, economy, and main corporations of Seattle in the year 2050, and how they interconnect with each other.

== Publication history ==
Seattle Sourcebook was written by Boy F. Petersen, Jr., with a cover by Dana Knutson, and was published by FASA in 1990 as a 176-page book with a foldout map.

Shannon Appelcline noted that in the early 1990s, "Shadowrun was supported by over a dozen supplements each year—some of which were quite well-received, such as Seattle Sourcebook (1990), one of the first extensive RPG descriptions of a modern city, and Nigel Findley's adventure, The Universal Brotherhood (1990)."

== Reception ==
In the November 1992 edition of Dragon (Issue #187), Allen Varney thought that the material in this book "expands spectacularly on the skimpy material included in the [original] Shadowrun rulebook." He concluded "[The book describes its] city in detail unprecedented outside of fantasy RPGs."

== Reviews ==
- Casus Belli #82

== Awards ==
In 1991, Seattle Sourcebook won the Origins Award for Best Graphic Presentation of a Roleplaying Game, Adventure, or Supplement of 1990.
