= BattleTech Record Sheets =

BattleTech supplement

BattleTech Record Sheets are a series of three game supplements published by FASA in 1996 for the wargame BattleTech.

== Description ==
BattleTech Record Sheets are a series of three supplements (3025 & 3026, 3050, and 3055 & 3058) that provide record sheets for mecha and military vehicles used in the game of BattleTech. Each book features pages that are perforated along the spine and hole-punched so they can be torn out and stored in five-ring binders.

Each book varies in the number of record sheets it provides. For example, 3025 & 3026 has 224 pages containing more than 200 records compiled from BattleTech Technical Readout: 3025 and BattleTech Technical Readout: 3026.

3055 & 3058 has 256 pages with 250 sheets compiled from BattleTech Technical Readout: 3055 and BattleTech Technical Readout: 3058.

== Reception ==
In the May 1996 edition of Arcane (Issue 6), Jim Swallow was ambivalent about the record sheets, pointing out that "The cover art is nice, but these are nothing to get excited about - they're books of record sheets. You can get exactly the same thing in a few minutes with the basic rules, a pencil and a copy of the relevant BattleTech Technical Readout." Swallow gave the sheets a below average rating of 4 out of 10.

In the June 1996 edition of Dragon (Issue 230), Rick Swan thought that because the sheets covered so many different vehicles, "this may be the best value in the history of the hobby!"

The German game magazine Envoyer noted, "If you have always found filling out data sheets to be an unpleasant chore, this volume can help you. With over 200 pages, you will find ready-made data sheets for most of the models."

The Australian game magazine Australian Realms noted, "The books include some of the major variants and feature game information for weapons and equipment on each sheet ... Very useful for Battletech commanders everywhere."
