= ... Until Relieved =

1985 role-playing game supplement

... Until Relieved is a 1985 role-playing game adventure published by The Companions for Behind Enemy Lines.

== Plot summary ==
... Until Relieved is an adventure in which the player characters defend their position against overwhelming odds until reinforcements arrive.

== Publication history ==
... Until Relieved was written by Peter L. Rice and published by The Companions in 1986 as a 32-page book.
