= The British in World War II =

The British in World War II is a 1986 role-playing game supplement published by The Companions for Behind Enemy Lines.

== Contents ==
The British in World War II is a supplement in which British, Canadian, Australian, and New Zealand soldiers are featured, with character generation rules, weapon and vehicle descriptions, and eight included short scenarios.

== Publication history ==
The British in World War II was written by Peter L. Rice and published by The Companions in 1986 as a 48-page book.
