= AeroTech =

1996 wargame

- Designers: Jordan Weisman; L. Ross Babcock III
- Publishers: FASA (1984–2001); FanPro LLC (2001–2006); Catalyst Game Labs (2006–present)
- Years active: 1986 to present
- Players: 2+
- Setup time: 5 – 30 minutes
- Playing time: No exact time
- Chance: Dice rolling
- Skills: Tactical, arithmetic

AeroTech is a tabletop wargame published by FASA and set in the BattleTech universe. It simulates combat between aerospace fighters, troop-carrying DropShips, and interstellar JumpShips and WarShips. The name "AeroTech" defines space/air elements of BattleTech universe.

== Editions ==
=== AeroTech ===
AeroTech was a large introduction box set that could be played as a complete independent game that co-exists in the BattleTech universe, compatible with the regular ground game. The rule set introduced aerospace fighters (space/air-capable fighter craft), dropships, and jumpships. AeroTech was later referred to as AeroTech1.

Individual information for dropships, aircraft, and aerospace fighters was listed in out-of-print books: Technical Readout: 2750, Technical Readout: 3025, Technical Readout: 3026, and Dropships and Jumpships (BattleTech) by Clare Hess (Paperback – April 1988). Expanded AeroTech rules were also included in the first edition of Roleplaying Guidebook MechWarrior.

Due to balance problems, AeroTech' was replaced by BattleSpace.

=== BattleSpace ===
BattleSpace was the second edition of BattleTech's air and space rules. This rule set introduced principal rules for warships to the game. It came in a large introduction box like AeroTech, and included an extensive history of the universe up to 3057. Due rule changes, some aircraft/aerospace craft abilities were altered to the point of being rendered useless for gameplay.

A supplement information book was printed for individual vehicles used in the game. Now out of print Technical Readout: 3057.

=== AeroTech2 ===
The third edition of the aerospace rules was based on BattleSpace. There were fewer rules to slow down gameplay. Additional new units were introduced to the games including new warships, aerospace fighters, and dropships. These new units were listed in Technical Readout: 3067 and Technical Readout: 3026 Revised.

AeroTech2 was one of the last rules sets FASA Corporation published before closing in 2001.

=== AeroTech2 Revised ===
The fourth edition cleared up problems encountered in the original AeroTech2 rulebook. Additionally, the book expanded to include new art, mini technical readouts for various aerospace fighters, and the color schemes of factions' navies who have warships. These full-color pictures were of metal warship miniatures.

AeroTech2 Revised, was published in 2003, by new license owners FanPro. The Leviathen II Heavy Battleship (Warship) was an exclusive prize for the winner of a launch event. This edition introduced fighter squadron rules to allow small fighters to be able take on more powerful units in the game.

The supplement book listing individual ships of the game was revised and additional "lost" warships were introduced to the game. The book was renamed Technical Readout: 3057 Revised.

=== Fourth edition ===
The fourth edition of the rules, AeroTech 2R (Revised)" was re-organized when BattleTech relaunched itself in 2006.

=== Fifth edition ===
The fifth edition introduced new construction rules for aerospace units of BattleTech, in a new rule set series named Total Warfare. The playing/construction rules are now being broken up into two sets of rules: tournament and non-tournament. Tournament play rules cover from small craft, fighters, and dropships are placed in the tournament rules sets for play: Total Warfare and construction in TechManual.

Non-tournament rules cover larger units or formations: fighter squadrons, jumpships, warships, and space stations. These rules are found in Strategic Operations and integrate with BattleForce rules set to be able to operate large formation(s) of aerospace units including larger units with the ground assets. In addition, numerous optional advanced rules have been included in SO for aerospace play and construction of advanced aerospace units.

In addition, Strategic Operations also provides for clear rules for interaction with ground units, and abstract gameplay for the large and small aerospace units would before more a campaign setting requiring more details for casual gameplay.

Tactical Operations, another Total Warfare series advance rules book, includes new advanced aerospace type equipment which is considered non-tournament.

New units and historical units were added and reprinted in 2008's Technical Readout: 3075.

Previous publications are compatible or converted for use in the Total Warfare series of rules books.

== Reception ==
Ashley Watkins reviewed BattleTech for Adventurer magazine and stated that "get Citytech for the combat rules, Battletech you want to design your own mechs, Aerotech only if you want the variable geometry mechs, or want to play the space game."

Scott Tanner reviewed AeroTech in Space Gamer/Fantasy Gamer No. 78. Tanner commented that "All in all, AeroTech is a nice game, but is certainly not necessary for the system as a whole."

Stephan Wieck reviewed Aerotech in White Wolf #7 (1987), rating it an 8 out of 10 and stated that "If players want to run an entire Battletech military campaign, then Aerotech is essential."

== Reviews ==
- G.M. The Independent Fantasy Roleplaying Magazine #2
