= Star Trek III Starship Combat Game =

Board game

Star Trek III Starship Combat Game is a 1984 board game published by FASA.

== Gameplay ==
Star Trek III Starship Combat Game includes four different games which simulate battles using starships first seen in the original Star Trek TV series and films.

== Reception ==
Russell Clarke reviewed Star Trek III Combat Game for White Dwarf #63, giving it an overall rating of 8 out of 10, and stated that "Star Trek III is basically a quick, simple game where ships of all sizes get knocked out easily in a fast-paced mobile game."

Chris Baylis reviewed Star Trek III for Imagine magazine, and stated that "If you like good technical combat in which tactics are more effective than lucky dice, disregard the name and read it as the Starship Combat Game. If you are a Star Trek fan, but not technically minded, you will be disappointed."

Craig Sheeley reviewed Star Trek III Starship Combat Game in Space Gamer No. 76. Sheeley commented that "Star Trek III Starship Combat Game is a noble effort, containing elements that would have been welcome in Star Fleet Battles, but I don't think FASA will draw much of Task Force Games' market away. This game is a good one for Trekkies who don't care for the intricacies of Star Fleet Battles, gamers who want the novelty of playing the crew in the Command and Control level, or players of ST:RPG."
