= Player's Option: Combat & Tactics =

Tabletop role-playing game supplement

- Author: L. Richard Baker III and Skip Williams
- Genre: Role-playing game
- Publisher: TSR
- Publication date: 1995
- Media type: Print (Hardcover)
- Pages: 192
- ISBN: 0786900962

Player's Option: Combat & Tactics (abbreviated CT, or C&T) is a supplemental sourcebook to the core rules of the second edition of the Advanced Dungeons & Dragons fantasy role-playing game. This 192-page book was published by TSR, Inc. in 1995. The book was designed by L. Richard Baker III and Skip Williams. Cover art is by Jeff Easley and interior art is by Doug Chaffee, Les Dorscheid, Larry Elmore, Ken and Charles Frank, Roger Loveless, Erik Olson, and Alan Pollack.

== Contents ==
Player's Option: Combat & Tactics is a supplement presenting upgrades and refinements for the combat system of AD&D. Combat & Tactics uses battle maps with 1-inch square grids to keep track of movement in combat. Combat & Tactics uses melee scale as a default for close range combats, in which one square represents a 5-foot square area, and missile scale for outdoor and long-distance combats, in which one square equals a 5-yard area; the Dungeon Master alternates between these two scales depending on the circumstances of the encounter. The weapon proficiency rules have been changed so that player characters can use any weapon they want, if they pay one or more extra proficiency slots. Combat & Tactics breaks the combat round into phases consisting of multiple steps, including initiative and actions.

The book begins with a one-page introduction by Baker and Williams, which explains that this book is intended to provide details to make combat more believable. Chapter One (pages 6–37) describes the Player's Option combat system, which was expanded from the Player's Handbook and Dungeon Master's Guide, and is played on a gridded battle map with 1-inch squares. Chapter Two (pages 38–55) describes a set of combat options for the new combat system, including battle tactics, attack options, fighting styles, dueling, and brawling. Chapter Three (pages 56–69) describes how the climate and terrain of a battlefield affects combat. Chapter Four (pages 70–81) presents details on weapon specialization and mastery, revising the weapon proficiency system from the Player's Handbook. Chapter Five (pages 82–99) provides rules for unarmed combat, including brawling, subduing, and martial arts. Chapter Six (pages 100–115) details two systems for determining critical hits within the game. Chapter Seven (pages 116–151) expands on the weapons and armor presented in the Player's Handbook. Chapter Eight (pages 152–177) details the war machines, and sieges and fortifications of siege warfare. Chapter Nine (pages 178–187) details monsters in combat, particularly creatures in battle, creature types, and attack and armor types of monsters. Pages 189-192 are an index to the book.

== Publication history ==
Player's Option: Combat & Tactics is an AD&D supplement 192-page hardcover book published by TSR, Inc. with design by Skip Williams and L. Richard Baker III and editing by Thomas M. Reid, and featuring illustrations by Kevin and Charles Frank, Roger Loveless, Les Dorscheid, Alan Pollack, Doug Chaffee, and Erik Olson and a cover by Jeff Easley.

In 1995, TSR re-released the core rulebooks for 2nd Edition featuring new covers, art, and page layouts. These releases were followed shortly by a series of volumes labeled Player's Option, allowing for alternative rules systems and character options, as well as a Dungeon Master's Option for high-level campaigns. These releases are sometimes referred to as "Edition 2.5" by fans.

Wizards of the Coast republished Player's Option: Combat & Tactics as a softcover in 1997, the same year that they acquired TSR.

== Reception ==
Rick Swan reviewed Player's Option: Combat and Tactics for Dragon magazine #221 (September 1995). He says that in describing the AD&D combat system, "Combat & Tactics scrapes the mold off the core system, dresses it up in a new suit, and teaches it to behave. If the core system is Frankenstein's monster, Combat & Tactics is Miss Manners." He felt that Player's Option: Combat & Tactics stands as a model of organization, with clear explanations, logical arguments, and a generous number of examples [...] Where the designers deem it necessary to rehash old information, they go out of their way to improve the language." He also notes that the book "also attempts to eradicate ambiguities specified or implied in the core system, providing lucid definitions of called shots, grappling, and "range only" weapons. Occasionally, the designers cram too much information into the same sentence. [...] But overall, it's a first-class performance." He felt that three concepts in particular stand out, because "they address and — for the most part — correct problematic areas in the core system, they seem strong candidates for inclusion in the average campaign": the movement grid, movement scales, and weapon proficiencies. Swan comments on the movement grid: "While far from perfect — squares work well in rectangular dungeons, not so well in circular towers — the grids make the DM's life easier by providing simple, intuitive answers to common questions." He comments on the two different movement scales: "Switching back and forth isn't confusing in the least; it's like using the zoom lens on a camera. Statistics are easy to convert [and] computing distances becomes second nature [...] With two scales, just about any encounter can be staged on a table top." He adds: "Suffice to say, Combat & Tactics combat is so detailed, it's a game in itself. But fortunately, it's a pretty good one. Slicing combat into tiny pieces requires players to make more decisions; consequently, they're more vulnerable to missteps but less dependent on the outcome of any given die-roll. The system rewards competence and punishes stupidity — just like a real battlefield." Noting the fatigue rules and another rule that gives a bonus against ranged attacks, Swan comments: "When you start piling modifiers on top of modifiers, some rules become more trouble than they’re worth." He also notes that of the movement rules, "Though the square grid facilitates movement, it's also easy to exploit", explaining that diagonal movement is not equal to moving in a straight line. In his evaluation, Swan conclucded that "if you consider combat a key element of the AD&D game — or, perhaps, its primary purpose — then Combat & Tactics succeeds in two critical areas. First, it lets you tailor the combat system to the style of your campaign. If you prefer quick-and-dirty clashes between armies, use the mass combat rules; if you want to linger over every scratch and scrape, use the critical hit tables. Second, and more importantly, Combat & Tactics captures the visceral feel of combat: the blood and the sweat, the sting of a sword, the heady jolt of victory. Despite all the numbers, I always felt like a warrior, never an accountant." He also adds: "Combat & Tactics makes combat more flexible (with tactical maneuvers for every occasion), sensible (the improved proficiency rules) and chaotic (unlike standard AD&D, there's a real danger from friendly fire). And it's all compatible with the core system."

== Reviews ==
- Backstab #8
- Casus Belli #89
- Australian Realms #26
- Dragão Brasil #11
