= VOR: The Maelstrom =

VOR: The Maelstrom is a science fiction miniature wargame, set in the 22nd century. It was published by FASA in 1999, but was discontinued following FASA's cessation of activities in 2001. The rules are written for 28mm skirmish games and include both set forces and rules for creating custom forces.

== Background ==
In the VOR universe, the Earth has been sucked into a pocket universe known as the Maelstrom. Factions in the game include the following:

- The Union: The North American Union is the combination of all North American nations; they possess advanced technology and superior tactics.
- Neo-Soviets: Resurgent communist Russian forces, with crude but powerful weapons and mutated animals. The Neo-Soviet Empire cares for the nation as a whole and not any one citizen. It employs chemical and radiation weapons at will. The "human wave" tactic is the most common strategy used.
- Growlers: The Growlers are primate-like monsters directed by the pack's collective packmind, strong and adaptable, and the main enemies of the Zykhee. The four main breeds are:

- Razorbacks - The razorback breed inhabits areas of high metallic ore concentrations. Their spines and teeth are now made of metal.
- Bluefangs - The bluefangs inhabit any lush jungle or forest they can find. As ambush hunters they will sit and wait for prey, but tend to graze their area as well, making them bloated by the sheer volume of food taken in.
- Fireguts - These growlers have actually used heat to release the energy of their food rather than chemical reactions. They inhabit areas of volcanic activity and have the ability to spit lava.
- Whitetusks - The most intelligent of growlers, the Whitetusks are the best coordinated of all the breeds. Identified by their white fur and large tusks coming from their heads they make up the smallest of the growler breeds.

- Zykhee: Vaguely humanoid aliens with advanced technology, powerful melee weapons and spiritual abilities.
- Shard: The Shard are a race of lifeforms who have transcended physical form and have become pure energy. Upon entering the Maelstrom they found the need to encase said energy/essence in crystalline forms. Vaguely humanoid in shape, the Shard have an extreme hatred for 'carbons' (carbon-based lifeforms), and stop at nothing to wipe them out.
- Pharon: The Pharon are a dead race. Formerly mummified, similar to the mummies of Ancient Egypt the strange energies of the Maelstrom have reanimated them. They attack other races for their life-giving fluids and parts. The Pharon often reanimate their enemies to serve as slaves until such time as the slaves fall apart.
- Mashers: The Mashers are very primitive creatures, yet they can 'mash' (meld) with technology. They are a race of scavengers, and bear a physical similarity to Neandertals.
- Golem: These solid creatures wear power armour. They are actually two creatures – a mindless host and an intelligent parasite, who enslave and conquer worlds.
- Ceru: The Ceru are a race of blue, gnomish beings who were enslaved by the Golem, but broke free when the Golem's homeworld (where the Ceru happened to be at the time) got sucked into the Maelstrom. They specialize in vehicles and are constantly on the move.

== Publishing history ==
The setting allowed players to include new forces as other worlds are consumed by the Maelstrom and had guidelines to create rules for them. Unfortunately the complete custom force rules were never published. Since Vor went out of print, other games such as Ætherverse have offered universal design systems.

Mike "Skuzzy" Nielsen, is both creator of the game, and an avid Vor mascot. A Vor 2.0 game was announced in 2008 (on the now-defunct Official VOR: The Maelstrom 2.0 website), but failed its 2010 Kickstarter campaign fundraising goal of US$25,000 and has since been shelved.

== Reviews ==
- Backstab #24
- Casus Belli #122
