= BattleTech Compendium =

Wargame supplement

BattleTech Compendium is a sourcebook published by FASA in 1990 for the table-top miniatures mecha wargame BattleTech.

== Contents ==
BattleTech Compendium is a supplement that seeks to combine the disparate sources of information into one volume. It combines the main armored combat resolution rules from BattleTech, CityTech, and AeroTech, focusing on battlemechs, as well as armored vehicles and aerospace fighters. The book uses battlemech and vehicle game statistics from BattleTech Technical Readout 2750 and 3050 and Dropships and Jumpships, as well as new designs, and it takes the place of the previously published BattleTech Manual.

The history of the BattleTech universe has also been updated to bring the rules in line with events depicted in the BattleTech novels that had been published.

== Publication history ==
FASA published the miniatures wargame BattleTech in 1984, and many supplements and sourcebooks followed. BattleTech Compendium, published in 1990, is a 144-page softcover book written by the FASA staff, with artwork by Earl Geier, James Nelson, and Mike Nielsen.

== Reception ==
In the March 1995 edition of Science Fiction Age, David Honigsberg noted "the creators of those robotic warriors have created a gift for their fans in the form of Battletech Compendium: The Rules of Warfare ... Over the years, various supplements, rulebooks, and sourcebooks have been published which have altered and sometimes complicated the rules of play, putting together a gameplaying galaxy that has meant players have to sift through many volumes for the bits of lore they need for successful gaming. No more. This volume supersedes all previously published rules." Honigsberg concluded that the book was "Required reading for all Battletech fans."

In Issue 20 of the Australian game magazine Australian Realms, Ron Fielding commented, "Apart from the fact that is nice to have all the rules in readily referenced in one book, and a durable hardcover at that, the main attraction of this product is the number of glorious full colour plates featuring computer generated art excerpted from the animated cartoon series. Spectacular and inspirational, or what!" Fielding concluded, "For veterans and the uninitiated (where have you been for the past ten years?), the BattleTech Compendium is a good repackaging of an excellent game and would make a lovely Christmas present."

In Issue 216 of Dragon, Ken Carpenter noted the book was "Replete with good to excellent artwork and compelling background material, the newest Compendium involves you in the life and death struggle of the Inner Sphere. Two sections of full-cover, glossy pages present incredible computer graphics of 'mechs in action." Carpenter concluded, "The clarifications don't seem to change many of these rules so much as spell them out in a clear and concise way."

== Awards ==
In 1991, BattleTech Compendium won the Origins Award for Best Miniatures Rules of 1990.

== Other reviews & commentary ==
- GamesMaster International, Issue 7 (Feb. 1991, p.29)
- GamesMaster International, Issue 9 (April 1991, p.71)
- Future Wars, Issue 20 (p. 8)
- Armadillo Droppings, Issue 30 (Summer/Fall 1994, p. 17)
- White Wolf Inphobia #52 (February 1995, p.80)
