= Nanovor =

- Developer: Smith & Tinker
- Engine: 3D Unity
- Platforms: PC, Mac, iOS, Nanoscope
- Modes: Single-player, multiplayer

Website
- Industry: Video Games
- Website: https://www.nanovor.com/
- Current status: Purchased by another owner

Nanovor was a massively multi-player online card battle video game developed by Smith & Tinker. It was the first release in a planned multimedia franchise to be marketed to the American youth demographic. After reaching 2 million "splatters", or PvP kills, the game was shut down. On April 16, 2012, a version was released on iOS devices, which received little fanfare. The iOS version of the game was later removed from the App Store.

== Gameplay ==
The game was played with 2-4 players, where a player used their Nanovor teams (called Swarms) to battle the other swarms. This was accomplished by using three attacks (or in rare cases, four), unique to each Nanovor to deal damage and lower opposing teams' values. Each Nanovor had 4 value types: Power, Armor, Speed and Health. The Power value determined how much damage each attack dealt, the Armor value controlled how much damage was blocked, the Speed value was influential in deciding who attacked first in battle, and the Health value was indicative of the Nanovor's current HP. Additionally, each attack required a certain amount of energy to play, where energy was increased by two points after each round. Players could also swap in other Nanovor to fit their chosen strategy. They can also use various Hacks and Mods to change up the game in various ways - like swap-blocking an opponent and using things called spikes to upgrade an attack. When a Nanovor gets down to health level 0, it gets "splattered" and thus, is removed from the game. The first one to splatter all the opposing swarms wins.

=== Power mechanics ===
The amount of damage any given attack dealt was based on the Power value of the attacking Nanovor, and how the attack itself changes the amount of damage dealt. For example, if a Nanovor with 100 strength used an attack which has damage equal to half of its strength, the Nanovor would do exactly 50 damage. The damage was always rounded to the nearest whole number.

=== Armor Mechanics ===
The Armor stat affected how much damage was taken off attacks that the Nanovor was hit with. The amount of damage blocked was equivalent to the value of the Armor stat, meaning that if a Nanovor with 100 Health and 50 Armor was hit with an attack that dealt 75 damage, the Nanovor would only take 25 points of damage.

=== Speed Mechanics ===
The Nanovor that attacked first in battle was determined based on the speed of every Nanovor in the battle at that time. Their speed values directly corresponded to their chances of attacking first. This means that if there were two Nanovor fighting, one of them having 80 speed and the other having 20, the chances of one going first would be 80/20.

== Story ==
As the Earth became an oxygen based environment, A species known as Nanovor went extinct, covering the planet with their corpses becoming sand, crystal and silicon. In 1961, scientists first pulsed electricity through a silicon chip, awakening the dormant creatures. Today, Nanovor live inside everything with a computer chip and are transmitted via the Internet. Nanovor must produce massive amounts of adrenaline to survive in our oxygen based environment. They enjoy fighting as it allows them to produce more adrenaline.

== Game-related information ==
An announcement made on December 13, 2010, scheduled the official discontinuation of the game, which took place on December 31, 2010.

The game could originally be played in two formats: on the computer and via the Nanoscope, an accessory released in October 2009 that allowed for single and multi-player gaming while on the go. The game could be downloaded directly from the Nanovor site, or a DVD-ROM disk found in various items. When players open the game, they could battle others, manage their Nanovor and profile, and more. On the desktop version, players had the option of playing local singleplayer or online multi-player.

=== The Nanoscope ===
The Nanoscope accessory appears similar to those used in-game by the 'Lab Rats', the series' protagonists. There were three ways that players can use the Nanoscope. It could be played solo, in a gamemode known as "Training Mode"; it could connect via WiFi to other Nanoscopes, which allowed for short-distance multi-player; and it could connect to a computer via a USB cable, which allowed for online play through the Nanoscope. With the Nanoscope, the player could increase how powerful any Nanovor was by playing minigames, which were available in Training Mode. These minigames earned the player Jolts, an in-game currency which in turn could be added to any of the Nanovor's statistics, increasing their values, with the notable exemption of swarm values.

=== Collection tab ===
Through the Collection tab, players could view their collection of Nanovor, and see detailed information about their statistics. Each Nanovor was a member of one of three families: Magnamods, whose armor statistics had higher values, and were typically associated with the color red; Velocitrons, which were associated with the color yellow and had many Hacks and Mods, points used for special attacks in-game; and Hexites, which tended to be blue, and had attacks that could ignore armor, dealing full damage regardless of the target's armor value. Additionally, each Nanovor had a swarm value, determining how powerful it was as an individual. These values allowed the player to combine them into a group known as a swarm, which dealt more damage than they would have individually. However, while making a swarm of Nanovors, only up to 1000 points worth of swarm value were allowed per swarm.

=== Profile tab ===
Players could see their personal statistics, change their avatar, and view their earned badges through the Profile tab. Badges were proof accomplishments that had been completed, and functioned similar to the way Trophies and Achievements work in modern titles. Some badges gave players rewards, while others were specifically progression-based, and were needed to evolve certain Nanovor. These Nanovor would not have otherwise evolved without earning their respective badges.

=== Get Nanovor tab ===
This tab would have let players purchase Booster Packs to get new Nanovor and EMs. Purchasing these packs required Nanocash that could be purchased from the site, or by redeeming Game cards found at participating retailers, like Best Buy, Walmart and GameStop in the United States.

== See also ==
- FusionFall
- Wizard101
