= Roger Loveless =

American fantasy artist

- Known for: Fantasy art

Roger Loveless is an American fantasy artist whose work has appeared in role-playing games.

== Career ==
Loveless graduated from Utah State University, then moved to Los Angeles to begin freelancing as an illustrator. He has worked for clients from the entertainment industry, publishing, and advertising, including Milton Bradley, Nickelodeon, and Paramount Studios. He has created packaging illustrations for some Super NES and Genesis games and for G.I. Joe products. His Dungeons & Dragons work includes Vale of the Mage (1989), Legends & Lore (1990), Castles (1990), Tome of Magic (1991), Slayers of Lankhmar (1992), Cities of Bone (1994), Player's Option: Combat & Tactics (1995), and Warlock of the Stonecrowns (1995).

Loveless is also known for his inspirational images of Jesus Christ.
