= Demonworld =

Demonworld is a tabletop wargame originally created by Hobby Products, a German gaming company. The game went out of production for several years but has recently been purchased and re-released by Ral Partha Europe, as announced on 8 June 2011.

The game is a fantasy wargame making use of 15mm metal miniatures. The races included in the game world, each of which has a line of miniatures to represent it, includes an assortment of standard fantasy races: humans (who are represented by two factions, the feudal Empire and the barbarian Thain), elves, dwarves, dark elves, orcs, and goblins, as well a faction unique to the game, the Icelords of Isthak (made up of ice witches, ice demons, and boar-like beastmen). Each race has its own troops, war machines, heroes, wizards, and "behemoths" -- large creatures such as humanoid giants, giant spiders with war howdahs on their backs (goblins), dragon riders (humans, elves), and so on.

The game was originally introduced in 1999 by Hobby Products GmbH, but went out of print after several years mostly due to large problems with Hobby Products' restocking policy, despite the popularity of the miniatures. The line was eventually acquired by Ral Partha Europe, which has re-released the entire miniatures line, along with some new miniatures (lizardmen). As of 2014, Fasa Games Inc. has a third edition of the miniatures game in production, as well as a table-top RPG which will expand the setting to a much more personal, character-based experience.

== Gameplay ==
Demonworld is a wargame designed to be played as a tabletop wargame using "armies" of 15mm scale miniatures. The miniatures used in the game, which were all originally sculpted by a single sculptor, Werner Klocke, are actually slightly larger than 15mm for a typical human—around 18mm tall—and therefore resemble a "heroic 15mm" scale similar to the "heroic 25mm" scale used for other noted fantasy wargames.

In the original game, miniatures are organized into units, with several miniatures typically mounted on a single hexagonal base. Either four or five ordinary infantry figures are mounted on a single base; two ordinary cavalry miniatures; one large cavalry miniature, hero or wizard, or other special figure in some cases. Many "behemoth" miniatures, which represent huge war beasts or monsters, are mounted singly on several bases joined together to form a single larger base.

"Armies" are chosen by the players based on a points value system. The army list books published for the game include data cards with points values and statistics for the miniatures used in the game, as well as simple formulas which show what proportion of troops should be included in the "armies". This is designed to create more verisimilitude as well as better balanced "armies" with a fair number of ordinary troops, rather than "armies" made up entirely of extremely powerful special troops.

The original rules make use of twenty-sided and six-sided dice (d20s and d6s) to decide the outcome of combat, test the "morale" of decimated "units", and so forth. The game was designed to be played on mapsheets printed with terrain and movement hexes, in the manner of earlier wargames using printed counters. Several mapsheets were included in the basic box and more were available as separate map packs. The rules were divided into basic, intermediate, and advanced sections, each of which introduced successively more detailed rules. For example, movement, basic combat, and morale were basic rules, while magic was an intermediate rule and flying creatures such as dragons and wyverns were covered in the advanced rules.

Ral Partha Europe has stated that it plans to offer PDF versions of the original rules for the game, and at the same time work on a completely revamped set of rules in keeping with modern tabletop wargame design. These new rules will include support for both hex map games in the style of the original game, or for a "non-hex" version which can be used with tabletop scenery and measuring tapes in the more typical modern wargame style, according to forum posts by RPE personnel.

== Factions and races ==
All of the factions thus far introduced in Demonworld are fully represented by a line of 15mm metal miniatures, as well as supplemental army list books containing special rules, data cards for troops, and a certain amount of fictional background information designed to give the game more interest. The background information does not amount to a fully realized "game world" as in the case of some other games, but there is still extensive information about the fictional "Demonworld" world.

=== Empire ===
The Empire is a fictional faction within the Demonworld game with a strongly feudal European feel. This faction's troops include pikemen, crossbowmen, longbowmen, hunter-like rangers, and a wide variety of cavalry, including armored knights as well as more lightly armed horsemen. War machines of this faction include artillery and chariots, while the faction's behemoths include dragon riders and mobile fighting towers drawn by oxen. The Empire bears a slight resemblance to a highly fictionalized Holy Roman Empire in its culture and mundane troop types. The Empire is made up mainly of humans, though it does include some allied dwarfs as well.

=== Thain ===
The Thain are another human faction, though with a barbarian culture loosely based on both Scandinavian "Viking" raiders and early northern Celts. The Thain's armies are based around a range of different infantry types, though there is also cavalry. Special troops include summoned animal spirits, boar-riding cavalry, and trained wolverines. The Thain's war machines are limited to balistae, but their behemoths include a variety of huge, antlered creatures, some of which are fitted with fighting howdahs. Their culture is portrayed as a typical fantasy "barbarian" society.

== Video game adaptation ==
A video game adaptation was released in 1997. A sequel, Demonworld: Dark Armies, was released in 2002. It is a real-time strategy game. It won GameSpot's 2002 "Worst Game on PC" award; the editors called it a "game that's so incredibly bad that it truly must be the work of the devil."

== Reviews ==
- Backstab #3
- Casus Belli #111
