= Smith & Tinker =

American electronic entertainment company

- Type: Privately held
- Industry: Entertainment
- Founded: April 2007
- Defunct: November 8, 2012
- Headquarters: Bellevue, Washington, U.S.
- Key people: Jordan Weisman; Joe Lawandus; Tim Lebel; Charles Merrin; Ryan Kyle
- Products: Nanovor
- Revenue: 29,000,000
- Number of employees: 40
- Website: http://www.smithandtinker.com

Smith & Tinker was an American electronic entertainment company founded in February 2007 by Jordan Weisman, Jeremy Bornstein, Lenny Raymond, and Kev Ray. Weisman later brought in Tim Lebel and Joe Lawandus. On October 15, 2007, they announced that they had licensed from Microsoft the rights for Weisman's previous creations of MechWarrior, Shadowrun, Crimson Skies and other FASA titles and would be announcing their plans for these intellectual properties at a later date.

The name of the company was based upon the fictional characters Smith & Tinker, an artist and an inventor who are briefly mentioned in the Land of Oz series of books as the creators of Tik-Tok the machine man. This was evidenced by the mention of Emerald City on the company web site, and the use of Tik-Tok in the company logo.

The first game from Smith & Tinker was called Nanovor. Nanovor was an online battle game targeted to 7–12 year olds. Nanovor was released to public beta in May 2009. The company later released iOS games, one called Whirleo and another featuring Marvel Comics characters called KAPOW!

Contrary to rumors, Smith & Tinker was not in any way involved with MechWarrior Online, as after the failure to find funding for MechWarrior 5 in conjunction with Piranha Games, Piranha purchased Smith & Tinker's license to the MechWarrior franchise which in turn is licensed from Microsoft.

Smith & Tinker closed down on November 8, 2012.
