= Battledroids =

Board game

Battledroids box art

Battledroids is a 1984 board game published by FASA.

It would be renamed to BattleTech for its second edition in 1985 and spawn the BattleTech/MechWarrior military science fiction gaming franchise and setting with numerous board games, video games, roleplaying games, a collectible card game, comics, magazines, over a hundred novels to date and a television series.

== Gameplay ==
Battledroids is a board game of giant robot combat, which came in a box including a 40-page rulebook on slick paper, an identical pair of 17" x 22" terrain maps, four cardstock sheets of robot miniatures counters, a set of dice and two 3" plastic robot models.

== Reception ==
Trevor Mendham reviewed Battledroids for White Dwarf #66, giving it an overall rating of 7 out of 10, and stated that "Overall, this is a well-written, easy-to-understand set of rules. Much of the design is clearly specific to robot combat and succeeds in capturing the flavour of this sort of battle. As it stands, Battledroids is a very good robot combat system, but very little in terms of a 'game'. The production quality leads one to expect more."

Aaron Allston reviewed Battledroids in The Space Gamer No. 75. Allston commented that "My recommendation? Buy Battledroids if you'd like a giant-robots boardgame that has nothing to do with the Japanese cartoons. It's a decent game. You won't throw away any of your other games to play Battledroids full-time, but you'll be adequately entertained."

== Reviews ==
- Isaac Asimov's Science Fiction Magazine
- Asimov's Science Fiction v9 n12 (1985 12)
