= I.S.P.M.V.: Fenris / S.F.V. Valkyrie =

Science-fiction role-playing game supplement

- Designers: L. Ross Babcock III
- Publishers: FASA
- Publication: 1980; 45 years ago
- Genres: Science fiction
- Systems: Classic Traveller

I.S.P.M.V.: Fenris / S.F.V. Valkyrie is a role-playing game supplement for Traveller published by FASA in 1980.

== Contents ==
I.S.P.M.V.: Fenris / S.F.V. Valkyrie is a set of deck plans for the Fenris, a 3000-ton heavily armed Q-ship masquerading as a cargo vessel, and its eight small Valkyrie fighters. The supplement is based on the spaceship creation rules originally published in Traveller Book 5: High Guard.

In addition to the rulebook, the supplement includes ten pages of 11" x 17" blueprints in 15 mm scale for the Fenris, and two sheets of additional descriptions.

== Publication history ==
I.S.P.M.V.: Fenris was written by L. Ross Babcock III and was published in 1981 by FASA as an eight-page pamphlet and 10 large map sheets.

== Reception ==
Several reviewers questioned the efficacy of this supplement. In the July 1981 edition of The Space Gamer (Issue No. 41), William A. Barton questioned the value of the supplement, which was relatively expensive: "I feel I.S.P.M.V.: Fenris to be just a bit overpriced for what the buyer is actually getting. For a referee who wants new ship plans and doesn't have the time or skill to create his own, FASA's creations might come in handy. Otherwise, it would probably be better to do your own."

That same month, in Issue 51 of Dragon, Tony Watson also questioned the value of the supplement for referees who enjoyed creating their own work: "If the referee is conversant in constructing vessels that the players enjoy and has a sufficiency of such ships, then he probably should not buy these playing aids. But if for any reason he finds new ships attractive, these are good candidates."

In Issue 18 of Different Worlds, Doug Houseman noted several shortcomings: the larger blueprints were split between two sheets of paper but often at critical points; the use of black and white as opposed to colour or grey scale meant that certain areas on the blueprints were ambiguous. However, he found the plans to be professionally done, and would be useful for campaigns where the player characters were passengers on a large merchant ship.
