= BattleTech Centers =

Commercial virtual entertainment venues

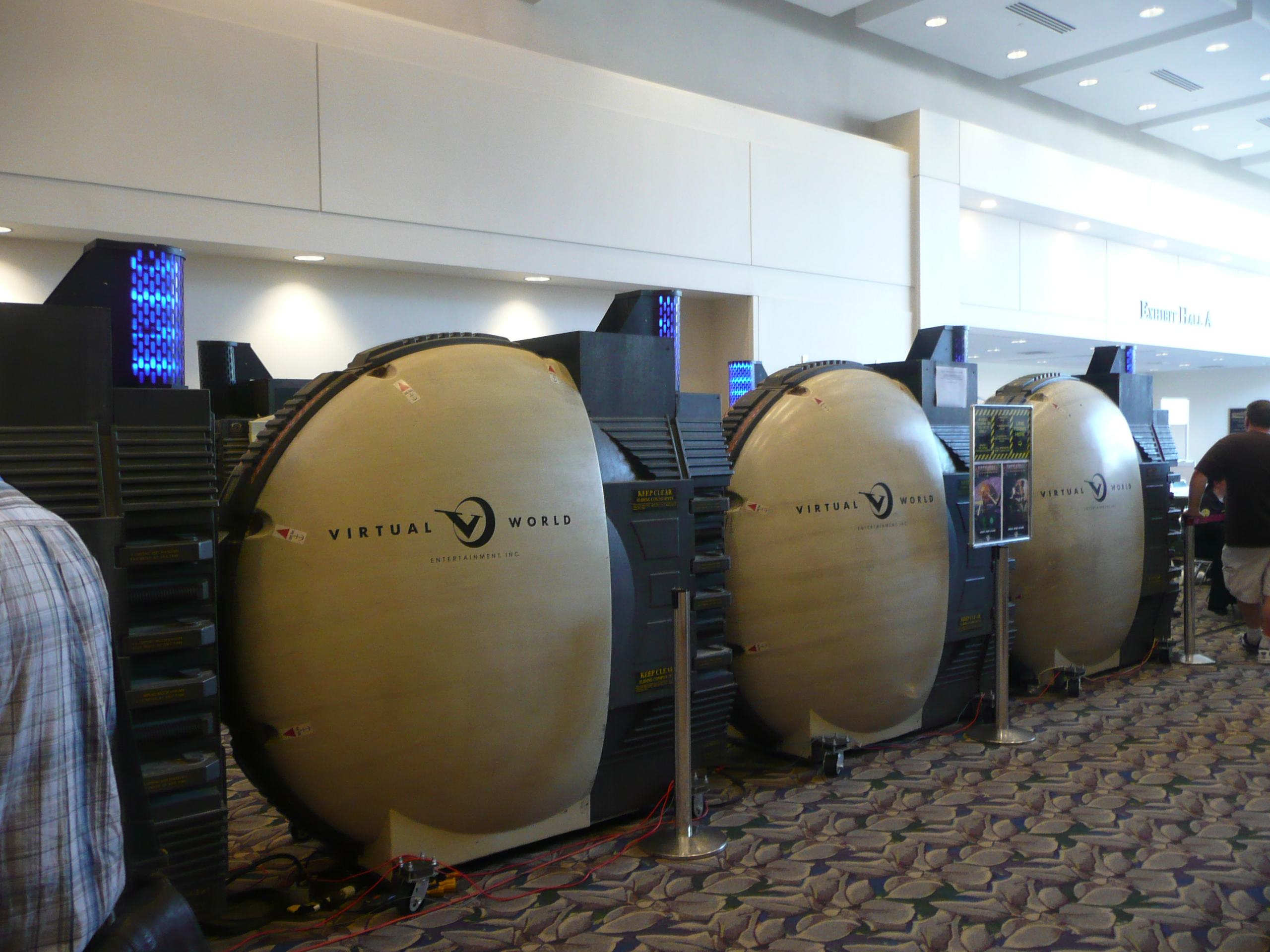
BattleTech Centers at Gen Con Indy 2009

BattleTech Centers are commercial virtual entertainment venues that feature multiplayer virtual combat in the fictional BattleTech universe. The games are played in fully enclosed cockpits with multiple screens, joysticks, and rudder pedals. Today, the gaming cockpits can now be found in only 2 sites listed in table below in the United States.

The BattleTech Center later became known as “Virtual World Centers” as the organization expanded its product line and the quantity of physical storefronts. The development of cockpit based simulators and their deployment were key to the development of “Location Based Entertainment” in the early 1990s and early adoption of “Virtual Reality Centers” in public awareness.

== History ==
=== Early Development & Prototyping ===
The initial concept for the BattleTech Center was developed by Jordan Weisman and L. Ross Babcock while they were students at the Merchant Marine Academy and being exposed to the Bridge Simulators used to train cadets. Weisman believed that this technology could provide a new type of entertainment.

To bring this concept to life, Weisman and Babcock worked to use off the shelf technology to bring the concept of a simulated starship bridge, with different players operating different positions like the bridge crew of “Star Trek.” The concept proved untenable at the time due to technological limitations. Weisman and Babcock would found FASA Corporation in 1980, and the virtual reality project would continue under the label of ESP which officially was branded as Environmental Simulations Project but was also known internally as Extremely Secret Project.

The development of the tabletop BattleTech game by FASA in 1984, created a new avenue to explore in a virtual reality setting. The concept of utilizing multiple networked cockpit simulators with players fighting with and against each other while piloting BattleMechs began to gel. Weisman and Babcock began to develop the idea, seek investors, and develop prototype systems under the ESP name.

ESP chose Incredible Technologies, based in Vernon Hills Illinois as the initial co-developer on the project in 1988. The Incredible Technologies team would include leaders in US arcade game development including Tim Skelly and George Gomez. The prototype system featured 4 networked cockpits playing in one game instance. Controls included a left and right hand joystick with a trigger and two top firing buttons. The two joysticks controlled the two “arms” of the BattleMech and the weapons on each arm. Two target reticles would be on screen for independent targeting control. A center based throttle would control vehicle speed, while two foot pedals would be used for steering. The primary video display would be a 24” Wells Gardner color raster monitor, providing an “out the window” view for the cockpit. A second 12” color monitor would be a secondary display that would display radar, map, damage display and a help screen. Additional LED displays would be used for Weapons systems, damage messages and a BattleMech heat scale. 36 buttons would be used for weapon assignment, and 6 rocker switches would be used for control modifications.

The primary video display was based on a Texas Instruments CPU that was originally designed for production video titling and could process a very high number of sprites onscreen. Commodore Amiga 500’s would be used to render graphics on the secondary screen. Sprite rotation and scaling would be the heart of the primary graphic display in the game.

The 32MB Ram limitation of the hardware led to the shared arm and leg geometry of the BattleMechs. Two sets of legs, and three sets of arms would be used on 4 central torso chassis. This limitation would define the look of the 4 BattleMechs used in the game, and would be revealed in FASA BattleTech 3050 Technical Readout publication. With the dual ownership of FASA & ESP, artwork would be shared between the two entities and the new Madcat, Vulture, Loki and Thor designs would begin to be featured in FASA products with the Madcat design becoming iconic for the product line.

The 4 player system prototype would be used by ESP to continue to raise investor backing in the concept. The system would be repurposed for its first public unveiling in 1989 at the Detroit Auto Show, reskinned as a Jeep racing simulator game. Later that year, the BattleTech Center concept would be unveiled at the Summer Consumer Electronics Show in Chicago, Illinois. With investment backing secured, the concept would be refined for the first retail site to be opened in 1990.

=== System 1 ===
ESP & Incredible Technologies would refine the prototype cockpit based on playtest feedback. The center throttle and second targeting joystick would be dropped from the design. The right hand joystick would be retained with only one targeting reticle onscreen. The throttle would be moved to the left hand side of the cockpit, and the LED and CRT monitor layout would be retained.

Gameplay would be expanded to support up to six players in one game instance. Combat would be in a desert environment with randomly generated obstacles on the game map. The environment could be rendered in day/night/dusk lighting conditions with minor weather/fogging effects available as well.

The six player game cockpits would be communicating over an ARCNet network. Game event highlights would be sent back to the central Console to create a mission review scoresheet. The entire experience would include a 5 minute training video, and a 10 minute game session, followed by reviewing a game score sheet printed for each player. While two sets of 8 cockpits would be deployed onsite, game stability would drop under the 8 player network load. This resulted in cockpits on each set being held in reserve as backups in the event that other cockpits were down due to technical or maintenance issues. Heavy traffic, 6 player games could see frame rates of 12-14 fps as regular experience. System 1 cockpits would only be deployed at the Chicago BattleTech Center. Each pod contained an Amiga 500, custom graphics coprocessor, and a custom audio coprocessor. Mech models were created on the Amiga using Sculpt 4D (August 1990 issue of Amazing Computing : Amiga, p. 95).

==== System 2 ====
Development of System 2 began in 1991, with ESP rebranding as Virtual World Entertainment. Cockpit hardware would be replaced with a CPU based on the Texas Instruments TMS 34010 processor to drive real-time 3D polygon rendering, while a Commodore Amiga 500 would be used for secondary screen rendering. The goal of the new game engine would be to maintain a higher frame rate, and maintain 8 players in one instance with stability and a relatively high frame rate compared to System 1.

The cockpit design would retain the System 1 layout and controls. A new rotating player seat would aide in egress in and out of the cockpit. Games would be served from a central A/Rose enabled Macintosh computer over an ArcNet Network. Game highlights would be compiled into individual player score sheets, and for the first time a spool file of game events would be created, sent over an AppleTalk Network to a Mission Review computer. After a 10 minute game, players would then review their score sheet while an accelerated Mission Review would be played.

Some members of the original Incredible Technologies design team would stay on with VWE, and VWE would invest in hiring its own team of engineers and programmers to develop System 2, led by Weisman and Babcock. System 2 would be deployed at the Yokohama site in August 1992, and soon after deployed in Chicago in October. Six player frame rates usually were 20-22 FPS. 8 player, high traffic games with heavy on screen geometry would drop to 14-18 FPS.

=== System 2.5 ===
Tim Disney (Via Shamrock Holdings) would purchase VWE in 1992, and the cockpits would see their first major redesign, tied with an overall rebranding of the VWE Cockpit experience. The initial concept of players going to a 31st Century BattleMech Pilot Training Facility would be replaced with the concept of the Virtual Geographic League and the cockpits being a dimensional transport. This would open up the story telling for letting a single cockpit platform be used for different game worlds/environments. The clean white cockpit design would be replaced with a heavy, dark, rectangular design that featured individual cockpit art on each cockpit.

Internally, System 2.5 would be nearly identical to System 2, but would feature a revised sound card solution where a separate sound/amp board would be utilized for the first time. System 2.5 would be rolled out at the Walnut Creek Virtual World Center in 1993. System 2.5 would also see the launch of VWE’s second game, "Red Planet". Red Planet would be developed internally at VWE, again led by Weisman & Babcock. Red Planet would be a racing game, set on the mining canals of Mars. To increase player interaction, courses would be one long corridor, with vehicles heading both ways, frequently under rocket powered boosters.

==== System 3 ====
VWE would refine the design again with the System 3 cockpit. The CPU would be upgraded to a Texas Instruments TMS 34020, and the sound board would be redesigned to sit in the cockpit card cage, instead of behind the primary monitor. System 3 cockpits would externally be the same as System 2.5

With System 3, VWE would support both BattleTech and Red Planet development through 1996. Hull Pressure, a 3rd submarine based game would begin development on System 3 but would transition to System 4 and be renamed. System 3 would see the implementation of SiteLink technology, allowing cockpits at different sites in the United States to play each other via ISDN networking. SiteLink would go live in 1994, connecting Chicago, Atlanta, Houston, Dallas, Las Vegas, Denver, Walnut Creek and San Diego sites. System 3 cockpits would go on to be deployed in Toronto, Kyoto, Sacramento, London and additional locations in Japan and Australia. At their peak, more than 300 cockpits were deployed around the world.

=== System 4 (Tesla System) ===
VWE would begin development of their 4th Generation cockpit, named the Tesla System in late 1994. An entirely new game engine would be built around the Division Limited Pixel Planes Technology allowing for high resolution, texture mapped 3D polygons with a target, locked frame rate of 30FPS.

Large card cages would be excised from the design, moving to a PC based design. The Division Pixel Planes card would require 2 EISA slots on the motherboard, and for sound support the Tesla system would utilize 2 EISA Creative Sound Blaster PRO cards to support the Tesla cockpits 12 speakers breathing a full, 3D sound experience. The CPU was initially an Intel Pentium P90 by way of a DEC Prioris XL PC. Later, the Tesla system would use Micronics M6ME Pentium Pro 200 motherboards. The remaining components would remain the same.

Internally the cockpit would be centered around a primary display that was being reflected through a beam splitter into an Infinity Optics curved mirror. Surrounding the primary display would be 5 monochrome auxiliary monitor displays intended for vehicle/weapon information, and a full color secondary monitor display for map displays. The joystick would be upgraded to a HAPP B6 joystick with tophat featuring HP optical encoders, while the original style throttle and foot pedals would be retained.

The games would be served from a console running on a Macintosh Power PC platform, with all of the cockpits working on a Novell DOS 7.x running custom network applications to handle network traffic. Struggles with the TCP/IP network architecture and the Division Pixel Planes technology would force development delays.

Red Planet would be the launch title for Tesla System 4 in 1996. It would be deployed first at Le Monde Virtuel in Montreal, Canada, followed by the Chicago BattleTech Center and the Indianapolis Virtual World Center. Design issues with Tesla BattleTech would force it to be released nearly 6 months after Red Planet.

Tesla System BattleTech & Red Planet would both feature a full, mission review in 3rd person mode following the action. Since this would not be time accelerated, the entire experience would be a 5 minute training video, 10 minutes of gameplay, and 10 minutes of mission review with score sheets as well.

Tesla System 4 saw the development of 3 unreleased titles by VWE. "Hull Pressure", the submarine game originally envisioned for System 3, had transitioned into a “Mission to Atlantis” which was an on-rails rescue game. “Mission to Atlantis” was previewed for the 1996 SiGGraph trade show but never moved past that stage of development. “Caverns” was an underground exploration game that was originally designed to be a persistent game world that could be modified and explored simultaneously by players at different VWE sites. Development never moved past basic environment proof of concept. The final title, “Corsairs” was to be the long sought after air-combat game for VWE. Basic game design and initial art was developed, but the game never moved to full development. Assets were shared by FASA, and the game was released as the pen and paper “Crimson Skies” game, and would later be developed on PC and Xbox. Cockpit software development at VWE would be suspended until the next generation of cockpit hardware would be ready, Minor software releases of new maps for Red Planet and new BattleMechs for BattleTech would be the only software releases until 2002.

=== Tesla II: Firestorm ===
In 2002, VWE began the process of upgrading the hardware inside the Tesla cockpits. Partnering with Microsoft, Alienware, and GameLeap, a new generation of hardware and software began to be deployed. The Alienware hardware was centered on supporting the MechWarrior 4:Mercenaries package that was the basis of the BattleTech:Firestorm software package. BattleTech:Firestorm would support a console that would also be PC based, removing Apple Macintosh computers from the VWE cockpit system for the first time in more than 10 years.

With Division Ltd. Pixel Plane cards no longer in the PC’s, “Red Planet” was removed from the game lineup.

"Red Planet" would return to Tesla II:Firestorm cockpits in 2012, with the original game ported to run using the Alienware hardware.

=== Locations ===
The first BattleTech Center opened in North Pier Mall in Chicago in 1990, with others in Yokohama following in August 1992 and Tokyo in 1993. Eventually, 26 such facilities were built and included other game types and more elaborate operations. These new locations were called 'Virtual World'. Each Virtual World site featured at least 16 networked "pods" designed in part by Frog Design. In 1991, Computer and Video Games called Battletech "definitely the most exciting interactive videogame system yet devised." It was also featured in Discovery Channel's Beyond 2000.

By 1993, patrons could compete against players in other centers across the country. Red Planet was the first non-BattleTech game added, and involved racing through the mining tunnels of Mars using vectored thrust mining hover-crafts. However, rapid advances in arcade games and online games meant that the Japanese Centers began closing in 1995, and by 2000 no BattleTech Centers remained operational in Japan.

In 1996, Virtual World Entertainment, INC and FASA Interactive Technologies merged and became wholly owned subsidiaries of Virtual World Entertainment Group (VWEG). In 1999, Microsoft Corporation purchased VWEG, sold VWE to a group headed by VWEG's former CFO, James Garbarini, and integrated FASA Interactive into the Microsoft Game Studios division. In 2005, all interest in VWE, LLC was sold to Nickolas 'PropWash' Smith and the principal offices were moved from Chicago to Kalamazoo, MI.

US Patent and Trademark Office: Virtually all patents and trademarks created in 1990 -1992 have expired, many in 2006. US Serial Number:74801563, US Registration Number:1910807 Date Cancelled: May 13, 2006 "Virtual World" US Serial Number:74108727, US Registration Number:1742513 Date Cancelled: Feb. 12, 2016 "VIRTUAL WORLD ENTERTAINMENT", VIRTUAL GEOGRAPHIC LEAGUE, VGL, RED PLANET and other associated trademarks. On March 10, 2011 USPTO transaction shows AUTOMATIC UPDATE OF ASSIGNMENT OF OWNERSHIP of assets by Smith to - Owner Name:3DCHAT.COM INC. Owner Address: 1150 HUNGRYNECK BLVD.MOUNT PLEASANT, SOUTH CAROLINA UNITED STATES 29464. March 17, 2023 the USPTO indicate any further PETITION TO DIRECTOR DISMISSED. 3dchat.com domain is 2 decades 7 years old, for sale.

Continuing Operations: In November 2005, an operator of the Virtual World Tesla II cockpits, MechCorps Entertainment, LLC, in Houston, Texas, USA opened to the public with eight Tesla II pods. They acquired another four pods in 2007, and hosted the 2007 National BattleTech Invitational in September 2007 with all 12 pods operational.

MechCorps Entertainment LLC, and VGCorps decided to refit existing Tesla II pods and take the BattleTech Center experience on the road in 2008. Gaming, sci-fi and anime conventions (including Comicpalooza, Oni-Con, MechaCon and Dragon Con) in the southern U.S. were introduced to MechCorps' Mobile Armor Division while Virtual World Entertainment in association with MechJock LLC made appearances in the Mid-West at events including Gencon, Origins, ACEN and Youmacon.

In 2006, hardcore players in Japan purchased four Tesla pods from the U.S., and began to put together a Virtual World Center in Tokyo. Despite many key components becoming 'Lostech' and their spare parts no longer available in market, the pods are now semi-operational, though no commercial operation has resumed yet.

In June 2012, Mr. Biggs Family Fun Center closed and all assets were auctioned off. This included 12 Pods. Mr. Biggs (formerly Fat City) megaplex in Littleton, Colorado contracted with an individual that owned 12 Pods. Mr. Biggs sold the Megaplex and general operations to another business entity. The owner of the pods removed his assets and put them into storage. The 12 pods were publicly auctioned on eBay. Cite: https://pinside.com/pinball/community/pinsiders/tesla-ii/stories/battletech-firestorm-tesla-ii-pods-for-sale-set-of-12

In 2011, The Airlock in Kirkland, WA closed. Eight Tesla Simulators were transferred. The WA Secretary of State show the company as Better Than Life, LLC UBI 602957500 Status is currently "Inactive". The pods were used under agreement by the two Governor of the LLC.

Around 2011 there were 8 pods listed on Facebook at two private home-based arcades. The trend indicates that public Battletech sites are diminishing.

In 2017, Virtual World Entertainment, LLC. re-launched its website at www.mechjock.com indicating that cockpit development continues and updated software featuring 5.07d can be played in Houston, Grand Rapids, and Minneapolis.

In August 2018, BattleTech center and game store Big Kidz Games in Grand Rapids, MI permanently closed. The Podtracker lists these pods as being private and in control of the owner of the store.

The Fallout Shelter Arcade closed its Taft St. location in February 2020, but continues to schedule convention attendances for the future.

MechCorps Entertainment LLC moved its Houston, TX, headquarters in July 2020 and remains open to the public. MechCorps also continues to bring Battletech Pods to conventions in the southern United States.

In 2022 One and a half of the Original Tesla 2 Pods were discovered in a warehouse in Canberra, Australia, which now reside as part of the Estate of Sara Elizabeth Joyce in the Blue Mountains.

== List of BattleTech centers ==
Center name	Location	Number and type of pods	Game(s) available	Venue
The Fallout Shelter Arcade	Twin Cities, Minnesota	12 Tesla II pods	BattleTech: Firestorm and Red Planet	Currently private due to COVID
MechCorps Entertainment LLC	Houston, Texas	18 Tesla II pods	BattleTech: Firestorm and Red Planet	Open to the public, co-located with Battlefield Houston laser tag center.

There are more cockpits in private hands not included in this list. Aug 2020 - Craig “Pharaoh” Evans in Denver Metro Area: YouTube Channel Tesla II cockpit ownership purchased from Hinkleys Family Center. https://www.youtube.com/channel/UCa4IQGzI2E6v7fn9GnVkaTA

== Reception ==
Lisa Stevens reviewed the Chicago BattleTech Center in White Wolf #23 (Oct./Nov., 1990), rating it a 5 out of 5 and stated that "Overall, I really enjoyed by experience at the BattleTech Center and recommend it heartily to anyone. The game itself is top-notch, providing more than enough action and adventure. The Center offers a look at the future of the entertainment industry and represents the leading edge of video arcade game design."
