= Dana Knutson =

American artist

- Known for: Fantasy art

Dana Knutson is an artist best known for his work on role-playing game products.

== Career ==
Dana Knutson has had a long career as an artist on role-playing games. He worked at FASA for 10 years, producing art on numerous works for their Star Trek and Shadowrun RPGs. He came to work for TSR in 1993 to produce artwork for the Dungeons & Dragons game, initially largely with the Planescape line. He created the Lady of Pain from one of his doodles. David "Zeb" Cook, designer of Planescape, explained Knutson's role in developing the setting: "It was at this early stage that I had my biggest idea - I needed an artist. I could think and write about these things, but the setting needed a look. [...] Foolishly, people believed in me, and Dana Knutson was assigned to draw anything I wanted. I babbled, and he drew - buildings, streets, characters and landscapes. Before any of us knew it, he drew the Lady of Pain. I'm very fond of the Lady of Pain; she really locks up the Planescape look. We all liked her so much that she became our logo." According to Shannon Appelcline, Planescape was "built around a strong artistic concept, thanks to Dana Knutson's conceptual art and Tony DiTerlizzi's final drawings". When TSR was purchased by Wizards of the Coast, he also illustrated cards for Magic: The Gathering.

== Reception ==
In his 2023 book Monsters, Aliens, and Holes in the Ground, RPG historian Stu Horvath reviewed Planescape and noted that Knutson was responsible for much of over-arching look and feel of the campaign setting, noting, "The art picks up where the words leave off. Planescape is the apex of the aesthetic-driven, high-concept Dungeons & Dragons setting. Dana Knutson developed all of the concept artwork for the setting, which Robh Ruppel turned into covers, and Tony DiTerlizzi used to fill out the interiors."
