= Sam Lewis (game designer) =

American game designer

Sam Lewis is an American designer of board games and former line developer of the Renegade Legion line in FASA Corporation. He was also president of FASA for a time.

== Background ==
He holds an MBA in economics from Northwestern University, which he obtained in 1983.

In 1983, he was credited as the designers of Mayfair Games' Dragonriders of Pern licensed game after a novel by Anne McCaffrey.

After Jordan Weisman founded the company which would become Virtual World Entertainment, Sam Lewis became president of FASA. By 1994, Renegade Legion had been dropped from production, and when Paul Lidberg - president of Crunchy Frog Enterprises - sought a full Battletech license from FASA, Lewis convinced Lidberg to license Renegade Legion instead.

For FASA, he created the individual combat game Battletroops in their Battletech game universe, and is credited for the adaption thereof under the name DMZ in the Shadowrun universe. Apart from that, he was responsible for the RL game line and their setting until FASA ended the line in 1995 and licensed the game world to Crunchy Frog Enterprises.

Afterwards, he did lead GameStorm, a service of Kesmai Corporation. Other works since then include production work for EA.com and design work for Sony Online Entertainment's Star Wars lines. He has also worked for Cartoon Network as lead game designer on the game FusionFall. Currently he is a senior game designer for ZeniMax Media
