= Jordan Weisman =

American video game designer

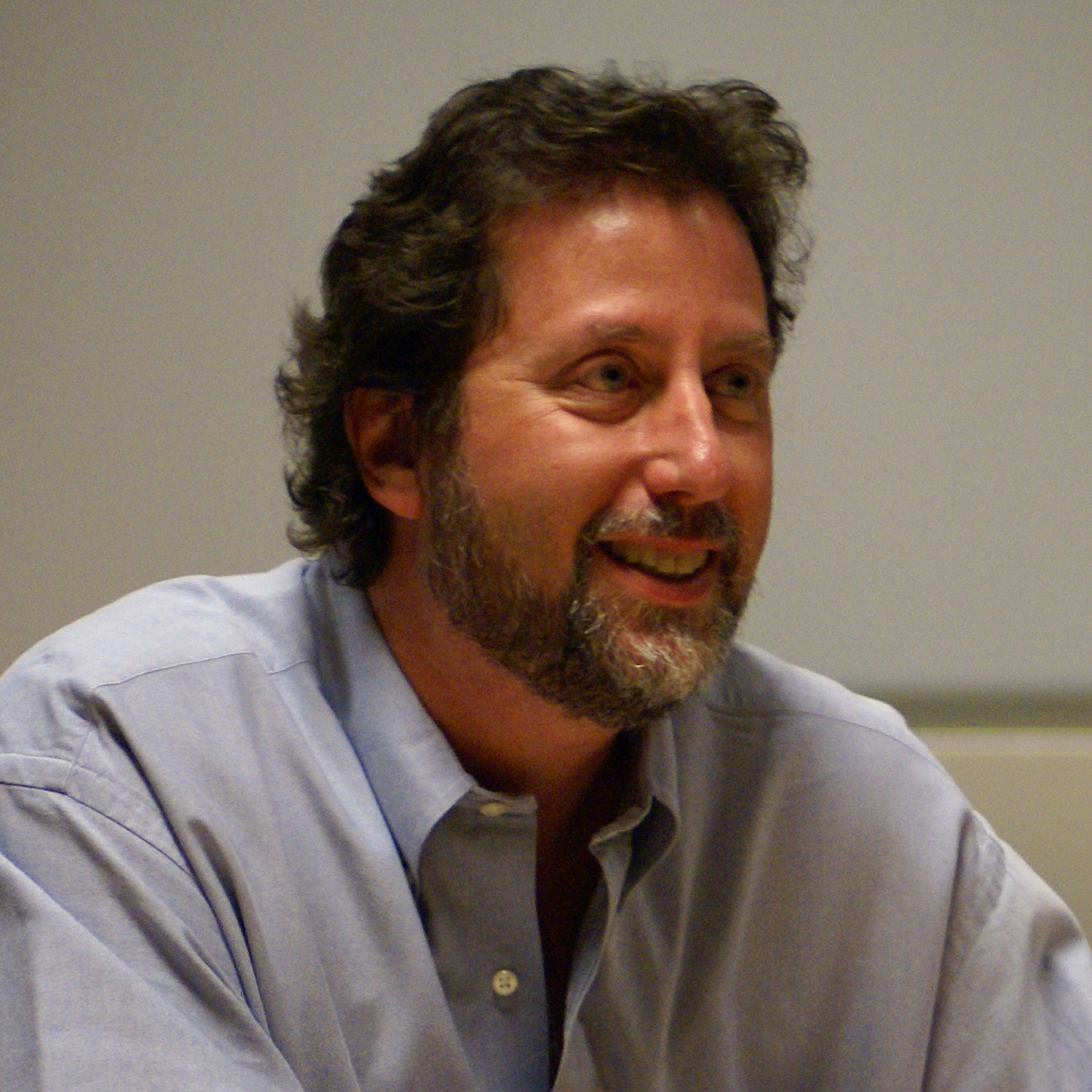
- Jordan Weisman at USC IMD in August 2006
- Born: 1960 (age 65–66)
- Occupations: Game designer author
- Known for: FASA Corporation; WizKids; Harebrained Schemes

Jordan Weisman (born 1960) is an American game designer, author, and serial entrepreneur who has founded five game design companies, each in a different game genre and segment of the industry.

== Early life ==
Weisman graduated from Francis W. Parker High School, in Chicago, Illinois. He went to the Merchant Marine Academy and briefly attended University of Illinois at Chicago, before leaving school to pursue his business interests.

== Career ==
In 1980, Weisman founded role playing game publisher FASA Corporation (short for the Freedonia Aeronautics & Space Administration, named after the fictional country in the Marx Brothers film Duck Soup) with partner L. Ross Babcock. Weisman and Babcock made a few hundred photocopies of the early adventures that Weisman wrote for the pen and paper role-playing game, Traveller, and sold the adventures to a local store in Chicago before sending them to nationwide distributors. Weisman started his business working out of his basement, and when he and Babcock wanted outside talent they brought William H. Keith Jr. and his brother J. Andrew Keith into the company from freelancing for Game Designers' Workshop. The first professional publication from the company was I.S.P.M.V Tethys (1980), a set of ship deckplans illustrated by Weisman. FASA agreed in August 1981 to publish the magazine High Passage, with Weisman and Babcock responsible for the layout and editing. Weisman wanted FASA to produce its own science-fiction roleplaying game, so he and Babcock secured the rights in 1982 to produce their own Star Trek: The Role Playing Game which was published in 1983. FASA published a game involving battling mechanoids called Combots (1983), by Weisman and Fawcett. FASA later produced the successful BattleTech and Shadowrun franchises.

In 1987, Weisman and his father Morton Weisman founded Environmental Simulations Project — later renamed Virtual Worlds Entertainment — the company that produced the BattleTech Centers. Working with Incredible Technologies, VWE created the world's first immersive networked location-based virtual reality gaming centers. VWE was a critical, though not a commercial success. As Weisman got more involved in VWE, Sam Lewis became FASA's president.

In 1995, Weisman founded FASA Interactive with Denny Thorley and Morton Weisman to personally take over the development and production of the hit MechWarrior PC games; as part of this arrangement, the tabletop role-playing company FASA Corporation provided a license to the computer game company FASA Interactive for its game properties in exchange for stock in the company. The franchise is one of the top-selling PC games of all time, with sales of over 9 million units worldwide.

Microsoft acquired both Virtual World Entertainment Group and FASA Interactive on January 7, 1999; Microsoft sold Virtual World to some of its developers, while Microsoft rebranded FASA Interactive as FASA Studio. Babcock and Weisman went to work for Microsoft, with Weisman becoming the Creative Director of Microsoft games from 1999 to 2002. While working at Microsoft, Weisman and his unit created a new genre of interactive entertainment called alternative reality games, and developed the alternate reality game "The Beast", to promote the Steven Spielberg film A.I.

Weisman had been developing a computer game design called Corsairs!, which took place in the United States of an alternate universe, and he arranged for FASA Corporation to publish the board game Crimson Skies (1998) with the intend of increasing the value of computer game.

In 2000, he founded WizKids, with his miniatures games involving the "clix" style of miniature figure that contained a dial that can be turned to show the statistics for each figure. WizKids produced the games Mage Knight, HeroClix, and Pirates of the Spanish Main. WizKids grew rapidly and went from start-up to over $30M in annual sales in just two years. The company focused on miniature figure games that are easy to learn for younger players. Weisman sold WizKids to Topps in 2003.

In 2003 he founded 42 Entertainment, a design company in the new field of the alternate reality game or ARGs. 42 has created multiple ARGs, including, "I Love Bees", to promote the Xbox game Halo 2, and "Year Zero" to promote the Nine Inch Nails album of the same name.

In 2006, his Cathy's Book, a novel with interactive elements co-written by Sean Stewart and illustrated by Cathy Brigg appeared from Running Press. The book was a best seller in Germany and sold over 100,000 copies in the USA.

In 2007, FASA Studio was closed and all of its FASA rights were licensed back to Weisman. In 2007 Weisman founded Smith & Tinker (named after the characters in The Wizard of Oz). Weisman relicensed his FASA properties through Smith & Tinker. Smith & Tinker licensed the electronic entertainment rights to Crimson Skies, Shadowrun, MechWarrior and other FASA properties that had belonged to Microsoft.

The same year Weisman co-founded the start-up Fyreball with Pete Parsons (formerly of Bungie and currently serves on the Board of Advisors along with Ed Fries). The company is now operating under the name Meteor Solutions.

On May 27, 2009 Weisman's Smith & Tinker announced their first game had been released to public beta. This was Nanovor, an online battle game targeted to 7-12 year olds. However, it was not a success, and was closed down in December 2010. Smith & Tinker closed down November 8, 2012.

On June 9, 2009 Weisman and J.C. Hutchins released Personal Effects: Dark Art (Griffin). On the same day Weisman along with Russ Bullock announced that the MechWarrior franchise would be seeing a relaunch.

Jordan is currently an adjunct professor in the Interactive Media Division at the USC School of Cinema-Television. In 2012 he started to raise money, through Kickstarter, for Shadowrun Returns, a new video game adaptation of Shadowrun. His new company is Harebrained Schemes and they released their 3rd game Shadowrun Returns on July 25, 2013. Shortly after, on September 10, 2013, Jordan's company launched a Kickstarter for its first tabletop game, Golem Arcana. After successfully funding, Golem Arcana released the following year on August 13, 2014. On January 13, 2015, Harebrained Schemes launched another Kickstarter campaign to partially fund development their next Shadowrun game, Shadowrun: Hong Kong. Shadowrun Returns was in many top 10 lists for 2014 and several No 1s for RPGs that year. Shadowrun Hong Kong was in many top 10s lists in 2015 and several No. 1 RPGs for 2015. In 2015 HBS did a kickstarter for Battletech/MechWarrior another property created by Jordan Weisman. They raised just short of 3 million and the game was released on April 24, 2018.

In June 2018, it was announced and completed Harebrained's acquisition by Paradox Interactive for a fixed purchase price of US$7,500,000.

== Awards and honors ==
Weisman has won more than 100 awards, including election to the Hall of Fame by the Academy of Adventure Gaming Arts & Design. In 2003 he was selected as the Pacific Northwest Entrepreneur of the Year by Ernst & Young.

In 2022, The Peabody Awards announced a new category for digital and interactive storytelling, including legacy awards for notable projects. Weisman won for The Beast, along with Sean Stewart, Pete Fenlon, and Elan Lee.

== Design credits ==
Weisman's design credits in paper RPG and miniature game design include:

- The click base concept for miniature gaming, MageKnight, HeroClix, etc.
- Star Trek III: Starship Combat Game Box Set (1984)
- Battletech (1984)
- Shadowrun (1989) - game concept
- Earthdawn (1993) - game concept
- Crimson Skies (1998)
- MechWarrior: Dark Age (2002)
- Aerotech 2, Revised Ed. (BattleTech) (2004)
- Golem Arcana (2014)

He also served as production manager and/or graphic designer on a long series of titles, and is co-author with Sean Stewart of Cathy's Book, a young-adult novel with ARG components.
