= Jedko Games =

- Original logo (1973)
- Headquarters: Melbourne, Australia

Jedko Games is an Australian importer/wholesaler of games, jigsaws, playing cards, wooden toys, board games, traditional games and puzzles. It was originally a publisher of original games and Australian editions of overseas wargames.

== History ==
In 1968, John Edwards was visiting a friend in the United States and came across a copy of Avalon Hill's Akrika Korps. Edwards took the game home and, not knowing any other wargamers, played it solitaire for several months. In 1971, Edwards reached an agreement with Avalon Hill to become their Australian import agent, but Edwards soon realized that the Australian import tax of 52% made Afrika Korps unaffordable. To overcome this, Edwards designed his first professional game, The African Campaign, a game based on Afrika Korps, and founded the publishing company Jedko in 1973 to print and publish the game in Australia. Avalon Hill realized that the game was not a photocopy of Afrika Korps — Edwards had made enough substantive improvements that The African Campaign was now a different game. Edwards and Avalon Hill reached an agreement that Avalon Hill would print and distribute copies of The African Campaign in North America.

Edwards designed several other games which were also licensed for sale by Avalon Hill, including War at Sea (1975) and The Russian Campaign (1975).

Other games published by Jedko include an Australian edition of TSR's Dungeon!, Alan Jones Formula 1 Grand Prix Racing Game and Basic Training, an introductory wargame between World War II Australian and Japanese in New Guinea.

Brand names imported by Jedko Games includes Holdson (NZ), Jumbo (Netherlands), Piatnik (Austria), Gamewright (USA), Heye (Germany), Eurographics (Canada), Professor Puzzle (UK), Hanayama (Japan), Outset Media (Canada), Gibsons Games (UK), and more.
