= L. Ross Babcock III =

Game designer

- Occupation: Game designer

L. Ross Babcock III is a game designer who has worked primarily on role-playing games.

== Career ==
Jordan Weisman asked his friends in 1980 if anyone else would join him in starting a company to publish adventures and deckplans for Traveller, and L. Ross Babcock III had the money so together they formed FASA. Weisman and Babcock printed a few hundred copies of these early adventures by Weisman, and sold these copies to a local store in Chicago; shortly they began sending samples to distributors who in turn were soon selling copies to nationwide retailers. Babcock and Weisman knew of William H. Keith Jr. and Andrew Keith as freelancers who had their writing and art published in products by Game Designers' Workshop, and they brought the Keith brothers into FASA as its first recruits in 1980. FASA agreed in August 1981 to publish the magazine High Passage, for which Weisman and Babcock did both the layout and editing. Babcock helped design the role-playing game Behind Enemy Lines (1982). Weisman and Babcock obtained the license to create a Star Trek role-playing game, and looked outside the company for a Star Trek design team, and freelance group Fantasimulations Association ultimately created Star Trek: The Role Playing Game (1983) for FASA.

Babcock and Weisman went to work for Microsoft when FASA Interactive became FASA Studio for that company. Babcock became the final president of FASA in early 2000, overseeing the company as it was prepared to exit the tabletop publishing industry. Mort Weisman (father of Jordan) and Ross Babcock announced on January 25, 2001, that FASA would be closing down after publishing its last few products.
