= GM (magazine) =

UK magazine

- First issue: September 1988; 37 years ago
- Final issue Number: March 1990; 19
- Company: Croftward Publishing
- Country: United Kingdom

GM – The Independent Fantasy Roleplaying Magazine was first published in September 1988 by Croftward Publishing. The editorial team of Tim Metcalfe, Paul Boughton and Wayne worked together previously on Computer and Video Games magazine.

== History ==
GM ran for nineteen issues until March 1990 when Croftward Publishing went into liquidation. Metcalfe, Boughton and Wayne later became associate editors for GamesMaster International, published by Newsfield.

== Content ==
Content varied in each issue but normally covered a wide range of roleplaying activities including role-playing games (RPG), computer RPGs, play-by-mail, live action role-playing, board games, fantasy films, fantasy novels and solo roleplay books, miniature figures as well as scenarios, game playing hints and tips, short stories, interviews and much more.

Terry Pratchett's short story "Final Reward" was originally published in the October 1988 issue. Pratchett also contributed to the eleventh issue, in July 1989, in a section titled "Pratchett's Points", though how much of it was written by Pratchett himself is unclear. It included an eleven-page section about "Adventuring in the Discworld" by Kevin Puttick, a map of Ankh-Morpork (predating The Streets of Ankh-Morpork by four years), and an edited extract from Pyramids presented as a one-page short story called "The Test".

David Langford was a regular contributor with his book review column "Critical Hits", a continuation of the column he wrote for White Dwarf.
