= FASA =

American publisher of role-playing games, wargames and board games

FASA Corporation
- Industry: Wargaming; Role-playing games
- Founded: 1980; 46 years ago
- Defunct: April 30, 2001 (active operations only)
- Fate: Original business defunct; Rights for BattleTech and Shadowrun split between Topps and Microsoft Gaming; Returned publishing games through FASA Games in 2012
- Headquarters: Chicago, Illinois, U.S.
- Key people: Jordan Weisman; L. Ross Babcock
- Products: Crimson Skies; Renegade Legion; VOR: The Maelstrom; Earthdawn; Battletech; Shadowrun; Demonworld; Star Trek: The Role Playing Game; The Doctor Who Role Playing Game
- Website: www.fasa.com at the Wayback Machine (archived July 13, 2001)

FASA Games, Inc.
- Industry: Wargaming; Role-playing games
- Founded: June 14, 2012; 13 years ago
- Headquarters: Chicago, Illinois, U.S.
- Key people: Jordan Weisman; L. Ross Babcock
- Products: Crimson Skies; Renegade Legion; VOR: The Maelstrom; Earthdawn; Battletech; Shadowrun; Demonworld
- Website: fasagames.com

FASA Corporation was an American publisher of role-playing games, wargames and board games between 1980 and 2001, after which they closed publishing operations for several years, becoming an IP holding company under the name FASA Inc. In 2012, a wholly owned subsidiary called FASA Games Inc. went into operation, using the name and logo under license from the parent company. FASA Games Inc. works alongside Ral Partha Europe, also a subsidiary of FASA Corporation, to bring out new editions of existing properties such as Earthdawn and Demonworld, and to develop new properties within the FASA cosmology.

FASA first appeared as a Traveller licensee, producing supplements for that Game Designers' Workshop role-playing game, especially the work of the Keith Brothers. The company went on to establish itself as a major gaming company with the publication of the Star Trek RPG, then several successful original games. Noteworthy lines included BattleTech and Shadowrun. Their Star Trek role-playing supplements and tactical ship game enjoyed popularity outside the wargaming community since, at the time, official descriptions of the Star Trek universe were not common, and the gaming supplements offered details fans craved.

The highly successful BattleTech line led to a series of video games, some of the first virtual reality gaming suites, called Virtual World (created by a subdivision of the company known at the time of development as ESP, an acronym for "Extremely Secret Project") and a Saturday-morning animated TV series.

Originally, the name FASA was an acronym for "Freedonian Aeronautics and Space Administration", a joking allusion to the Marx Brothers film Duck Soup. This tongue-in-cheek attitude was carried over in humorous self-references in its games. For example, in Shadowrun, a tactical nuclear device was detonated near FASA's offices at 1026 W. Van Buren St in Chicago, Illinois.

== History ==
FASA Corporation logo in 1983

FASA Corporation was founded by Jordan Weisman and L. Ross Babcock III in 1980 with a starting capital of $350 ($1,200 adjusted for inflation). The two were fellow gamers at the United States Merchant Marine Academy. Mort Weisman, Jordan's father, joined the company in 1985 to lead the company's operational management, having sold his book publishing business, Swallow Press.

Under the new commercial direction and with Mort's capital injection, the company diversified into books and miniature figures. After consulting their UK distributor, Chart Hobby Distributors, FASA licensed the manufacture of its BattleTech figurines to the British company Minifigs. FASA would later acquire the U.S. figures manufacturer Ral Partha, which was the licensed American manufacturer of Minifigs. While Mort ran the paper and metal based sides of the business, the company's founders focused on the development of computer-based games. They were particularly interested in virtual reality (particularly the BattleTech Centers / Virtual World) but also developed desktop computer games.

When Microsoft acquired the FASA Interactive subsidiary, Babcock went with that company. After the sale of Virtual World, Jordan turned his attention to the founding of a new games venture called WizKids.

== Current status and intellectual property ==
FASA unexpectedly ceased active operations on April 30, 2001, but still exists as a corporation holding intellectual property rights, which it licenses to other publishers. Contrary to popular belief, the company did not go bankrupt. Allegedly, the owners decided to quit while the company was still financially sound in a market they perceived as going downhill. Mort Weisman had been talking of retirement for some years, and his confidence in the future of the paper-based games business was low. He considered the intellectual property of FASA to be of high value, but did not wish to continue working as he had been for the last decade or more. Unwilling to wrestle with the complexities of dividing up the going concern, the owners issued a press release on January 25, 2001, announcing the immediate closure of the business.

The BattleTech and Shadowrun properties were sold to WizKids, who in turn licensed their publication to FanPro LLC and then to Catalyst Game Labs. The Earthdawn license was sold to WizKids, and then back to FASA. Living Room Games published Earthdawn (Second Edition), RedBrick published Earthdawn (Classic and Third Editions), but the license has now returned to FASA Corporation, and FASA Games, Inc. is the current license holder for new material. Crimson Skies was originally developed by Zipper Interactive under the FASA Interactive brand in late 2000 and used under license by FASA; FASA Interactive had been purchased by Microsoft, so rights to Crimson Skies stayed with Microsoft. Rights to the miniatures game VOR: The Maelstrom reverted to the designer Mike "Skuzzy" Nielsen, but it has not been republished in any form due partly to legal difficulties. Microsoft officially closed the FASA team in the company's gaming division on September 12, 2007.

On December 6, 2007, FASA founder Jordan Weisman announced that his new venture, Smith & Tinker, had licensed the electronic gaming rights to MechWarrior, Shadowrun, and Crimson Skies from Microsoft.

On April 28, 2008, Mike "Skuzzy" Nielsen announced plans to create Vor 2.0.

At Gen Con 2012, FASA Games, Inc. was revealed, which includes FASA Corporation co-founder Ross Babcock on the board of directors. While FASA Corporation still owns and manages the FASA IP and brands, FASA Games, Inc would release new games and content. As of 2020, FASA Games has released contents for 2 games; a 4th edition for Earthdawn and the new game 1879 which aims to replace and/or create an alternate future '6th Age' in 'replacement' to Shadowrun.

== Notable games ==
=== Role-playing games ===
- Star Trek: The Role Playing Game (1982)
- Star Trek: Starship Tactical Combat Simulator
- Doctor Who (1985)
- MechWarrior (1986)
- Shadowrun (1989)
- Legionnaire (1990)
- Earthdawn (1993)

=== Board games ===
- BattleTech (released in 1984 as BattleDroids, titled BattleTech as of 1985)
  - Battledroids (1984)
  - Classic BattleTech (1985)
- Renegade Legion (1989)
- Crimson Skies (1998)

=== Miniature games ===
- VOR: The Maelstrom (1999)
- Demonworld (second edition: 2011, miniatures by Ral Partha Europe. The first edition was released in 1999 by Hobby Products)

=== Video games ===
- See FASA Studio
