= Carole Ruggier =

British/Irish/American actress (born 1967)

- Born: Carole J. Ruggier; March 20, 1967 (age 58); Lambeth, London, England
- Education: Arts Educational Schools
- Occupations: Actress; voice director; voice actress; writer
- Years active: 1985–present
- Spouse: Bryan Bowen (m. 1987)

Carole Ruggier (born March 20, 1967) is a British/Irish/American actress, casting director and voice actress, known for her work on award winning video games. Notable voice roles include MechWarrior, Tom Clancy's Rainbow Six, Rogue Spear, Athena in God of War (2005) and God of War II (2007) with a cameo in 2018's God of War, as well as Athena in Age of Mythology and Auntie Dot in Halo: Reach. TV roles include playing Amanda Carter, mother of Peggy Carter and Michael Carter, in Agent Carter episode "Smoke & Mirrors", and multiple voice and sketch appearances on Jimmy Kimmel Live on ABC.

== Career ==
Ruggier trained as an actress in London and worked extensively in theatre in leading and character roles. Productions include Julius Caesar, Twelfth Night, The Cherry Orchard, The Accrington Pals by Peter Whelan, The Card adapted by Joyce Holliday, Outskirts by Hanif Kureshi, Stags and Hens by Willy Russell, Trafford Tanzi, Good Golly, Miss Molly, I Don't Want to Set the World on Fire, Lady Audley's Secret, The Country Wife, The Wizard of Oz, Chicago, Gypsy, and The Threepenny Opera. In the United States, play roles include The Secret Rapture by David Hare, Disneyland It Ain't by Sue Townsend, Chamber Music by Arthur Kopit, Mary Barnes by Mary Barnes and David Edgar, and Alfie by Bill Naughton. She has produced plays in London, Florida, and Los Angeles, including Take 5, Beached, Disneyland It Ain't, Cochon Flambe, Solos in Harmony, and Nagasaki Dust.

Her first TV role was as a policewoman in Tucker's Luck BBC TV, followed by Life Without George and two BBC TV mini-series Love and Reason, starring Phyllis Logan, and Campion: Death of a Ghost, starring Peter Davison. TV appearances in the US include Jimmy Kimmel Live, Oh Baby, No Greater Love, It's a Miracle, and Arrest & Trial. She appeared as Peggy Carter's mother, Amanda, in Agent Carter for ABC, set in the Marvel Cinematic Universe. Films include Living Out Loud directed by Richard LaGravenese, Reeker, Love on the Line, Blackmail, Abruptio, Wonderland it Ain't, Dallas Biters Club, and American Snapper. She co-produced the short film, Wonderland It Ain't, co-wrote Dallas Biters Club and in 2015, wrote, produced, and directed the parody, American Snapper.

Her first role as a voice actress was in the 1995 video game MechWarrior 2 as the Narrator (aka Bitchin' Betty) and she was invited to reprise the role for MechWarrior Online in 2013. In 2002, she voiced Professor Jocelyn Peabody in the 26-episode animated TV series Dan Dare: Pilot of the Future.

Casting director credits include games such as Red Dead Revolver, Quake II, Devil May Cry 2, Quantum Redshift, Summoner 2, Red Faction 2, Age of Mythology, Maximo: Ghost to Glory, Steel Battalion, Conquest: Frontier Wars, Crimson Skies, StarLancer, Heavy Gear, and several Tom Clancy games, including Ghost Recon, The Sum of All Fears, Rogue Spear, and Rainbow Six.

In 2002, Ruggier voiced the character of the Greek goddess Athena in the game Age of Mythology. She would voice the character again, but a different version for a different game for which she is best known. This was for the God of War series, which was originally based on Greek mythology. Her first role as Athena in the series was in the first game, God of War (2005); she also provided the voice of the goddess Aphrodite, who was a main character in the game. Ruggier reprised Athena in the 2007 sequel God of War II. Erin Torpey voiced the role of Athena in God of War III; however, Ruggier did return to the franchise for the character's cameo appearance in 2018's God of War. She also voiced the Geologist in Jak and Daxter: The Precursor Legacy. Before voicing Auntie Dot in Halo: Reach, Ruggier had only heard of the Halo series, but did not know what it was about until her husband "filled [her] in". She also cast and directed the voices for the games Freelancer, Dino Crisis 3, Devil May Cry 2, Chaos Legion, Combat Flight Simulator 2, and the GameCube remake of Resident Evil.

== Personal life ==
She is married to award winning Supervising Sound Editor Bryan Bowen and the couple lives in Los Angeles, California.

== Filmography ==
=== Television series ===
Year	Title	Role	Notes
1985	Tucker's Luck	Policewoman	S3. Episode: 6
1988	Life Without George	Debbie	S2. Episode: 4
1989	Campion	Rosa	Episode: Death of a Ghost
1993	Love and Reason	Lynn Hegley / Jenny Hegley	S1. Episode 1 & Episode: 2
1999	Oh Baby	Babysitter	Episode: Baby Shower
2000	Arrest & Trial	Laura Almanza	Episode: Texas Seven
2002	It's a Miracle	Marian Shergold	Episode: Miracle of the Cards
2009	Jimmy Kimmel Live! Season 8	BP Executive	Episode: 156
2011	Jimmy Kimmel Live! Season 9	Nobel Prize announcer	Episode: 110
2013	Shazza	Natalie's mum	Episode: La Dee Da
2016	Agent Carter	Amanda Carter	Episode: Smoke & Mirrors
2016	The Process	Cheryl Jones	S1. Episode: 2
2017	Jimmy Kimmel Live! Season 15	Newsreader	Episode: 68
2018	Rachel VA	Mother	Voice
2018	Jimmy Kimmel Live! Season 16	Nobel Peace Prize presenter	Episode: 16
2018	The Young and the Restless	Susan Wade	S1. Episode: 11380
2019	Jimmy Kimmel Live! Season 17	Nobel Prize announcer	Episode: 13
2019	Gods of Food	House Doctor	Episode: The Sad Baker

=== Animation ===
List of voice performances in animation
Year	Title	Role(s)	Notes
2002	Dan Dare: Pilot of the Future	Professor Jocelyn Peabody	26 episodes

=== Film ===
Year	Title	Role	Notes
1996	No Greater Love	Carpathia Stewardess	
1998	The Disturbance at Dinner	Mrs. Facinelli	
1998	Living Out Loud	Italian Girlfriend	
2000	Wonderland... It Ain't	Maureen	Short
2000	Bathory	Anna Durvulia	Short
2001	Dan Dare: Pilot of the Future	Professor Jocelyn Peabody	
2005	Reeker	The Mom	
2013	Brests of the Southland Wild	Wanda	Short
2013	Red 2	Carole	Voice
2014	Dallas Biters Club	Dr. Eve Jennaffleck	Short
2014	The Box	Helen	Short
2015	American Snapper	Butch	Short
2017	Blackmail	Nurse Potter	
2020	Love on the Line	Stephanie	
2022	Without Ward	Beverly Gault	
2022	The Impact	Caller	
2023	Abruptio	Doreen Hackel	

=== Video games ===
List of voice performances in video games
Year	Title	Role	Notes
1995	MechWarrior 2: 31st Century Combat	Betty / Narrator / Mission Briefing	PC
1995	MechWarrior 2: Ghost Bear's Legacy	Narrator	PC
1996	Spycraft: The Great Game	InteLink	PC
1997	Heavy Gear	Narrator	PC
1998	Tom Clancy's Rainbow Six	Narrator	PC
1999	Battlezone II: Combat Commander	Betty	PC
1999	Tom Clancy's Rainbow Six: Rogue Spear	Narrator	PC
2000	Crimson Skies	Radio voice / Airplane fighter / Various additional voices	PC
2000	Combat Flight Simulator 2	Additional voices	PC
2000	Timeline	Automaton / Village Woman 2	PC
2000	Tom Clancy's Rainbow Six: Rogue Spear: Mission Pack: Urban Operations	Narrator	PC
2001	Jak and Daxter: The Precursor Legacy	Geologist	PlayStation 2
2001	Tom Clancy's Ghost Recon	Narrator	Xbox
2002	The Sun of All Fears	Female Team Member	PC
2002	Resident Evil	Female Newscaster / Zombies	GameCube
2002	Tom Clancy's Ghost Recon: Desert Siege	Computer voice / Additional voices	PlayStation 2
2002	Tom Clancy's Ghost Recon: Island Thunder	Narrator	PC
2002	Red Faction II	Female 3	PlayStation 2
2002	Age of Mythology	Athena	macOS
2002	The Lord of the Rings: The Two Towers	Eowyn	PlayStation 2
2003	Chaos Legion	Legions / Monsters	PlayStation 2
2003	Devil May Cry 2	Additional voices	PlayStation 2
2003	Freelancer	Announcer / Additional voices	PC
2003	Dino Crisis 3	Ozymandias passengers / Computer voice / Additional voices	Xbox
2003	Tom Clancy's Rainbow Six 3: Raven Shield	Additional voices	PlayStation 2
2003	Pulse Racer	Female Computer	Xbox
2004	Tom Clancy's Ghost Recon: Jungle Storm	Narrator	PlayStation 2
2004	Tom Clancy's Rainbow Six 3: Athena Sword	Additional voices	Mac OS X
2005	Tom Clancy's Rainbow Six 3: Iron Wrath	Additional voices	PC
2005	God of War	Athena / Aphrodite	PlayStation 2
2007	God of War II	Athena	PlayStation 2
2010	Halo: Reach	Auntie Dot	Xbox One
2010	Dante's Inferno	Narrator / Francesca de Polenta	PlayStation 3
2011	The Elder Scrolls V: Skyrim	Bralsa Drel / Dreyla Alor	Xbox 360
2011	Halo: Combat Evolved Anniversary	Auntie Dot	Xbox 360
2012	The Elder Scrolls V: Skyrim – Dragonborn	Elynea Mothren / Miner / Mireli / Pirate / Treasure Hunter	Xbox 360
2013	Jak and Daxter Collection	Geologist	PlayStation 3
2013	MechWarrior Online	Narrator / Betty	PC
2014	Halo: The Master Chief Collection	Auntie Dot	Xbox One
2018	God of War	Athena	PlayStation 4
2024	MechWarrior 5: Clans	Betty	PlayStation 5
2024	Age of Mythology: Retold	Athena	PlayStation 5

== Awards and nominations ==
Year	Award	Category	Nominated Work	Result
2004	Golden Reels Awards	Voice Direction	Video Game	Nominated
2004	Golden Reels Awards	Voice Direction on Video Game	Freelancer	Won
2014	The Toscars Awards	Best Supporting Whactress	Dallas Biters Club	Nominated
2014	The Toscars Awards	Best Scribbler (Writer)	Dallas Biters Club	Nominated
2015	The Toscars Awards	Best Scribbler (Screenplay)	American Snapper	Nominated
2015	The Toscars Awards	Best Supporting Whactress	American Snapper	Nominated
2015	The Toscars Awards	Best Parody	American Snapper	Nominated
2015	The Toscars Awards	Best Dictator (Director)	American Snapper	Nominated
