= MechWarrior (disambiguation) =

MechWarrior is a series of video games set in the fictional universe of BattleTech.

MechWarrior may also refer to:

- MechWarrior (role-playing game), a 1986 role-playing game set in the BattleTech universe
- MechWarrior (1989 video game), the first game in the MechWarrior video game series
- MechWarrior (SNES video game), 1993 video game for the Super Nintendo Entertainment System
- MechWarrior, or MechWarrior Online, an online video game reboot of the series
