= MechWarrior 5: Mercenaries =

- Developer: Piranha Games
- Publishers: Fireshine Games; Piranha Games
- Designers: David Forsey; Paul Inouye
- Programmer: Brian Windover
- Artist: Dennis de Koning
- Composer: Sean Kolton
- Series: MechWarrior
- Engine: Unreal Engine 4
- Platforms: Microsoft Windows; Xbox One; Xbox Series X/S; PlayStation 4; PlayStation 5
- Release: Microsoft Windows; December 10, 2019; Xbox One, Series X/S; May 27, 2021; PlayStation 4, PS5; September 23, 2021
- Genre: Vehicle simulation
- Modes: Single-player, multiplayer

MechWarrior 5: Mercenaries is a BattleTech mecha game developed by Piranha Games released on December 10, 2019, on Microsoft Windows. It is the first single player MechWarrior game since 2002. It was initially available as an Epic Games Store exclusive title, which, like other games with Epic Games Store exclusivity deals, was met with criticism. On May 7, 2020, it was made available through Xbox Game Pass for PC. On May 27, 2021, it was made available on additional platforms including Xbox Series X/S, Xbox One, Steam and GOG, in addition to the DLC pack Heroes of the Inner Sphere, Call to Arms, and Rise of Rasalhague. The game has sold two million units as of October 2024. Piranha Games released a sequel, MechWarrior 5: Clans, on October 16, 2024.

== Synopsis ==
MechWarrior 5: Mercenaries is set in the BattleTech universe. The game starts in 3015 during the final decade of the Third Succession War, casting the player as a rookie mercenary MechWarrior rising from the ashes of a demolished mercenary unit. They are able to accept contracts from the various factions available in this time period. The campaign goes all the way up to 3049, just before the Clan Invasion.

== Plot ==
The player takes the role of "Commander Mason", the only son of Nikolai Mason, commanding officer of Nik's Cavaliers, a small mercenary outfit whose home base is on the Federated Suns world of De Berry in 3015. Having come of age and taking a rebuilt 'Centurion' model BattleMech through its paces with his father, this training mission is interrupted by a surprise attack by a mysterious mercenary unit demanding information from Nikolai. Refusing to divulge mysterious coordinates that they seek, Nikolai orders his son to return to base and flee aboard the unit's DropShip, sacrificing his life to ensure their escape.

Reduced to just two BattleMechs, Mason and the survivors of the Cavaliers (Ryana Campbell, the operations officer, and Fahad Arazad, the chief technician) reach out to Sebastian Spears, a high level agent of the company Interstellar Expeditions and a long-term friend of his father who provides assistance in escaping the system. Using a re-used mercenary registration number to mask their origins, Commander Mason must rebuild his command to locate and defeat his enemies and avenge his father, as well as uncover the secret his father took to his grave.

As Mason completes missions over time, Nik's Cavaliers' reputation grows and they build up a company of progressively stronger 'Mechs with veteran pilots. After leaving Federated Suns space for the Free World's League in search of leads, they finally learn the name of the mercenary outfit who attacked them: Black Inferno. Through a series of skirmishes against Black Inferno taking place from the Free World's League to the Lyran Commonwealth, Mason finds out that there are in fact two people responsible for his father's death: Andreas Kane, leader of Black Inferno (who killed Nikolai), and Kenzo Yamata, who gave the order. Yamata is a high-ranking member of the immensely powerful and secretive company ComStar: controllers of virtually all interstellar communication, and Black Inferno's benefactor.

At Spear's recommendation, Nik's Cavaliers raid Black Inferno's repair and salvage base for stronger 'Mechs in preparation for an attack on Black Inferno's stronghold. Zavarov, an elite officer of Black Inferno, pilots Nikolai's 'Victor' 'Mech as a form of psychological warfare against Mason. Mason kills her and retrieves his father's 'Mech. With enough firepower at last, Nik's Cavaliers launch an all-out attack on Black Inferno's final base. There, Mason faces off against Kane in his 'King Crab' 'Mech. Though Mason prevails and even destroys the entire Black Inferno base, Yamata escapes, using Kane as a distraction.

With Spear's help, Ryana manages to decipher a series of coordinates from Nikolai's 'Victor', leading them into uncharted space on the periphery of Draconis Combine space. They discover that the planets there are strewn with ancient lost technology (known as LosTech) that ComStar wishes to exploit. With their target now switching from Black Inferno to ComStar, Mason captures and destroys ComStar outposts on several planets. Finally, Yamata himself arrives in his LosTech 'Annihilator' 'Mech to deal with Mason once and for all. After a hard-fought battle, Mason defeats Yamata. Immediately afterwards, Fahad relays that Nikolai's 'Victor' is sending a signal to a secret 'Mech bay nearby. There, they uncover a LosTech 'Mech called a 'Nightstar'.

Through an audio log in the 'Nightstar', Mason and his allies realize that the immensely powerful 'Mech belonged to Nikolai. He hid it decades ago to avoid rousing suspicion on his origins, as that 'Mech model had not been seen in the Inner Sphere of known space for over two centuries. Moreover, 'Nikolai Mason' was an identity he adopted for a spy mission in the Inner Sphere. Reaching the final set of coordinates that Nikolai left behind, Nik's Cavaliers and Interstellar Expeditions arrive at a massive underground base with a treasure-trove of LosTech. It is conspicuously marked with a red star emblem reminiscent of the Star League Defense Force (an ancient military that protected the Inner Sphere and who disappeared hundreds of years ago). ComStar catches up to them, sending waves of BattleMechs to destroy them and secure the LosTech for themselves. With nowhere left to run, Nik's Cavaliers make a last stand, as Ryana retrieves all the LosTech data of the base before Nik's Cavaliers escape on their DropShip.

Mason finally understands that his father originated from an unknown region of space beyond the Inner Sphere. However, his arrival was detected by ComStar. Knowing that he had access to LosTech, ComStar tracked him for years before finally sending Black Inferno to attack him at the beginning of the game. Nik's Cavaliers hand over the data to Spears, who promises that Interstellar Expeditions would use it for the betterment of the Inner Sphere. Having avenged his father's death and solved the mystery of the coordinates at last, Mason is finally at peace. Ryana and Fahad speculate that Nikolai's people will one day arrive in the Inner Sphere.

== Production ==
Following the 2002 release of MechWarrior 4: Mercenaries, FASA Studio had been developing Mechwarrior 5. However, it was cancelled in March 2003, due to "not advancing the genre enough to meet and exceed our customer's expectations."

Mechwarrior 5: Mercenaries was officially revealed in an early alpha stage during Piranha Games' annual MechCon show in December 2016, where Russ Bullock, the CEO of Piranha Games did a live demonstration showcasing the game with a hangar, a Shadowhawk mech, and combat against an AI-piloted Raven mech. The game was to be developed in Unreal Engine 4, thereby departing from Mechwarrior Online's use of CryEngine, but still using existing assets from Mechwarrior: Online, such as the mech models. The game was underway in preproduction for a while with a teaser at the following MechCon in December 2017 that showcased the dropship hangar, destructible buildings, VTOLs as enemies, and the main story premise of the player protagonist taking on the mantle of presiding over their parents' mercenary company. In 2018, Piranha Games marketed the game with an emphasis on its procedurally generated missions based on different biomes. At the annual Mechcon in December 2018, Piranha Games set up four customized 'Super Pods' that allowed VIP guests to play a demo of Mechwarrior 5: Mercenaries. This demo was also played and live-streamed by Piranha Games' employees and then accompanied with a release date trailer aiming for a release in 2019. On PC, it features ray tracing as well as DLSS.

=== Pre-order campaign and Epic Game Store exclusivity ===
In January 2019, Piranha Games unveiled the pre-order for Mechwarrior 5: Mercenaries called the Community Edition that enabled fans to preorder the game and receive a set of digital extras for the game (manuals, mech skins, soundtrack) as well as in-game currency and new mech chassis in Mechwarrior: Online. On the website, Piranha Games specified that those who preordered would receive a Steam or GOG key. This Community Edition generated around 20.000 preorders of the game. Later in June 2019, Piranha Games revealed that they had agreed with Epic Games on Mechwarrior 5: Mercenaries becoming a launch exclusive on their online digital store Epic Games Store, thereby going back on the promise of Steam and GOG copies to those who had preordered, as stipulated in the Community Edition. As a way to make amends, Piranha Games allowed for full refunds for anyone dissatisfied with the Epic Games Store exclusivity and allowed refunding customers to keep their extra bonus content for Mechwarrior: Online. Only 700 of the 20.000 customers who preordered chose to ask for a refund. Piranha Games stated that the Epic Games Store exclusivity resulted in extra funds that enabled them to hire more developers to improve game, such as lighting and story. The release on December 10, 2019, was accompanied by a range of media resources, including a free novella by Battletech author Randall Bills and a printable 'PC Big Box art' cutout to follow in the tradition of the previous Mechwarrior games and their older mode of physical distribution.

=== DLC1: Heroes of The Inner Sphere & Year One Update & Xbox release ===
After releasing the first version of Mechwarrior 5: Mercenaries for the Epic Game Store on December 10, 2019, Piranha Games proceeded to work further on more content and general quality-of-life updates for Mechwarrior 5: Mercenaries. Due to the COVID-19 pandemic and pivoting to remote development, the first downloadable content was pushed towards at the end of 2020. This coincided with the news that Piranha Games were to be acquired by the investor group EnadGlobal7 in November 2020. This acquisition put Piranha Games in touch with other companies within EnadGlobal7, such as the marketing companies Sold Out and Petrol, which suggested that the next DLC should be combined with not only the upcoming Steam and GOG release, but also an Xbox One/Xbox Series S/X console version that Piranha had been working on, thereby resulting in one major marketing push. This meant that Piranha Games combined the first DLC titled Heroes of the Inner Sphere with a major game update called 'Year One' and the Steam, GOG, and Xbox release in one single release on May 27, 2021. The Year One update included a range of quality of life improvements for the game, such as better AI, new sound effects, better graphical effects, a revamped introduction, and new cutscenes. Heroes of the Inner Sphere included new mission types, new mech chassis and variants, new biomes, and new tailored missions. This release saw a heavy marketing push with for example the E3 PC Gaming Show presented as taking place within the Mechwarrior universe.

=== DLC2: Kestrel Lancers and PlayStation release ===
While Heroes of the Inner Sphere had been worked on during 2020, Piranha Games had also worked on the second downloadable content for Mechwarrior 5: Mercenaries. This was unveiled in September 2021 alongside the announcement that Mechwarrior 5: Mercenaries would arrive on PlayStation 4 and PlayStation 5. This marked the first time in over 20 years that a Mechwarrior game had appeared on PlayStation since Mechwarrior 2: Arcade Edition in 1997, since Microsoft has owned the rights to all electronic instantiations of Battletech and Mechwarrior after acquiring FASA Interactive in January 1999. The Kestrel Lancers featured a new linear campaign set in the 4th Succession War, urban biomes, new mech variants, and its base game update included melee combat, new HUD, and lancemate switching. Its release was accompanied by a launch trailer depicting the wedding between Hanse-Davion and Melissa Steiner, a famous event in the Battletech fictional universe.

=== DLC3: Call to Arms ===
Released on 8 June 2022, this DLC added the Hatchetman mech and nine new melee weapons, as well as a mission quest line featuring the Independent People of Skye as employer.

=== DLC4: Rise of Rasalhague ===
On 30 November 2022 Piranha Games announced via their website that a fourth downloadable content for MechWarrior 5: Mercenaries would be released on January 26, 2023 known as Rise of Rasalhague alongside a free game update adding additional new in-game content; featuring a new questline in which players join the people of Rasalhague's fight for freedom and independence from the Great Houses. The DLC adds the Crusader mech, and "Rival Mercenaries" feature allowing you to interact with numerous other mercenary companies along with the infamous Bounty Hunter

=== DLC5: The Dragon's Gambit ===
On 26, July 2023, the 5th DLC was announced for MW5, The Dragon's Gambit to ship on 28 September 2023. This DLC takes place following the 4th Succession War, as The Draconis Combine attempts defend itself from the FedComm forces. The DLC will include 15 missions, a new Mech chassis, the Longbow, with 5 different versions of the chassis available, new special variants of existing Mechs, and the addition of multi-player and team combat mode for instant action missions.

=== DLC6: Solaris Showdown ===
On 14 March 2024, the 6th DLC for MW5: Mercenaries was released titled Solaris Showdown. The DLC brought back the fan-favorite voice actor George Ledoux to reprise his role as Duncan Fisher, a character that was previously established in Mechwarrior 4: Mercenaries. The DLC introduces new mission types and a smaller campaign focusing on the gladiator arena combat found in the Solaris 7 tournaments. The DLC also introduced the Roughneck mech and its different variants to the game.

=== DLC7: Shadow of Kerensky ===
On September 3rd, 2025, the seventh DLC for mercenaries was released. This DLC introduces both the faction of the Clans and the technology they bring with them including several mechs, weapons and other equipment. The plot for this DLC begins with the Commander hunting pirates in the Free Rasalhague Republic, only to encounter Clan Wolf and being forced to flee the planet altogether. As they escape, both Mason and Ryana recognise the symbol used by the clans as the one found on the door of the facility from the final main campaign mission, leading them to retrace their steps with assistance from Interstellar Expeditions to find out more of the invaders before the entire Inner Sphere is overrun.

== Reception ==
Reception

Aggregate score
Aggregator	Score
Metacritic	74/100

Review scores
Publication	Score
Destructoid	8/10
GameRevolution	3/5
IGN	8.1/10
PC Gamer (US)	80/100

Edit on Wikidata

At launch, MechWarrior 5: Mercenaries received "mixed or average reviews" according to review aggregator Metacritic. Its initial sales on the Epic Games Store generated "hundreds of thousands" of copies sold and the Steam, GOG, and Xbox launch in May 2021 saw the product perform 'above expectations' by selling around 160.000 units with 81% of those units coming from Steam. According to the publisher EnadGlobal7, the PlayStation launch in October underperformed financially. As of July 2023, Mechwarrior 5: Mercenaries sat at 83% positive reviews on Steam out of 7294 total reviews, a rating Valve classifies as "very positive". As per October 2024, the game sold two million units.
