= No Greater Love =

The term no greater love is derived from a well-known verse of the New Testament (John 15): "Greater love hath no man than this, that a man lay down his life for his friends". This specific excerpt may refer to:

== Books, films and TV ==
- No Greater Love (novel), a 1991 novel by Danielle Steel
- "No Greater Love" (Only Fools and Horses), an episode of Only Fools and Horses
- Greater Love Hath No Man (1915 film), a 1915 American silent film starring Emmett Corrigan
- No Greater Love (1932 film), a 1932 American film starring Alexander Carr
- No Greater Love (1952 film), a 1952 German film
- No Greater Love (1959 film), the first part of the Japanese film series The Human Condition
- No Greater Love (1960 film), a 1960 American film
- No Greater Love (1996 film), a 1996 American TV film based on the Danielle Steel novel
- No Greater Love (2009 film), a documentary about the Discalced Order of Carmelite Nuns in London, England
- No Greater Love (2010 fim), a 2010 American film

== Music ==
- No Greater Love (album), a 1999 album by jazz musician Joe McPhee
- "No Greater Love", a song included on Kaleidoscope (Rachael Lampa album)
- "There Is No Greater Love", a 1936 jazz standard by Isham Jones and Marty Symes
- "No Greater Love", a song by Jars of Clay from The Shelter, 2010

== Other uses ==
- No Greater Love (charity), an American humanitarian, non-profit organization

== See also ==
- Maiorem hac dilectionem (Latin for 'Greater love than this'), a 2017 apostolic letter
