= MW4 =

MW4 may refer to:

- MechWarrior 4: Vengeance, a 2000 video game
- MechWarrior 4: Mercenaries, a 2002 video game
- Call of Duty: Modern Warfare 4, a 2026 video game
- An abbreviation of master warrant officer in the United States Armed Forces
- a model of Microwriter, a hand-held portable word-processor

== See also ==
- Call of Duty 4: Modern Warfare
