= Groove Media =

Canadian video game company

Groove Media Inc.
- Company type: Private
- Industry: Video games
- Founded: September 2001; 24 years ago
- Defunct: 2009; 17 years ago
- Headquarters: Toronto, Ontario, Canada
- Key people: Jon Walsh (CEO) Michael Haines (COO) Trevor Fencott (president)
- Services: SkillGround
- Divisions: Groove Games
- Subsidiaries: Bedlam Games

Groove Media Inc. was a Canadian developer and publisher of video games. Established in September 2001, it published more than 20 retail game titles through its publishing label Groove Games.

In December 2006, Groove Media launched SkillGround, an online software platform. It allowed visitors to download retail-quality games for free and play against competitors of similar skill levels for fun or for cash.

== Released games ==
Game	Year	Developer	Notes
Sno Cross Extreme	2002	Groove Games	
Devastation	2003	Digitalo Studios	Published by Arush Entertainment in Europe
CTU: Marine Sharpshooter	2003	Jarhead Games	Published by Light & Shadow Production in Europe
Western Outlaw: Wanted Dead or Alive	2003	Jarhead Games	
Desert Thunder	2003	Brainbox Games	
Marine Sharpshooter II: Jungle Warfare	2004	Jarhead Games	
Marine Heavy Gunner: Vietnam	2004	Brainbox Games	Published by City Interactive and Play Publishing in Europe
WWII Sniper: Call to Victory	2004	Jarhead Games	Published by City Interactive in Europe as Battlestrike: Call to Victory
Playboy: The Mansion	2005	Cyberlore Studios	Published by Ubisoft in Europe
Combat: Task Force 121	2005	Direct Action Games	Published by City Interactive in Europe as America's Secret Operations
Pariah	2005	Digital Extremes	Published by Hip Interactive in Europe
Army Ranger: Mogadishu	2005	Jarhead Games	Published by City Interactive in Europe as Terrorist Takedown: Conflict in Mogadishu
Land of the Dead: Road to Fiddler's Green	2005	Brainbox Games	Distributed by Atari
World War II Combat: Road to Berlin	2006	Direct Action Games	Published by City Interactive in Europe as Battlestrike: Secret Weapons
Warpath	2006	Digital Extremes	Published by Atari in Europe
World War II Combat: Iwo Jima	2006	Direct Action Games	Published by City Interactive in Europe as Heat of War
Kung Fu: Deadly Arts	2006	Bedlam Games	Not for retail, free-to-play through SkillGround
CQC – Close Quarters Conflict	2007	Direct Action Games	Published by City Interactive in Europe
Marine Sharpshooter III	2007	Jarhead Games	Published by City Interactive in Europe
L.A. Street Racing	2007	Invictus Games	Published by City Interactive in Europe as Overspeed: High Performance Speed Racing
UTour Golf	2007	Groove Games	Not for retail, free-to-play through SkillGround
Marine Sharpshooter IV	2008	Groove Games	Published by City Interactive in Europe
Day of the Zombie	2009	Groove Games	Released in CIS territories only
