= Warpath (video game) =

2006 video game

- Developer: Digital Extremes
- Publisher: Groove Games
- Designer: James Schmalz
- Engine: Unreal Engine 2
- Platforms: Windows, Xbox
- Release: NA: July 18, 2006; UK: March 2, 2007 (PC)
- Genre: First-person shooter
- Modes: Single-player, multiplayer

Warpath is a 2006 first-person shooter video game developed by Digital Extremes. The game was originally being developed as a sequel to Pariah, but since Pariah was a commercial flop, Warpath continued development as a whole new game. However, the similarities between the gameplay of both games are very apparent.

== Technology ==
The game utilizes Unreal Engine 2 with optimizations and additions of the 2.5 Build (the same used for Unreal Championship 2 and Pariah) and the Havok physics engine.

== Demo ==
A demo for the PC version of Warpath was released on March 1, 2006. The demo included two maps: "Breach" for Deathmatch and Team Deathmatch, and "Rush" for Capture The Flag. The Front Line Assault mode was not included. This demo is available on the disc included with April 2006 issue of PC Gamer.

A demo for the Xbox version of Warpath is available on the disc included with the June 2006 issue of Official Xbox Magazine. It was basically the same as the PC demo, though the Deathmatch/Team Deathmatch map that was included was SubZero instead of Breach.

== Reception ==
Reception

Aggregate score
Aggregator	Score	
Aggregator	PC	Xbox
Metacritic	57/100	53/100

Review scores
Publication	Score	
Publication	PC	Xbox
1Up.com	N/A	D+
Electronic Gaming Monthly	N/A	4.83/10
Game Informer	7.25/10	7.25/10
GameSpot	5.7/10	5.7/10
GameSpy	N/A	2.5/5
GameTrailers	6.4/10	6.4/10
GameZone	7.2/10	6/10
IGN	5.7/10	5.3/10
Official Xbox Magazine (US)	N/A	3/10
PC Gamer (US)	70%	N/A

The game received "mixed" reviews on both platforms according to the review aggregation website Metacritic. It was delayed multiple times from its original March 21, 2006, release date, and started to get better reactions from the press during its development, but it still continued to get mixed reviews. People who played the game or demo thought it was a top-notch fast-paced shooter. In the words of IGN:

"While WarPath doesn't do anything blatantly wrong, it fails to do anything new. Charging through the repetitive metallic halls of each level will feel very familiar to anyone who's played a lot of first person shooters. Even the bots on the hardest difficult suffer from noticeable A.I. issues, so if this one's to be played at all it should be online. After numerous hours of play some weapon balance issues will become apparent, especially with the Vibro Blade during close range battles. Vehicles are included, but they're generally useless as the stages are so small. A larger variety of game modes more interesting maps would have helped out, but ultimately WarPath does little too differentiate itself from the rest of the shooters out there. The upgradeable weapons are a good feature, but nothing that'll hold players' interest beyond a few hours."
