= Die Hard: Nakatomi Plaza =

2002 video game

- Developer: Piranha Games
- Publishers: Sierra Entertainment; Fox Interactive
- Directors: Russ Bullock; Bryan Ekman
- Producer: Chris Miller
- Designer: Alan Freemantle
- Programmer: Dejan Cecar
- Artist: Bryan Ekman
- Writers: Tom Gastall; Blake McCallister; John Melchior
- Composer: Guy Whitmore
- Platform: Microsoft Windows
- Release: NA: April 23, 2002; EU: May 24, 2002
- Genre: First-person shooter
- Mode: Single-player

Die Hard: Nakatomi Plaza is a 2002 first-person shooter video game developed by Piranha Games and published by Fox Interactive and Vivendi Universal Games through its subsidiary Sierra Entertainment exclusively for Microsoft Windows. The game features the voice of Reginald VelJohnson, reprising his role as Al Powell.

== Premise ==
The game consists mainly of recreations of events from the first Die Hard film in the form of a first-person shooter; however, there are additional elements that are exclusive to the game. Players assume the role of John McClane, attempting to thwart the terrorist attack at Nakatomi Plaza. The levels are based on the sets from the film, and the various action scenes from the film have also been recreated.

The game expands on the film's plot, adding a few missions that did not occur in the film, such as escorting a SWAT team around the office building and saving various hostages on several floors.

The game features standard first-person shooter gameplay. There are five different types of firearms, as well as other items, such as a Zippo lighter and a Motorola radio, that can be used to accomplish various tasks.

== Reception ==
Reception

Aggregate score
Aggregator	Score
Metacritic	54/100

Review scores
Publication	Score
AllGame	2.5/5
Computer Gaming World	1.5/5
Eurogamer	3/10
Game Informer	8/10
GameRevolution	D
GameSpot	5.7/10
GameSpy	69%
IGN	5.5/10
PC Gamer (US)	58%
PC Zone	74%
The Cincinnati Enquirer	3/5

The game received "mixed" reviews according to the review aggregation website Metacritic.
