= Immortal: Unchained =

2018 video game

- Developer: Toadman Interactive
- Publisher: Game Odyssey Ltd
- Platforms: Windows; PlayStation 4; Xbox One
- Release: 7 September 2018
- Genres: Action role-playing, third-person shooter
- Mode: Single-player

Immortal: Unchained is a 2018 action role-playing game developed by Toadman Interactive and published by Game Odyssey for Windows, PlayStation 4, and Xbox One. The gameplay is inspired by the Dark Souls series with a focus on futuristic firearms, while the setting and plot are inspired by Norse mythology and the events of Ragnarok.

== Gameplay ==
Immortal: Unchained is a third-person action game heavily inspired by the hardcore action role-playing game gameplay of the Dark Souls series, with a comparable difficulty level and many identical mechanics. The main deviation is the focus on firearms and gun combat instead of melee combat with medieval fantasy weaponry, although close combat weapons such as swords, axes, and clubs still exist in a more basic form. Enemies have critical hit locations (typically the head and a glowing weak point on their backs) which can be targeted for significantly increased damage.

== Plot ==
=== Setting and backstory ===
Immortal: Unchained takes place in an alternate universe with a backstory heavily inspired by Norse mythology. At the beginning of time, the Nine Realms and Nine Races were created by the Monolith, a stone artifact at the center of the universe with a bas relief of a tree on its face. The Prime and Azurian races went to war over control of the Monolith, with the Primes emerging victorious and taking their place as the rulers of the realms. The Prime's leader, King Naro, enlisted the aide of a Degonite warrior named Cathal to help fight the Azurians, to the objection of his sons Orin and Naylon. Due to their animosity towards him, the other Primes forbid Cathal from reproducing; instead, he tears out part of his heart and splits it into three pieces, which he uses to bring to life three children; Malog, Arlen, and Iska. Using the power of the Monolith, the three Oracles foretell a prophecy in which the three children of Cathal will bring about the downfall of the Primes.

In an attempt to avert the prophecy, the Primes imprison, exile, or kill Cathal's children, causing Cathal to swear revenge against the Primes, starting by slaying Naro's son Naylon, the most beloved of the Primes. Cathal is imprisoned for this crime. Malog is imprisoned in the depths of the Prime's capital city, growing into a powerful beast destined to kill King Naro. Arlen is exiled to the human forest world of Veridian, where he is tracked down and murdered by Orin in an attempt to avert the prophecy which states Arlen will kill Orin; however Arlen's vengeful spirit merges with the forest and corrupts it, trapping Orin when he attempts to escape. Iska escapes to the Abyss, where she uses cybernetics to create undead warriors, declaring herself the Queen of the Dead and raising an army of undead to get revenge against the Primes. After many generations, the Nine Realms begin to collapse, with the Prime civilization falling to ruin and Iska's undead army swarming across the universe, signalling the beginning of the End Times foretold by the prophecy.

=== Story ===
Players take the role of an unnamed Prisoner who is released by Aras, the Prime caretaker of the Monolith, in an attempt to avert the End Times. The Prisoner has amnesia, which Aras believes is a side effect of their long imprisonment. Aras tasks the Prisoner with repairing the Monolith by restoring 3 Nexus Orbs from which the Monolith draws its power, located on the lifeless snow planet of Arden, the human forest world of Veridian, and the abandoned Prime homeworld of Apexion. The Prisoner restores all 3 Nexus Orbs, in the process fighting through numerous undead who are invading all the worlds. The Prisoner and Aras then use the Monolith's power to push back an attack on the Monolith chamber by the undead armies led by Iska herself.

Consulting the restored Monolith, Aras learns that the Nine Realms are collapsing because of an instability located within the Stream, an alternate dimension emanating from the Monolith which is the source of all creation. Aras tells the Prisoner to find and kill the three children of Cathal and collect their hearts, in order to use their combined power to open a rift into the Stream. The Prisoner does so; in the process, the Prisoner can encounter King Naro, Orin, and a human woman warrior named Bren, in the process helping Naro and Orin escape their destiny to die by Malog and Arlen's hands while helping Bren recover her lost memories after her escape from the Abyss.

When the Prisoner brings all three hearts to Aras, Aras opens the rift into the Stream then reveals that the Prisoner is actually Cathal himself, who Aras always despised, and gloats about how he made Cathal kill his own children. Aras then attacks the Prisoner in order to fulfill his role in the prophecy. The Prisoner kills Aras, then enters the Stream, eventually discovering that the source of the instability destroying the Nine Realms is the spirit of Naylon, who after being driven insane by centuries of torture at the hands of Iska, is attempting to create a new paradise universe using the power of the Stream, a process which will destroy the current universe.

After defeating Naylon, the Prisoner transforms into Cathal, who reveals that the Monolith and the Oracles can only predict the actions of beings from their universe, so he allowed his body to be possessed and controlled by a being from another universe (the player), in order to manipulate the prophecy to his own ends. He also reveals that the blade he killed Naylon with was coated with a poison meant to drive his soul insane and distract everyone by attempting to create a new universe and destroy the current one. With Naylon defeated, the new universe will be created and the current one destroyed, but with no one in control anymore. Cathal then directly addresses the player, stating that he doesn't really know exactly who or what they are, but that they are no longer needed. He then shuts off the player's video monitor.

== Reception ==
Reception

Aggregate score
Aggregator	Score
Metacritic	(PC) 63/100 (PS4) 49/100 (XONE) 51/100

Review score
Publication	Score
Push Square	6/10

Immortal: Unchained received mixed reviews. On Metacritic, the Windows version has a score of 63% based on reviews from 6 critics.
