= CTU: Marine Sharpshooter =

2003 video game

- Developer: Jarhead Games
- Publisher: Groove Games
- Director: Alan Freemantle
- Programmers: John Twigg; Jason Verhiel
- Artist: Tyler Wilson
- Composer: Brian Youds
- Platforms: Windows, iOS
- Release: March 20, 2003
- Genre: First-person shooter
- Mode: Single-player

CTU: Marine Sharpshooter is a first-person shooter video game developed by Jarhead Games and published by Groove Games, released March 20, 2003. Ports for PlayStation 2 and Xbox were planned but cancelled. A sequel, Marine Sharpshooter II: Jungle Warfare, was released in 2004.

It was published on iOS by Groove Games, and was acquired by XMG Studio on March 22, 2010. On iOS, the game hit number one in multiple countries, and has been downloaded over a million times.

== Plot ==
The game's story details the adventures of Lieutenant Smith and Sergeant Cooper, a US Marine Corps scout sniper, team as they chase down some warlords in Afghanistan and follow the trail of lost nuclear materials. The player assumes the role of the sniper, as you take on an army of terrorists and mercenaries in order to prevent nuclear holocaust.

== Gameplay ==
CTU: Marine Sharpshooter's gameplay involves both sniping and close combat. The main shooting mechanic is sniping, with the ability to use the sniper rifle's scope to zoom in on far away targets. Close combat is done with a pistol with an optional silencer, or a knife. Several points in the game require the player to stay in one spot engaging hostiles that emerge from various doorways and windows. At other times, the player can explore the map freely. The game features simulations of the sniper rifles used by the US Marine Corps snipers, as well as other real weapons, such as assault rifles, pistols, and sniper rifles. There is even the occasional RPG used by the enemy.

The game's environment varies from the caves and small villages of Afghanistan, to the snowy cliffs and rooftops of Chechnya, to sandy beaches and jungles of Pacific island. Interaction between player and environment is minimal.

The game features a semi-intelligent spotter, who can be set to follow you or hold position, and "hold fire" or "fire at will". The spotter call out the compass heading of the direction that enemies are in as they come within a certain range. The spotter can also assist the player in engaging enemies. You fail a mission if the spotter dies or if you die.

The game features a few first-aid kits as standard inventory, which will patch you up a little after taking hits. Your spotter has his own kits, and he will use them during lulls in fighting. You cannot patch him up, nor vice versa. There are also no further kits or ammunition available within the mission. However, small quantities of ammunition can be obtained from the sniper rifles you pick up from dead enemies.

== Reception ==
CTU: Marine Sharpshooter was poorly received, with a score on IGN of 4.1 ("bad") and the reviewer calling it a "rehash" and an "impersonator" of better titles. The game sold close to 500,000 copies.

== Sequel ==
Marine Sharpshooter 2: Jungle Warfare is a sequel to CTU: Marine Sharpshooter published on June 24, 2004. Deployed into one of Africa's most dangerous countries, the objective of the game is to find the President of Burundi and rescue him from heavily armed rebels and the ruthless mercenaries who back them. If the rebels are not stopped and the President dies, they will plunge the region into a brutal civil war.
