= Combat: Task Force 121 =

2005 video game

- Developer: Direct Action Games
- Publishers: NA: Groove Games; EU: City Interactive (PC)
- Platforms: Windows, Xbox
- Release: NA: March 22, 2005; EU: January 9, 2006 (PC)
- Genre: First-person shooter
- Modes: Single-player, multiplayer

Combat: Task Force 121, known in Europe as America's Secret Operations, is a first-person shooter developed by Direct Action Games for Microsoft Windows and Xbox in 2005.

== Reception ==
Reception

Aggregate score
Aggregator	Score	
Aggregator	PC	Xbox
Metacritic	40/100	44/100

Review scores
Publication	Score	
Publication	PC	Xbox
Computer Games Magazine	1.5/5	N/A
Computer Gaming World	1.5/5	N/A
Game Informer	4/10	4/10
GameSpot	5.4/10	5.4/10
GameStar	40%	N/A
Jeuxvideo.com	3/20	N/A
Official Xbox Magazine (US)	N/A	2.5/10
PC Gamer (US)	28%	N/A
TeamXbox	N/A	6.8/10

The game received "unfavorable" reviews on both platforms according to the review aggregation website Metacritic.
