= UTour Golf =

2007 video game

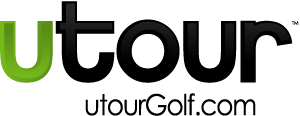
- Developer(s): Gusto Games
- Publisher(s): Groove Games
- Platform(s): SkillGround
- Release: 2007
- Genre(s): Golf, Sports
- Mode(s): Multiplayer

UTour Golf was an online golf game developed by British studio Gusto Games and published by Groove Media Inc. The game was released through SkillGround: an online, skill-gaming platform owned by Groove but closed its doors in 2009 and the domains are now dormant.

Players could compete in single and multiplayer games for free, or challenge others to cash games where the winner collected a cash prize. This was not considered gambling, as the outcome was based on skill. Despite this fact, the service was still restricted within 13 states of the United States.

Free play was supported by advertising, displayed both before the game starts, and during play on billboards presented within the game. Cash play had no advertisements outside of game play, and was supported by a rake placed on wagers.

== Game Play ==
Game play was based on a three click system. The user had to click at certain times as a progress bar sweeps from left to right, then back from right to left.

The first sweep controlled the power; the closer to the right end of the shot bar, the more power the shot had. The second sweep controlled the accuracy; the closer to a center line near the left end, the more accurate the shot was.

Game play was also affected by such issues as wind, weather, club type, pin and tee locations, and grass roughness. These affected accuracy, how far the ball would fly, and how far the ball would roll.

Players were also matched on the site by a ranking system. This system provided a numerical estimate of a player's skill level. By viewing the skill level of an opponent, a player decided to accept or refuse challenges. A handicap system was also available where strokes may have been forfeited to an opponent to allow players of different skill levels to compete on a more even playing field.

The game also provided detailed statistics, though these were only available to the player, and were not publicly shared.

== Rules ==
UTour offered different game modes based on traditional golf rules. Players could compete under the Stroke Play, Match Play, or Stableford Plus rule sets.

Mini-games based on driving ranges and putting challenges were also available.

== Contests ==
UTour offered a number of partner sponsored tournaments with prizes generally consisting of golf-related trips or golf equipment.

These included:

- A trip to the Michael Jordan Celebrity Invitational – Sponsored by Golf.com
- A trip to Maui Hawaii – Sponsored by Sports Illustrated (SI.com)
- A trip to Las Vegas – Sponsored by GolfLink.com
- New golf clubs – Sponsored by Callaway Golf

UTour also held contests geared towards cash rewards for Players' Club members, an example of which was the 2008 Cup Classic

== History ==
UTour Golf was released both through UTourGolf.com and SkillGround.com in August 2007. SkillGround had been previously released in December 2006.

It was initially launched in a beta format, and was subsequently upgraded. In November 2007, the following features were added:

- Handicap – Players of varying skill levels could compete more fairly by forfeiting strokes.
- One Hole Option – Players could compete in single hole matches.
- Player Created Tournaments – Players could challenge their friends to closed tournaments.
- Driving Range Mini Game – A new game play mode modeling a driving range was available in single player and tournament game types.
- Increased Statistics – The statistics tracking feature was extended from cash players to both cash and free players.
