= MechWarrior 3050 =

1996 video game

- North American cover art
- Developers: Genesis; Malibu Interactive; SNES; Tiburon Entertainment
- Publishers: Genesis; Extreme Entertainment Group; SNES: NA: Activision; JP: Ask Group (Kodansha)
- Producer: Bernard Whang
- Designers: Michael Case; Noel Hines; David H. Luehmann; Randy Oyler; Denny Thorley; Mick West; Bernard Whang
- Programmers: Michael Case; Mick West
- Artists: Noel Hines; Christian G. Sean
- Composers: Keith Arem; SNES: Brian L. Schmidt
- Series: BattleTech; MechWarrior
- Platforms: Sega Genesis, Super NES
- Release: Sega Genesis: NA: September 1994; Super NES: EU: 1995; NA: October 1995; JP: February 23, 1996
- Genre: Sci-fi mech simulation
- Modes: Single-player, multiplayer

MechWarrior 3050, also known as BattleTech in its original Sega Genesis release and in Japan as BattleTech 3050 (バトルテック3050), is a 1994 mech-based video game developed by Malibu. The first BattleTech based game to be released for the Sega Genesis, it was later ported to the Super NES by Activision as MechWarrior 3050. The Super NES version was localized and published in Japan by Ask Group.

The story takes place during the events of the Clan Invasion in the 3050 era. Players are assigned the role of a Clan Wolf Mechwarrior, who is sent to eliminate several Inner Sphere assets which threaten to destroy the Clan's dominance on the battlefield, and given a Timber Wolf/MadCat mech.

This video game is viewed in an isometric view as opposed to the first person view of the previous game. The game also features a two-player mode where one player controls the bottom half of the mech to navigate it around the map while the second player controls the gun turret.

== Gameplay ==
The game features an isometric perspective and centers around controlling a Mad Cat/Timber Wolf mech to destroy the Inner Sphere bases. Gameplay unfolds across five distinct stages, each featuring a unique environment such as swamps, deserts, or frozen wastelands. All missions are presented to the player in the form of a news feed.

Mission objectives range from destroying enemy radars and factories to conducting rescue operations, all of which involve extensive use of weaponry. The Mad Cat/Timber Wolf mech, with its ability to rotate 360 degrees, is armed with an array of weaponry, including missiles, lasers, mines, and flamethrowers, which the player chooses at the beginning of each mission. Limited ammunition necessitates frequent restocking from crates scattered around the map.

Damage inflicted by enemies increases the Mech's damage and overheating indicators. If these indicators reach critical levels, the player loses a life. Collected coolant fluid can reduce overheating. The game also offers an innovative cooperative mode for two players, with one player controlling the robot's legs and the other managing the torso and weaponry.

== Reception ==
Reception

Review scores
Publication	Score
Electronic Gaming Monthly	7.5/10 (Genesis); 6.75/10 (SNES)
GamePro	4/5 (SNES)
Next Generation	3/5 (SNES)
VideoGames & Computer Entertainment	9/10 (Genesis)
Electric Playground	9/10 (Genesis)
Ultimate Nintendo	2/5 (SNES)
Sega-16	8/10 (Genesis)

Though the four reviewers of Electronic Gaming Monthly complained that the game's single-player mode is difficult to the point of being inaccessible, all but one of them gave the Genesis version a positive recommendation, citing the diversity of missions, strong challenge, and impressive animations. They were evenly split on the Super NES version, with two of them recommending it based on the diversity of levels, and the other two focusing on the frustratingly difficult single player mode and the confusing controls. They scored it a 6.75 out of 10 average. A critic for Next Generation gave it three out of five stars, assessing that, compared to the Genesis original, it has sharper graphics but clunkier animation and worse control. He praised the game itself for its frantic, challenging onslaught of enemies. GamePro's Scary Larry was uneasy at how the two-player mode demands that the two players be in perfect sync with each other, and said that the failure to do so could lead to bitter arguments. He also criticized the undetailed graphics, choppy animation, and limited sound effects, but recommended the game for its challenging, strategic, and overall fun gameplay.

Victor Lucas of Electric Playground lauded the game, drawing comparisons to the gameplay of Desert Strike: Return to the Gulf. Lucas particularly appreciated a control feature that allowed the player to shoot without changing the course of movement, but he did note that the game's graphics could have been more refined, specifically regarding enemy detailing. Similarly, drawing a comparison to Jungle Strike from the Strike series, Nikos Constant of VideoGames & Computer Entertainment found BattleTech to be considerably more engaging. In his view, BattleTech is a "great war game", where success hinges on the player's ability to simultaneously utilize strategy, skill, and a bit of luck.

Ken Horowitz from Sega-16 commented on the sense of power that BattleTech offers to the player when controlling a massive combat robot. Horowitz noted that the game more closely resembled a solitary MechAssault entry, characterized by its methodical and thoughtful gameplay pace. In a retrospective review, Jim Evans from the Ultimate Nintendo collection felt that while the game could have seen Desert Strike-style success, its overly complex gameplay, heightened by the appearance of enemy Mechs and time constraints, made the game unnecessarily difficult. Evans posited that with a more balanced difficulty level, the game could have become a "classic".
