= Reeker =

- Theatrical release poster
- Directed by: Dave Payne
- Written by: Dave Payne
- Produced by: Dave Payne; Tina Illman; Amanda Klein
- Starring: Devon Gummersall; Derek Richardson; Tina Illman; Scott Whyte; Arielle Kebbel; Michael Ironside; Eric Mabius
- Cinematography: Mike Mickens
- Edited by: Daniel Barone
- Music by: Dave Payne
- Production companies: Cinema Management Group; The Institution
- Distributed by: Primal Pictures; Pathé
- Release date: March 13, 2005 (United States)
- Running time: 90 minutes
- Country: United States
- Language: English

Reeker (released in the Philippines as Dead People 2) is a 2005 American supernatural slasher film written and directed by Dave Payne. The plot centers on a group of young adults who are stranded in a desert oasis where they fall prey to a horrific decaying creature. This film is Marcia Strassman’s final film appearance before her death in 2014.

== Plot ==
A family is driving down a desert highway when they hit a deer. The dad gets out and comes back with half his face gone. The family is attacked by something.

In a lavish apartment, Trip meets with a dealer, Radford, who provides him with pills for a rave in the desert. When Radford leaves the room, Trip steals all of the pills. He meets with his friends Cookie, Nelson, Jack (who is blind), and Gretchen. The group then stops at a diner where Trip, not believing Jack is really blind, jokingly tricks him into using the women's restroom. When he realizes his mistake, Trip admits to Nelson that he stole the drugs he currently has, and Nelson reminds him how insane this dealer is, explaining he's even killed someone before. Trip simply passes it off as a legend. The dealer then calls Trip on his cellphone and says he is aware he stole the drugs because he caught him on his computer webcam and says he wants the drugs back, and Trip agrees to meet with the dealer at Area 52, Kelton in 2 hours or he is dead. The group then leaves the diner. The group notices an overturned car on the highway, which they dismiss as an abandoned accident.

Gretchen discovers that Trip is carrying drugs and stops the vehicle to kick him out. While parking at the side of the road, the group notices a short, but strong tremor. Gretchen agrees to take Trip back to the diner, which has been abandoned. The car runs out of gas and breaks down, so they decide to stay at the Halfway Motel next to the diner. Learning from the radio that the highway has been closed, Trip decides to walk down the road for help. Jack and Gretchen pitch camp outside. After a close call with the drug dealer Radford at another stop, Trip escapes and meets a man named Henry driving an RV, who is looking for his missing wife. He goes with Trip to the motel and sets up camp there. Trip doesn't tell his friends about his run-in with Radford, but warns them to be careful.

Looking for signal reception for his mobile phone, Trip releases from a rubbish skip the still-living head, torso, and arms of a truck driver, who then crawls away. Henry then meets Trip and discovers they both are seeing the dead people. While in his camper, Henry collapses, seemingly suffocating as a dark figure moves through the trailer. Still looking for reception, Trip is attacked on the roof by a hooded figure. Cookie is killed while sitting in an outhouse by being dragged into the hole.

Nelson is almost dragged under his bed, but pulls himself back up and jumps on top of the bed. He takes his sneaker off and drops it on the ground, watching as it is shredded. He then tries to escape by jumping through the window, but fatally cuts his throat on a shard of glass. Gretchen and Jack discover Nelson's and Henry's bodies, prompting Gretchen to look for Trip and Cookie. Jack encounters the creature but escapes when Trip, who has lost an arm, shoots at the figure with his gun. Trip is overpowered by the creature and dies.

In reality, an RV crashed into Gretchen's car after Trip stepped out to call for a ride, at the moment when they experienced the tremor. None of the group had noticed the RV, whose driver was Henry. His wife, Rose, explained to the officers on the scene that Henry suffered a heart attack and lost control. The car that the group saw leaving the diner was, in fact, their own.

Each of the deaths at the hotel were reflected by their own deaths in the car: Cookie died from internal bleeding; Nelson cut his neck when he was thrown through the windshield; Trip's arm was severed gripping the cell phone, and he died from blunt force trauma. Gretchen survived the crash because she was wearing her seat belt and Jack, despite receiving a massive head injury and a broken arm, also remained alive in the car. Radford, who had been stalking Trip, witnessed the accident and attempted to assist; hence the visions of him at the motel and highway.

In the final scene, Gretchen and Jack briefly discuss the fact that neither has any recollection of the accident, and no mention is made of the incidents at the motel. Jack comments that, for a moment in the crash, he thought he could see Gretchen, offhandedly mentioning the color of her eyes.

== Cast ==
- Devon Gummersall as Jack
- Derek Richardson as Nelson
- Tina Illman as Gretchen
- Scott Whyte as Trip
- Arielle Kebbel as "Cookie"
- Michael Ironside as Henry Stuckey
- Eric Mabius as Radford
- Marcia Strassman as Rose Stuckey
- David Hadinger as The Reeker
- Les Jankey as Trucker
- Carole Ruggier as Mom
- Paul Butcher as Kid
- Steven Zlotnick as Officer Bern
- Christopher Boyer as Officer Mansfield
- Wesley Thompson as Officer Taylor
- Alejandro Patiño as Velez, The Medic

== Release ==
Reeker premiered at the South by Southwest Film Festival on March 13, 2005. It was later screened at the Tribeca Film Festival on April 19 that same year, as well as the Screamfest Film Festival on October 21.

In the Philippines, Reeker was released as Dead People 2 on March 7, 2007.

=== Home media ===
The film was released on DVD by Fox on Oct 23, 2006. It was later re-released by Showtime Entertainment on Sep 25, 2007.

== Reception ==
On Rotten Tomatoes the film has a rating of 54% "Rotten" based on 12 reviews.

Variety critic John Anderson wrote called it a "glossy, gory takeoff on the teensploitation slasher flick that might just shock skeptics by scaring up crossover success." Peter Bradshaw from The Observer gave the film a negative review, awarding the film 1 out of 4 stars, stating, "You'd be a millionaire if you had a pound for every low-budget horror like this in existence, photographed like this, in this desert locale, and with this ending".

Kim Newman from Empire awarded Reeker 4 out of 5 stars, praising the film's characterizations, and well used setting, old fashion monster. In his review he writes, "Despite the title, this is no stinker, the opposite, in fact, offering superior scares to recent offerings from the likes of Rob Zombie and even Eli Roth". Dread Central also offer the film similar praise, stating, "Reeker is worth both a look and a buy. Even better? Dave Payne is back and working on No Mans Land: Reeker 2 so hopefully there's some more smartly written gore soaked hi-jinx in our future! Let's hope that lightning can strike twice".

Marc Savlov from The Austin Chronicle complimented the film's direction, acting, writing, "If all rave preparties were this much fun, Fatboy Slim might still have a career". In their book Horror Films by Subgenre: A Viewer's Guide, authors Kathleen and Chris Vander Kaay praised the film, calling it "A clever supernatural film that takes the conceit of the slasher framework and uses the set-up in a fresh and original way."

== Prequel ==
A prequel titled No Man's Land: The Rise of Reeker was released on DVD in the U.S. on October 14, 2008.
