= Land of the Dead: Road to Fiddler's Green =

2005 video game

- Developer: Brainbox Games
- Publisher: Groove Games
- Designer: Josh Druckman
- Engine: Unreal Engine 2
- Platforms: Windows, Xbox
- Release: NA: October 20, 2005; AU: November 30, 2005; (Windows)
- Genre: First-person shooter
- Modes: Single-player, multiplayer

Land of the Dead: Road to Fiddler's Green is a 2005 licensed first-person shooter game based on George A. Romero's zombie horror movie Land of the Dead, developed by Brainbox Games and published by Groove Games. It is a prequel to the film, taking place during the initial outbreak of the zombie pandemic. The game was released for Windows and Xbox in October/November 2005. It received generally poor reviews from critics.

== Gameplay ==
Land of the Dead: Road to Fiddler's Green utilizes traditional first-person shooter gameplay. Players can use a variety of either melee weapons or firearms to fight through the zombie hordes. Some weapons are capable of dismembering the zombies, whilst other weapons are not. The zombies' jaws, heads, arms, forearms, and legs can be shot or chopped off by the player; This can very effectively save the player so as to make an escape. The zombies themselves appear in many varieties (regular, ones armed with a melee weapon, crawlers, puking ones, screamers that summon other zombies, and poisonous, exploding ones) and each takes a different number of hits to kill, which varies upon the difficulty setting of the game. The player cannot become a zombie, but it is stated that people who die for any reason become zombies, like in the movie.

The multiplayer component of the game consists of many online game types. These consist of deathmatch, team deathmatch, and "Capture the Flag" modes. There is also an "Invasion" (co-op survival) mode, in which players are trapped in a small map where they must survive for a chosen amount of time. In this mode, the weapons and ammunition regenerate in the same spots each time, allowing the players to dodge the burden of ammunition shortages. Players can pick up melee weapons from recently killed melee weapon wielding zombies as well. In some variants of Invasion maps, players who die or are bitten by zombies become zombies themselves, and try to kill their former teammates. In line with other online-enabled games on the Xbox, multiplayer on Xbox Live was available to players until 15 April 2010. Land of the Dead: Road to Fiddler's Green is now playable online again on the replacement Xbox Live servers called Insignia.

== Plot ==
One day, a farmer named Jack finds his home besieged by the undead. After finding his neighbors dead, he makes his way to the city, hoping to find help, but instead finds the city in ruins, overrun by the undead. Jack later heads to a police station and frees a criminal named Otis who tells him about the existence of a safe-haven located in downtown Pittsburgh. After they claim a boat in the docks, Jack learns Otis was infected by the undead and is forced to kill him. Upon reaching the safe-haven, Jack meets the city's ruler, Paul Kaufman. Kaufman requests Jack to dispose of the remaining undead swarming a luxury skyscraper called "Fiddler's Green". With "Fiddler's Green" rid of the undead, Kaufman opens it to the wealthy and gives Jack a place to live. Meanwhile, the undead make their way to the safe-haven, breaking through its borders.

== Development and release ==
Land of the Dead: Road to Fiddler's Green was originally developed under the title Day of The Zombie. Designer Christopher Locke felt that the Living Dead series was "just fantastic from a game design perspective", and took the opportunity that Romero was filming Land of the Dead to consider a tie-in. Brainbox Games had a fully developed single-player PC game before approaching Universal Pictures about a licensing deal. The studio approved it, and worked with the developers to add story elements and environments that would tie it into the movie, such as not including the word "zombie". Groove rereleased the game for PC under the original title on March 6, 2009, for CIS territories only. This used some of the original game assets – the same engine, zombie models, AI, and weapons – with some changes to the plot and settings to avoid copyright issues.

== Reception ==
Reception

Aggregate score
Aggregator	Score	
Aggregator	PC	Xbox
Metacritic	36/100	32/100

Review scores
Publication	Score	
Publication	PC	Xbox
Computer Games Magazine	2/5	N/A
GameSpot	2.1/10	1.9/10
PC Gamer (UK)	28%	N/A
PC Gamer (US)	40%	N/A
TeamXbox	N/A	3.1/10

Land of the Dead: Road to Fiddler's Green received "generally unfavorable" reviews from critics, according to review aggregator website Metacritic. GameSpot's Alex Navarro wrote that the game was "either the most avant-garde piece of gaming artistry to ever find its way to the retail market, or the absolute worst game of the year. Actually, it's probably just the latter." The Xbox version was later chosen by the website as the worst game of 2005.

== See also ==
- List of zombie video games
