= L.A. Street Racing =

2006 video game

- Developer: Invictus Games
- Publishers: Groove Games; City Interactive (Europe)
- Platform: Microsoft Windows
- Release: EU: December 1, 2006; NA: May 28, 2007
- Genre: Racing
- Modes: Single-player, multiplayer

L.A. Street Racing is a racing video game developed by Invictus Games and published by Groove Games exclusively for Microsoft Windows. It was released on 1 December 2006 in Europe and on 28 May 2007 in North America. The game was re-released in June 2008 by City Interactive under the title Overspeed: High Performance Street Racing, as a low-price (budget) game.

== Plot ==
Matt Peacock is the best race driver in the underground of L.A. and the player wants to take that title away from him. But, of course, the best of the best does not race a newcomer, so the player has to race their way up starting from 61st place.

== Gameplay ==
At the beginning of the game, the player chooses one of two available cars, before waiting at the "COOL-Market" for contestants to arrive. Once someone willing to race comes by, the player is given a choice of tuning parts from their opponent that the player can race for. Before each race, the player must bet on one of their own items. Since the game doesn't allow manual saving, if they lose a part, they'll need to earn it again.

Every part of the player's car (engine, nitro, etc.) can be enhanced in several stages and once the player has collected all parts of the same stage, the player can do a "pinkslip race", in which the opponent bets his car. Losing that race will cost every single tuning part the player has collected for the player's car. The parts the player wins are limited to the car they win them with, so the player cannot swap them between cars. If the player put parts of different stages on their car, the handling will decrease, So, the player has to think carefully if they should go for the powerful tier 3 engine, even if it makes the car's handling much worse.

The ranking list is split into four prestige levels, and each level has its own starting location. For instance, if the player goes to the Village Motel, the player needs prestige level 4 to race or otherwise they will send the player away. The same thing happens when the player is level 2 and the player waits at the COOL-Market because the player is too powerful for them.

The races themselves take place on marked-off streets in Los Angeles at night. The cars handle more realistically than the ones in Need for Speed: Carbon, which means that the player cannot "fly" through curves by taking the foot from the acceleration for a second. The player should keep in mind that if they take a curve too steeply, the car may drift into the scenery. Additionally, driving certain parts of the race track without making mistakes will reward the player with a small nitro refill.

L.A. Street Racing features an online mode where players can drive against up to seven other opponents.

== Reception ==
IGN gave the game a score of 6.5 out of 10, stating, "The framework for a very cool racing game is here, and certainly the driving physics are superb. Yet so much of it seems incomplete or untested. The AI needs polishing, and the upgrade system is promising yet flawed. Still, at its reduced price point, LA Street Racing is an interesting, thrilling option."
