= MechWarrior 5: Clans =

2024 video game

- Developer: Piranha Games
- Publisher: Enad Global 7
- Producer: Mark Natividad
- Designer: Paul Inouye
- Programmer: Brian Windover
- Artist: Dennis de Koning
- Writers: Chris Lworey; Kirk Paul; Lulu Kadhim
- Composer: Sean Kolton
- Series: MechWarrior
- Engine: Unreal Engine 5
- Platform: Microsoft Windows. Xbox Series X/S. PlayStation 5
- Release: WW: October 16, 2024
- Genre: Mecha
- Modes: Single-player, multiplayer

MechWarrior 5: Clans is a mecha video game, developed by Piranha Games and published by Enad Global 7, released worldwide on October 16, 2024. The game tells the in-universe story of OPERATION Revival from the perspective of five newly-minted MechWarriors from Clan Smoke Jaguar. It is the first BattleTech/MechWarrior game told from the perspective of the Clans since MechWarrior 2 (released in 1995).

== Synopsis ==
MechWarrior 5: Clans is set in the BattleTech universe. The player plays the role of star commander Jayden of a Clan Smoke Jaguar star, during the start and middle of the Clan invasion.

== Gameplay ==
Mechwarrior 5: Clans largely follows the mech combat and management established in MechWarrior 5: Mercenaries, but is a story-driven linear campaign structure with a much heavier emphasis on narrative presentation, instead of an open-world sandbox-style like its predecessor. Using the new toolsets provided by Unreal Engine 5, Piranha Games produced pre-rendered cinematic cutscenes that emphasized voice acting and motion-capture performances.

== Downloadable Content ==
=== Trials of War ===
Mechwarrior 5: Clans received its first downloadable content (DLC) with the Trials of War expansion on November 25 and was initially sold for 19.99 USD on release. This DLC offered new gameplay systems with 5-player PvP Arena Mode, co-op Horde Mode, and 12 new Omnimech variants. The DLC was received negatively by both critics and fans and Piranha Games made it free, refunded those who bought it, and absorbed the DLC into the base Mechwarrior 5: Clans game .

=== Ghost Bear Flash Storm ===
On May 7, 2025, MechWarrior 5: Clans received its first story-focused expansion with a new 12 mission campaign that followed a new cast of characters from Clan Ghost Bear and set in the same time period as the base game's Clan Smoke Jaguar campaign. The DLC also included 4 new OmniMechs and 4 new BattleMechs and introduced 'elementals' as a smaller support unit which had not appeared in the MechWarrior series since MechWarrior 3. The expansion was received positively by critics and players . According to the publisher Enad Global 7, Ghost Bear Flash Storm performed commercially "nicely" and "within expectations" .

==== Wolves of Tukayyid ====
On November 5, 2025, Piranha Games announced they are developing a second story-focused DLC Wolves of Tukayyid set to release on December 4, 2025 . The DLC features 20 new missions focused on Clan Wolf and with six new 'Mech chassis.

== Reception ==
Reception

Aggregate score
Aggregator	Score
Metacritic	79/100

Review scores
Publication	Score
IGN	80/100
PC Gamer (US)	82/100

As of November 2024, MechWarrior 5: Clans had "Generally Favorable" reviews according to review aggregator Metacritic.
