= Chaos Legion =

2003 video game

- German PC box art
- Developer: Capcom Production Studio 6
- Publisher: Capcom
- Director: Makoto Maeda
- Producer: Yoshinori Ono
- Artist: Wataru Kanayama
- Composer: Hideyuki Fukasawa
- Platforms: PlayStation 2, Windows
- Release: PlayStation 2: JP: March 6, 2003; NA: August 5, 2003; EU: September 5, 2003; AU: September 12, 2003; Windows: PAL: November 14, 2003; NA: December 5, 2003
- Genres: Action-adventure, hack and slash
- Mode: Single-player

Chaos Legion (Note: Japanese: カオス レギオン, Hepburn: Kaosu Region) is a 2003 action-adventure game developed and published by Capcom. The game received a seven-volume light novel series by Tow Ubukata with art by Satoru Yuiga.

The story of Chaos Legion is a gothic opera which begins November, 791 A.S. (Anno Satanis): the protagonist, Sieg Wahrheit, is a Knight of the Dark Glyphs who is on a quest under command of the Order of St. Overia to find his former friend, Victor Delacroix, who has stolen the forbidden book "Apocrypha of Yzarc", and to stop him from releasing the evil spirit Azrail, who would destroy the three planes of existence: the Nether World, the Middle World, and the Celestial World.

== Gameplay ==
The gameplay is primarily action-oriented. Numerous enemies attack the player in waves, and progress to the next part of the stage often requires defeat of all enemies in the area. The main feature that lends originality to the game is the addition of the "Chaos Legion", which are supernatural creatures that fight alongside the player. While legions are summoned, Sieg Wahrheit (the player character) is unable to run and has weaker melee attacks. Legions can be controlled to a degree: their tactics can be switched between offensive and defensive, and players can issue orders for them to attack immediately. While the legions are inactive, Sieg can perform a sort of special attack called an Assist Attack which causes a legion to appear and attack with him.

=== Upgrades ===
In game, it is possible to increase the power of the legions at Sieg's command using experience gained in battle. There are 4 main areas for increasing a legion's power, namely :

- Force: Upgrading this increases the number of legionnaires when summoned.
- Assist: Upgrading this increases the duration and power of the Assist Attack.
- Enchant: Upgrading this gives the player the benefits of all special attacks granted by a legion, without having to equip the legion.
- Attack and Defense: Upgrading this increases the attack and defense strength of that legion.

== Synopsis ==
=== Plot ===
In the beginning of the plot, Victor feels that Sieg was responsible for the death of his lover—and Sieg's friend—Siela Riviere, three years ago (prior to the events in the story which take place in the mentioned time); and has the intent on bringing Sieg into a pure pandemonium that Victor himself has prepared as retribution, not only for the sins of Sieg alone, but for the sins of the whole world —referring to this Armageddon as the “Purification of the World”: whereupon he plans to use relentless hordes of hideous monsters to cleanse the world of sinners by obtaining the "Three Sacred Glyphs" and releasing Azrail.

During his quest, Sieg encounters a member of the "Maidens of the Silver" fighting a monster alone after other Maidens are killed. With Sieg's help, Arcia Rinslet, the sole survivor, manages to escape death. At first, Arcia mentions that the Maidens were in tough pursuit of Victor; thus, when she learns that Sieg is also searching for the same person, she decides to tag along. Later, it is revealed that Arcia has held a grudge against Victor for the murder of her brother. Sieg never tells Arcia why he pursues Victor, even though he does say the two knew each other from before. Because of this lack of trust, Arcia briefly loses her faith in Sieg and sets off to find Victor alone. Sieg eventually catches up and subsequently teams up with her once more after he consoles her.

Sieg and Arcia meet Victor several times: each time to have a little more of Victor's plan revealed, but unable to stop him from obtaining the Three Sacred Glyphs. Soon, Sieg and Arcia finally meet Victor in the “Hall of Chaos”, the place where Azrail has been sealed. Victor decides to “punish” Sieg first: by killing Arcia—forcing her to do it with her own gun after gaining control of her body—since it seems that she is close to Sieg. The murder fails, unbeknownst to Sieg, who lashes out and attacks Victor because he believes Arcia to be dead. After subduing Victor, Sieg learns that Arcia survived the shot, only to find that Victor has not been fully defeated.

Surrounded in black aura, Victor attacks Sieg once again, but Arcia steps in between Sieg and Victor with her arms outstretched. Instead of killing her, Victor stops abruptly and regains control; a flashback then reveals the truth of the past: Three years before, Sieg, Victor and Siela were instructed by the Order to reseal the demon Azrail—discovering that the Order actually planned to use Azrail's power for world dominance, but realized that it was too powerful to contain. The demon resisted and decided that, instead of being banished once more, it would possess a human: Siela; Victor tried to protect Siela, but was possessed instead. In his uncontrollable rampage, he almost killed Sieg, but Siela stopped the final blow, and Victor drove his sword straight through, piercing her chest. When he came back to his senses, he believed Sieg had committed the murder. Siela's dying words to Sieg, beforehand, were “Take care of Delacroix…”—this being the reason why Sieg can't directly kill his friend.

Back in the present time, Victor decides to end his own life, much to Sieg's dismay—the only way to break Azrail's seal is to kill the person who last created the seal or perform a secret ritual sacrifice described in the forbidden book, the Apocrypha of Yzarc. Victor breaks the seal by sacrificing himself. Azrail is then released and fights Sieg, not only in its own diabolical form, but also re-spawned in the figure of a darkened, corrupted Siela to intimidate him. However, Sieg prevails.

After all the chaos, Sieg mounts a tribute to Victor and Siela, and mourns over the loss of his two best friends, but Arcia cheers him up.

=== Characters ===
- Sieg Wahrheit (German words for "Victory" and "Truth"): The main character of the story, and a young Knight of the Dark Glyphs. He is a "Legionator", who is able to sacrifice lost souls in order to summon creatures called Chaos Legion from alternate worlds —with the forbidden power of the darkest of Glyphs, bestowed unto him by edict of the Order. Following the commands of the Order, Sieg and his fellow knights combined their powers to seal the “Spirit of Purification” and close the gateway to “Chaos” forever. Fighting side by side in battles of the past, Sieg became close friends with Victor. The Order selects Sieg to track down Victor—his former friend who has now gone rogue, when he steals the forbidden book Apocrypha of Yzarc (from the English word “Crazy” spelt backwards)—, and use his legions to put a stop to his actions.
- Victor Delacroix ("De la croix" is French for "of the Cross"): Once anticipated by the Order to be the next "Lord of the Sacred Glyphs"; became a "fallen angel" in his dogged quest to purify the world by collecting the Three Sacred Glyphs. His personality changes and migration to the dark side seemed to be brought on by the death of his lover, Siela. The Order he once served and thought so highly of him is now his enemy, especially after he murders a leader of the Order and steals the Apocrypha of Yzarc. Eventually, Sieg confronts him..., and they face the tragedy of the past that stands between them.
- Siela Riviere (Lithuanian for "Soul" and French for "River"): A "Healer" and servant of the Order. She was the only one Sieg and Victor both could trust. However, she was killed in a tragic accident three years ago. She is only seen in "flashback" sequences during the course of the plot, and at the end, appearing as the final enemy.
- Arcia Rinslet: A Maiden of the Silver, one of several female warriors toting twin silver guns. Alongside her fellow Maidens, is dispatched by the "Intelligence of the Order" to purify towns of demons that have been unleashed by Victor. However, Intelligence was unaware that Arcia bears a vendetta against Victor, who recently slew her only brother. Alongside Sieg, she pursues him to avenge her family.

==== Chaos Legion ====
Sieg has the power to handle the Chaos Legion. The Legion is composed by seven legions, each one with their own abilities and characteristics:

- Guilt: Sword Legion. Attacks furiously with their broadswords.
- Hatred: Power Legion. Uses hand-to-hand combat and extremely powerful counter-attacks.
- Malice: Arrow Legion. Archers that attack with crossbows.
- Arrogance: Shield Legion. A defensive legion that can absorb any type of damage before their shields releases significant energy blast at short range.
- Flawed: Claw Legion. Agile legion that uses a pair of long claws as weapons.
- Blasphemy: Bomb Legion. Self-destructs as an attack mechanism and long range grenades.
- Thanatos: The Ultimate Legion and the strongest one in the game. It changes forms as you upgrade it, starting out as an egg, then a dragon-like creature with jagged metal wings, then finally changing into its "perfect" form: an angelic being with large wings. Its attacks consist of warping around and punching enemies, as well as slowing down time to fire blasts of energy that home in on enemies. Sieg possesses this legion at the beginning of the game, but loses it at the end of the first stage. To regain it, the player must find all nine Thanatos' fragments, or chips, and it is necessary to replay certain stages to find them all.

== Music ==
The music and soundtrack of Chaos Legion is composed by Hideyuki Fukasawa.

== Reception ==
Reception

Aggregate score
Aggregator	Score	
Aggregator	PC	PS2
Metacritic	37/100	65/100

Review scores
Publication	Score	
Publication	PC	PS2
Computer Games Magazine	1.5/5	N/A
Computer Gaming World	1.5/5	N/A
Electronic Gaming Monthly	N/A	7.83/10
Eurogamer	N/A	7/10
Famitsu	N/A	30/40
Game Informer	N/A	8.5/10
GamePro	N/A	3/5
GameRevolution	N/A	C−
GameSpot	4.5/10	5.1/10
GameSpy	1/5	2/5
GameZone	N/A	6.5/10
IGN	N/A	6.5/10
Official U.S. PlayStation Magazine	N/A	3.5/5
PC Gamer (US)	24%	N/A
Maxim	N/A	8/10
Playboy	N/A	63%

The PlayStation 2 version received "mixed" reviews, while the PC version received "unfavorable" reviews, according to the review aggregation website Metacritic. In Japan, Famitsu gave the PS2 version a score of 30 out of 40. Many game magazines gave the same console version average to positive reviews months before its U.S. release. AllGame gave it two-and-a-half stars out of five and said that it "starts out promising and gradually becomes more tedious the further you delve into it. It's repetitive, and it's repetitive not because of the sheer number of enemies thrown at you or the simplistic nature of objectives, but because of the paltry set of moves you can initiate with the main character." Edge gave it six out of ten and said that it "tests neither the reactions nor the brain enough to hold your interest."
