= No Greater Love (1996 film) =

1996 TV film based on a Danielle Steel novel

- DVD cover
- Genre: Drama; Romance
- Based on: No Greater Love by Danielle Steel
- Written by: Carmen Culver
- Directed by: Richard T. Heffron
- Starring: Kelly Rutherford; Chris Sarandon; Nicholas Campbell; Daniel Hugh Kelly; Michael Landes; Gina Philips; Simon MacCorkindale
- Music by: Billy Goldenberg
- Country of origin: United States
- Original language: English

Production
- Executive producer: Douglas S. Cramer
- Producer: Christopher Morgan
- Production locations: RMS Queen Mary - 1126 Queens Highway, Long Beach, California; Los Angeles; Montreal
- Cinematography: Pierre Mignot
- Editor: Michael S. Murphy
- Running time: 105 minutes
- Production companies: The Cramer Company; NBC Productions

Original release
- Network: NBC
- Release: January 1, 1996

No Greater Love, also known as Danielle Steel's No Greater Love, is a 1996 American made-for-television romantic drama film directed by Richard T. Heffron. The film is based upon the 1991 novel of the same name written by Danielle Steel.

== Plot ==
In 1912, aboard the RMS Titanic, the wealthy Winfield family heads to the United States; 20-year-old Edwina enjoys her engagement to Charles Fitzgerald and she is surrounded by her parents Kate and Bert, her brothers George and Teddy, and younger sister Alexis, who is celebrating her sixth birthday. On the night of April 14, the ship hits an iceberg and soon starts to sink. While heading to the life boats, panic breaks out and Alexis is nowhere to be found. Kate convinces Edwina to go into a boat with Teddy and stays behind herself to look for Alexis. After the sinking, Edwina is able to lift George from the water and they are eventually saved by RMS Carpathia. Edwina, George and Teddy soon find out that Alexis has survived the disaster, but that their parents and Charles didn't.

Upon arriving in Boston, Edwina tries to adjust to a normal life, but the traumatic experience has a great effect on her. She is advised to send the children away to their aunt, but she is determined to raise them alone, not wanting to neglect the family newspaper company. George is planning on dropping out of high school to become a theater director and Alexis runs away from home for a night when she learns that her mother had a chance to go on a lifeboat, but chose to stay with her husband. Edwina refuses a proposal from a man named Ben Jones, explaining she still isn't over the death of her fiancée. Ten years go by. George was forced to go to Harvard University and later had to take over the newspaper. Edwina is mad at him for ignoring his responsibilities for the theater. She eventually decides to sell the newspaper and allows George to follow his dream and become a professional stage director.

At the premiere of George's first professional play, Edwina meets Sam Horowitz, the father of Helen Horowitz, the lead actress George is in love with. Alexis is seduced by the older womanizing actor Malcolm Stone, much to the distress of Edwina. The rebellious Alexis doesn't stop seeing him and she accompanies him to nightclubs, where she is introduced to cocaine. Edwina tries to break them up, but this only leads to an estrangement from her. On the day of George and Helen's marriage ceremony, she runs away from home. Edwina follows her to England and aboards a ship for the first time since the disaster. She initially refuses to leave her cabin, afraid of the memories.

The first time on the deck, she meets Englishman Patrick Kelly. He immediately shows interest in her, but she is still reluctant to allow herself to love someone. In London, they spend all their time looking for Alexis and find out she is heading to Paris for the weekend. In the meantime, she agrees to stay with Patrick and they give in to their feelings for each other. Although knowing he is a married man, she spends a few nights with him and then reluctantly leaves him. She eventually locates Alexis and finds out she is married to Malcolm. She threatens to sue him for kidnapping and rape and tries to convince Alexis to go with her. Before leaving with her, Alexis admits that Malcolm drugged her. Back in Boston, the Winfield family is finally reunited and George and Helen announce they will have a baby. Edwina stops being mad at her mother for not going into a lifeboat and she is courted by Sam.

== Cast ==
=== Fictional characters ===
- Kelly Rutherford as Edwina Winfield
- Chris Sarandon as Sam Horowitz
- Nicholas Campbell as Malcolm Stone
- Daniel Hugh Kelly as Ben Jones
- Michael Landes as George Winfield
- Gina Philips as Alexis 'Lexie' Winfield
  - Sarah Freeman as Six-year-old Alexis 'Lexie' Winfield
- Simon MacCorkindale as Patrick Kelly
- Christopher C. Fuller as Charles Fitzgerald
- Carole Ruggier as Carpathia Stewardess
- Susan Hogan as Kate Winfield
- Daniel Pilon as Bert Winfield
- Sarah Freeman as Mary
- Hayden Christensen as Teddy Winfield
  - Ryan Floyd and Alex Floyd as Baby Teddy Winfield
- Polly Shannon as Helen Horowitz
- John Saint Ryan as Titanic Officer with Moustache

=== Historical characters ===
From footage of S.O.S. Titanic (1979):

- Harry Andrews as Captain Edward John Smith
- Peter Bourke as Harold Bride
- Kevin O'Shea as Lookout Reginald Robinson Lee
- Alec Sabin as Lookout Frederick Fleet and Jack Phillips
- Malcolm Stoddard as Second Officer Charles Lightoller
- Geoffrey Whitehead as Thomas Andrews
- Paul Young as First Officer William McMaster Murdoch

== Production ==
Filming took place in Montreal and Los Angeles, and had been scheduled to wrap up in early January 1995 but was still reported as ongoing later that month. Kelly Rutherford stated that many of the scenes in the opening Titanic sequence were filmed aboard the Queen Mary in Long Beach, and while she said she believed stock footage had been used in some scenes, she did not identify the source of that footage. Rutherford also stated that the production began in Montreal. It was labelled a mini-series in promotional stories prior to its release. Stock footage of the Titanic sinking and iceberg collision was obtained from the 1979 film S.O.S. Titanic.

== Reception ==
The film received largely negative reviews.

AllMovie review gave it 2.5 out of 5 stars.

Steven Scheuer for King Features Syndicate briefly stated that the film had good performances and "an engaging plot"; but even so, the film was only rated at 2 of 4 stars.

Andy Webb for The Movie Scene stated that several of the scenes feel as though they were "cram[med] in", which indicated to Webb that the piece was originally intended to be a mini-series rather than the 105 minutes it ended up as. Webb also stated that the film was "quite good" for a Danielle Steel movie, with good costumes and camera work. He also complimented Rutherford for her performance, especially considering the "stiff dialogue". Regardless, Webb also felt the film was "convoluted rather than entertaining." He rated it with 3 of 5 stars.

Variety's Todd Everett found the acting to be "adequate" and felt that Heffron, Mignot and production designer Normand Sarrazin incorporated the filming locations well. And while he commented that Culver's script was sometimes witty, he also noted that it was historically incongruous with respect to interpersonal interactions and character motivation.

John Martin of The New York Times, gave a biting review, beginning with saying "No Duller Movie" would be a more fitting title. Martin commented that while the scenes involving the Titanic were better than expected, the film became overly dramatic and ended abruptly. He also said the movie feels as though it should have been a mini-series, and praised Rutherford's acting.

Kirk Nicewonger, for United Feature Syndicate, found the script to be trite, and Edwina's character in particular unappealing. Nicewonger commented that the film fell short of the tone of sacrifice it meant to strike as Edwina made it clear that she required substantial wealth to consider a suitor. Mike Hughes' column, as printed in the Lansing State Journal, began by calling the movie "awful" and proceeded to lambast the film and the script, as well as Rutherford's acting.

By the time the film showed in England, it had been rated with 1 of 4 stars, and when the film ran in 1998, David Bianculli warned viewers not to waste time watching it.

== See also ==
- List of films about the RMS Titanic
