= Pariah (video game) =

2005 video game

- Developer: Digital Extremes
- Publishers: NA: Groove Games; EU: Hip Games
- Designer: James Schmalz
- Composers: Dustin Crenna; Tim Larkin; Starsky Partridge; Greg Rahn
- Engine: Unreal Engine 2
- Platforms: Microsoft Windows, Xbox
- Release: NA: May 3, 2005; EU: May 6, 2005; AU: May 25, 2005 (Xbox)
- Genre: First-person shooter
- Modes: Single-player, multiplayer

Pariah is a first-person shooter video game developed by Digital Extremes. It was released in May 2005 for Microsoft Windows and Xbox. It uses a modified version of the Unreal Engine 2 and the Havok physics engine. A PlayStation 2 version was also in development but cancelled.

== Gameplay ==
Pariah features standard first-person shooter gameplay, largely influenced by the Unreal franchise, particularly Unreal 2 (whose game engine Pariah is based on). The single-player and multiplayer modes include drivable vehicles that can be utilized in combat scenarios. One of the standout features is the incorporation of collectible weapon energy cores, which are used to upgrade the player's weapons, granting them additional features and increased power. Each weapon in the game can be upgraded a maximum of three times.

== Synopsis ==
Pariah notably omits to explain key background information about the plot and the in-game universe to the player, thus causing much of the story to progress without any context or background for the player to identify with. Even at the end of the game, many key plot points remain largely unexplained, leaving it up to the player to conjecture about what really happened.

=== Setting ===
The game takes place 30 years after mankind fought a devastating war against an enemy known as "The Shroud". Exactly who or what the Shroud are is never actually explained. At the end of the game, they are shown to be hairless humans with corpse-white skin and highly advanced technology, although whether they are aliens, terrorists, mutants, or something else is never clearly revealed. Supposedly, the Shroud were vanquished 30 years ago, but their reappearance toward the end of the game indicates that this is not true.

In the wake of the war, a large portion of the Earth is now an uncivilized wasteland known as "the Zone", inhabited by Scavengers, the violent descendants of prisoners and convicts who were released by the Shroud during the war. Human civilization is now controlled by a government known as the Alliance. According to the game manual, the Alliance mostly lives in off-world colonies on other planets, but this is never shown or mentioned in the game.

=== Main plot ===
Jack Mason is a medic for the Alliance, tasked with transporting a cryogenically frozen woman named Karina from the maximum security prison "the Anvil" to Alliance headquarters. While flying over "the Zone", Mason's ship is shot down by a surface-to-air missile, crash-landing on Earth. Mason is accidentally infected with the mysterious transgenic virus that Karina is carrying, and she escapes in the chaos that follows as Scavengers arrive at the crash site attempting to capture her. The pilot, Stubbs, is killed in the fracas, but Mason manages to outfight them and the Mercenaries. Mason suspects there is an unusual nature behind the apparent Scavenger attack, as they were not known to possess surface-to-air missiles.

Although Karina is highly distrustful of Mason, her former captor, the two of them team up to evade the Mercenaries. Mason observes that Karina possesses bizarre powers granted to her by the virus; when experiencing strong emotions, she involuntarily produces an explosive effect that creates mass destruction while leaving her unharmed. Eventually, Mason and Karina succeed in radioing the Alliance for help, only to learn that Colonel Stockton, the Warden of "the Anvil", has ordered the Alliance to nuke the area and kill everything that moves, supposedly to contain the infection and prevent the spread of the virus. Karina is soon captured by Alliance Security, and Mason finds himself fighting against the very organization he works for.

As Mason infiltrates "the Anvil" to retake Karina from Stockton, he finds the Mercenaries have also launched a massive assault against the Anvil for revenge. It becomes evident that Stockton masterminded the attack on Mason's transport and that he has paid off the Mercenaries to capture Karina for him. However, it turns out that Stockton has double crossed the Mercenaries by allowing The Alliance to capture Karina for himself and refusing to pay them. Stockton is obsessed with battling the Shroud and wants to use the virus Karina carries as a weapon against them. The Alliance had deemed Stockton's research dangerous, which led him to continue his project in secret.

Karina is a weapon created by the Shroud 30 years ago, but she was captured by the Alliance (specifically, Stockton's father) and cryogenically frozen. The virus she carries allows its host to generate massive amounts of energy from their bodies. This energy can be used to power Shroud weaponry and even to create a natural energy shield around the host's body. However, the virus and the energy it produces are also unstable, and hosts have a tendency to explode.

When Mason finally confronts Stockton, he learns that Stockton has infected himself with the virus, and gained the ability to produce an energy-shield, as well as the ability to operate a Shroud energy weapon, the "Titan's Fist". The Shroud soon attack to capture Karina, and Stockton proceeds to use his newfound powers to battle them.

Stockton attacks Mason to ensure that there is only one virus carrier, and Mason succeeds in killing him and retrieves Karina. Karina pleads with Mason to escape together with her far away from the conflict, but surprisingly Mason betrays her by turning her over to the Shroud. Mason is revealed as a traitor to the Alliance who has been collaborating with the Shroud from the start. His task was to retrieve Karina and deliver her to the Shroud. After turning Karina over, Mason questions the Shroud about his daughter, who had died some time prior to the game. The Shroud hint that they have the ability to bring the dead back to life but insist that Mason perform more "errands" for them before he will be allowed to see his daughter again. Mason then realizes that the Shroud will never honor their end of the bargain, and goes on a one-man rampage through the Shroud outpost using his viral powers and the "Titan's Fist". Mason defeats a few dozen Shroud soldiers, finally killing a mysterious viral-powered Shroud woman protected by several Shroud assassins. After finally reaching Karina, he finds her connected to medical equipment draining away her blood. Shroud soldiers close in on the area, and Karina tells Mason that he cannot rescue her, begging him to euthanize her. Mason cannot bring himself to kill Karina, and instead shoots himself. As Karina watches Mason die, her out-of-control emotions produce a massive energy wave that envelops Mason's body and obliterates the Shroud outpost killing everyone.

== Map editor ==
Pariah comes with a map editor used to make multiplayer maps, similar to the ones in the TimeSplitters games and Far Cry: Instincts. Uploaded maps then can be played online or over a LAN.

== Reception ==
Reception

Aggregate score
Aggregator	Score	
Aggregator	PC	Xbox
Metacritic	69/100	70/100

Review scores
Publication	Score	
Publication	PC	Xbox
Computer Games Magazine	2/5	N/A
Computer Gaming World	2.5/5	N/A
Edge	N/A	7/10
Electronic Gaming Monthly	N/A	7.33/10
Eurogamer	N/A	5/10
Game Informer	8.5/10	8.5/10
GameSpot	6.3/10	5.9/10
GameSpy	3/5	2.5/5
GameTrailers	7.8/10	7.8/10
GameZone	6.7/10	7.9/10
IGN	7.8/10	8/10
Official Xbox Magazine (US)	N/A	7/10
PC Gamer (US)	68%	N/A
Detroit Free Press	N/A	2/4
The Times	3/5	3/5

According to review aggregate site Metacritic, the game received average reviews on both platforms. IGN's review stated that, although the PC version was "quite solid in most respects", the gameplay felt dated and the story was "a little bewildering and threadbare". GameSpot's review was critical of the gameplay, pointing out that the game "simply [couldn't] make the act of firing a weapon interesting" partly because of the poor weapon sounds. GameSpy's review noted that the same PC version was released with bugs.

Nigel Kendall of The Times gave the game three stars out of five, saying, "The FPS game definitely needs revitalising by something new and original. This isn't it." However, Ryan Huschka of Detroit Free Press gave the Xbox version two stars out of four, saying, "All told, this game is no pariah. But even with its map maker, co-op mode and upgradeable weapons, Pariah is too flawed to seriously compete with the Xbox's big-name shooters." Jason Hill of The Sydney Morning Herald gave the same console version a similar score of two-and-a-half stars out of five, saying, "Shooters need to be special to stand out, particularly on Halo's home turf, but Pariah fails to excite or innovate."
