= MechWarrior (1993 video game) =

1993 video game

- North American cover art
- Developer: Beam Software
- Publishers: NA/EU: Activision; JP: Victor Musical Industries
- Director: Alfred Milgrom
- Producer: Tom Sloper
- Designer: James Halprin
- Programmer: Andrew Davie
- Artists: Holger Liebnitz; Steve French; Paul Mitchell
- Writer: James Halprin
- Composer: Marshall Parker
- Series: BattleTech/MechWarrior
- Platform: Super NES
- Release: EU: 1993; JP: February 26, 1993; NA: May 1993
- Genre: Sci-fi mech simulation
- Mode: Single-player

MechWarrior, known in Japan as BattleTech (バトルテック), is a first-person action video game for the Super NES set in the BattleTech universe. The SNES game was based upon the original PC MechWarrior, with updated graphics that utilized Mode 7 for the Battlemech mission sequences instead of the PC version's flat-shaded 3D graphics.

The game was followed by a sequel, MechWarrior 3050, which is played from an isometric view.

== Story ==
In 3017 a MechWarrior named Herras Ragenʻs family was killed by a group of military rogues called "The Dark Wing Lance". In 3027, playing as Herras, the player fights enemies, trying to seek out the leader of the rogues while relying on intel from a host of contacts and allies at a bar on a nearby planet in the system. In the end, the player's objective is to hunt down and kill the members of the Dark Wing Lance and avenge the deaths of Herras' family.

== Gameplay ==
=== Mechs ===
Mechwarrior on SNES is unusual for several reasons; one is that the game featured a unique stable of BattleMechs that were developed specifically for the game. Many share similarities or are clear variations of BattleMechs from other games, but others are completely unique. There are four types of BattleMechs in the game; light mechs, medium mechs, heavy mechs, and assault mechs. Light mechs include the Wasp and the Spider. The Spider is agile and typically used for flanking, and the Wasp has powerful jump jets. Medium mechs include the Phoenix Hawk and the Wolverine. The Phoenix Hawk balances all elements and the Wolverine is similar but is slightly slower and better armored. Heavy mechs include the Warhammer and the Battlemaster. These are both heavily armored and have a large amount of firepower. The only assault mech is the Atlas which is the strongest and slowest mech in the game.

== Reception ==
Reception

Aggregate score
Aggregator	Score
GameRankings	66.50% (SNES)

Review scores
Publication	Score
Power Unlimited	85/100
Cambridge Evening News	84%

Super Gamer gave the SNES version a review score of 88%, stating: "The official BattleTech game has you fighting hordes of giant robots in an atmospheric, Mode 7 first person perspective." Power Unlimited gave the game a score of 85% writing: "Mechwarrior is based around a rather unique formula. It is a pity that gathering information at the beginning of the game is boring and tedious. However, the action that follows later is excellent." On the Internet Game Data Base, BattleMech has a user rating of 6.5 stars out of 10. On Video Game Geek, BattleMech is user rated 5 stars out 10
