= No Greater Love (novel) =

1991 novel by Danielle Steel

- First edition
- Author: Danielle Steel
- Language: English
- Publisher: Delacorte Press
- Publication date: 1991
- Publication place: United kingdom
- Pages: 392
- ISBN: 978-0-385-29909-1

No Greater Love is a novel by Danielle Steel. It tells a fictional story based on the true event of the sinking of the RMS Titanic. It is Steel's 28th novel.

== Plot summary ==
In 1912, after visiting her aunt and uncle in England, Edwina Winfield, her parents, younger siblings and her fiancé, Charles, travel back to the United States on the maiden voyage of the RMS Titanic. When the ship sinks, Edwina's fiancé and her parents die. After being rescued, Edwina and her siblings return to their home in San Francisco, where Edwina takes on the responsibility of raising her younger siblings. Some of her friends want Edwina to move on and find a new fiancé, and Ben, a family attorney, falls in love with her but Edwina doesn't want to marry, only raise her new family.

Edwina's father was the owner of a newspaper, and Edwina helps keep the newspaper running, expecting her oldest brother, Philip, to take over once he's finished his education at Harvard. However, Philip enlists in the army during World War I and dies in combat. A younger brother, George, tries to help but has no interest in the newspaper and eventually leaves for Hollywood, wanting to become a movie producer. Edwina sells the newspaper and also inherit money from the aunt in England. George finds success in Hollywood and the younger sister Alexis desperately wants to be a movie actress. She runs off with a much older man, to England. Edwina goes after her, stepping on a boat for the first time since the Titanic disaster more than a decade earlier. On the boat, she falls in love with a man who turns out to be a cousin of her fiancé Charles. They have a short love affair but he is (unhappily) married and can not divorce because he is a Catholic. When she returns to the US, Edwina realizes she is now over Charles and can move on with her life and that she is in love with Sam, George's father-in-law, a movie producer.

== Adaptations ==
The novel was the basis for a made-for-TV movie, No Greater Love (1996), starring Kelly Rutherford.

== Reception ==
Publishers Weekly called the novel "predictably sentimental."
