= MechWarrior 4: Vengeance =

2000 video game

- Developers: FASA Interactive; Tsunami Visual Technologies (arcade)
- Publisher: Microsoft
- Producer: T. J. Wagner
- Composer: Duane Decker
- Series: MechWarrior
- Platforms: Windows, Arcade
- Release: NA: November 22, 2000; EU: February 2, 2001; JP: October 26, 2001; Black Knight: NA: November 2, 2001; EU: November 23, 2001
- Genre: Vehicle simulation
- Modes: Single-player, multiplayer

MechWarrior 4: Vengeance is a vehicle simulation game, developed by FASA Interactive and published by Microsoft. It was released on November 22, 2000. It is the fourth game in the MechWarrior series. It takes place in the BattleTech universe where the pinnacle of all war machines are huge, heavily armed robots called BattleMechs. The player pilots one of these "'Mechs" and uses a variety of available weapons (autocannons, lasers, missiles, and more) to battle enemy 'Mechs, tanks and other vehicles. An expansion pack, MechWarrior 4: Black Knight, was released in 2001, and a subsequent stand-alone expansion, MechWarrior 4: Mercenaries, was released on November 7, 2002. Two smaller expansions, Inner Sphere Mech Pak and Clan Mech Pak, were also released in 2002.

== Plot ==
The game takes place on the Inner Sphere planet Kentares IV and its moon. Players take control of Ian Dresari, son of famed Clan War hero Duke Eric Dresari and heir to the throne of Kentares IV.

A civil war erupts on Kentares IV after William Dresari, Ian's cousin, betrays the family and seizes the throne under the banner of Katherine "Katrina" Steiner. Steiner is the ruler of the Lyran Alliance and responsible for the annihilation of loyalists to Victor Steiner-Davion, Katrina's brother. After a surprise attack by Steiner forces on the Dresari royal palace, leaving Eric Dresari and the majority of the royal family dead, Ian meets up with his uncle, Sir Peter Dresari, on the moon orbiting Kentares IV to launch a guerrilla campaign against Steiner. Ian fights alongside fellow Resistance MechWarriors, Casey Nolan, Jen McQuarrie, Jules Gonzales, and their commander Elise Rathburn, in various missions. The Resistance eventually leaves the moon and sets up camp on Kentares IV's arctic regions. At one point during the campaign, Ian's uncle Peter is murdered by Duncan Burke, a high-ranking officer in Katrina's forces. Ian and the Resistance are devastated by the loss and debate over whether or not to continue the fight for Kentares' freedom. They decide to push forward, capturing a satellite network from Steiner. The rebel group moves into the mountains.

After destroying a disabled but heavily guarded Steiner dropship, Ian and the Resistance move to the Hadra Peninsula, a remote desert region. Rumors of an abandoned prison camp reach the Resistance and efforts are made to locate and liberate it in order to enlist more personnel for the Resistance. Ian is shocked to find that one member of his family survived Steiner's siege of the Dresari palace: his sister Joanna. After a short reunion, Ian and Joanna are separated again as the Resistance mobilizes to assault Steiner's stronghold. They make a brief detour to save the coastal town of Vale after Steiner threatens to bomb the town due to allegations of links to the Resistance. Not only does the Resistance save the population, but Ian defeats his uncle's murderer, Duncan Burke, in a heated duel.

Pushing into the cities, the fighting heats up and Resistance casualties mount. Joanna informs Ian of an old armory cache hidden somewhere in the city, invaluable for assaulting the Dresari palace, now the headquarters for the Steiner occupation. Right before the Resistance prepares to locate the armory, Joanna and her Lance are ambushed by Steiner forces, leaving her wounded and in mortal danger. Ian makes a choice, between rescuing his sister from certain death or securing the weapons cache. Whatever the player chooses, Ian and the Resistance fight one last battle against House Steiner at the palace, putting an end to the war. However, the fight is not yet over for Ian, as William shows up in a modified Daishi, challenging Ian to a duel. Ian defeats William and finally frees the planet from Steiner's grasp.

Depending on the player's choice before the penultimate mission, either Joanna or Ian will ascend the throne as Duchess/Duke.

=== Black Knight ===
Mechwarrior's expansion, Black Knight, takes place several years after Vengeance, and gets its name from the organization of mercenaries the plot revolves around. The Black Knight Legion fall under the employ of the Lyran Alliance, who wish to reclaim Kentares IV from Ian Dresari. Ian chose to find the weapons cache, leading to his sister's death, resulting in many of his allies abandoning him. House Steiner, unwilling to pay the Legion mercenaries for their fulfilled contracts, decides it would be much cheaper to betray the Legion, and nearly wipes it out in a surprise attack. Legion remnants seek justice against Maj. Clarissa Dupree, mastermind of the Lyran attack against the legion, while also continuing with their mission to overthrow Dresari. They eventually find and kill Ian on Kentares, then travel to Voltrat III to find Steiner liaison Clarissa Dupree. Eric McClair, CO of the Legion, defeats Maj. Dupree in single combat, destroying her Mad Cat MkII, then proceeds to shooting her ejection pod, killing her instantly. The final cutscene is a commercial advertising the Black Knight Legion, citing their success against both Steiner and Dresari.

Black Knight was developed by Cyberlore in tandem with FASA Studio and would further develop both the InnerSphere and Clan Mech Packs - alongside the stand-alone expansion Mercenaries.

== Gameplay ==
Cockpit view, two Shadowcat mechs visible

Mechwarrior 4 is a first-person mecha simulation game, with the player piloting a Mech in each mission. Mechs are armored and fitted with various projectile and energy weapons, and engage in combat with other Mechs as well as traditional military vehicles such as tanks and helicopters, and occasional weapon emplacements. During combat, a Mech's weapons and critical components can be damaged, and it is even possible for entire limbs to be blown off a Mech.

Mech customization is a major aspect of gameplay. The player has significant control over the configuration of each of his or her Mechs, from the type and amount of armor used and some internal components to all of the Mech's weaponry and ammunition. In the campaign, additional Battlemechs and weapons are acquired through the missions from battlefield/looting salvage and as rewards for success. The Mech configuration system has been overhauled and made to be more realistic, where now mechs had certain "hardpoints" where only specific types of weaponry could fit onto it, as opposed to the previous approach the games took where slots could be filled with any type of weaponry. Ammunition itself is now carried within the weaponry emplaced on the mech.

In the campaign, the player controls up to three squadmates, with the ability to issue basic orders such as attack and move.

=== Campaign ===
The 26 campaign missions are made up of seven "ops", each with different environments, and each 'op' containing about 3-6 missions. In the first few missions, only a few smaller mechs are available. As the game progresses, more mechs and weapons are at the player's disposal. These come in the form of salvage from previous missions. Between missions, the player can outfit mechs with different weapons and also assign mechs to one of their three Lancemate slots.

=== Instant Action ===
This mode lets players play with all mechs in the game. Players can pick a campaign mission or a wave-mission in which they can select up to four other mechs and fight them deathmatch-style. The map is randomly selected and the player is faced with three enemy mechs to fight. The player has to successively destroy all three enemies in a one-on-one fight.

=== Multiplayer ===
The game features several multiplayer modes: Deathmatch with several twists such as points awarded for damage dealt; Capture the flag and King of the Hill with two modes, Deathmatch and team-based; escort mode that pits two teams against each other, each with the goal of destroying the other's VIP; and Steal the Beacon, in which players fight for possession of a beacon, that, when carried, will award the carrier points.

=== Expansions ===
Black Knight expansion pack was released in 2001. It featured a new dynamic campaign, and it added five mechs, six vehicles, and five multiplayer modes to the game. Two smaller expansions were released in 2002: Inner Sphere 'Mech Pak and Clan 'Mech Pak. Both added four mechs, one multiplayer map, two weapons, and one gadget to the game.

== Reception ==
=== Vengeance ===
MechWarrior 4: Vengeance

Aggregate score
Aggregator	Score
Metacritic	87/100

Review scores
Publication	Score
CNET Gamecenter	9/10
Computer Games Strategy Plus	4/5
Computer Gaming World	4/5
Edge	6/10
EP Daily	9/10
Eurogamer	8/10
Game Informer	8.75/10
GameSpot	8.8/10
GameSpy	91%
IGN	9/10
Next Generation	3/5
PC Gamer (US)	88%
X-Play	5/5

MechWarrior 4: Vengeance received "generally favorable reviews" according to the review aggregation website Metacritic. Chris Kramer of NextGen said of the game, "Knockout graphics and the new gameplay direction aside, this MechWarrior isn't as genre-defining as previous incarnations. A solid game, but not as mind-blowing as MechWarrior 2." Human Tornado of GamePro called it "a very tough simulation, whose great replay value and multiplayer gaming make it one of the top PC games of 2000." (Note: GamePro gave the original game three 5/5 scores for graphics, control, and fun factor, and 4/5 for sound.)

==== Sales ====
Vengeance sold 320,000 units in the U.S. and earned $11.5 million by August 2006, after its release in November 2000. It was the country's 55th best-selling computer game between January 2000 and August 2006. Combined sales of all MechWarrior computer games released between January 2000 and August 2006 had reached 900,000 units in the United States by the latter date.

==== Accolades ====
The staff of Computer Gaming World named it the best "sci-fi sim" of 2000. They wrote, "Although it changed the way things work in BattleTech, it accomplished what Crimson Skies set out to do: Open up the sci-fi genre to non-BattleTech-heads." The staff of Computer Games Magazine nominated it for their 2000 "Sci-Fi Simulation of the Year" award, whose winner remains unknown. The game won the award for Action Game of the Year at the CNET Gamecenter Computer Game Awards for 2000, and was nominated for the Overall Game of the Year award, which went to The Sims. It was also a runner-up for "Simulation of 2000" in both Editors' Choice and Readers' Choice at IGN's Best of 2000 Awards. The game won the "PC Simulation" and "Online Gameplay" awards at the AIAS' 4th Annual Interactive Achievement Awards, and was also nominated for the "PC Game of the Year" and "Game of the Year" awards, both of which went to Diablo II. The game won the award for "Sci-fi Simulation of the Year" at GameSpot's Best and Worst of 2000 Awards, and was nominated for the "Best Graphics, Technical" and "Best Multiplayer Game" awards, which went to Giants: Citizen Kabuto and Half-Life: Counterstrike. The game also won the award for "Sci-fi Simulation of the Year" at GameSpot's Readers' Choice Awards. GameSpy named it their "2000 Simulation Game of the Year". The game was nominated for the "Best Action Game for PC" award at The Electric Playground's Blister Awards 2000, which went to Deus Ex.

==== Awards ====
- E3 2000 Game Critics Awards: Best Simulation Game
- MechWarrior 4: Black Knight Expansion - Sci-Fi Simulation Game of the Year, GameSpot's 2001 readers' choice awards.

=== Black Knight ===
MechWarrior 4: Black Knight

Aggregate score
Aggregator	Score
Metacritic	78/100

Review scores
Publication	Score
Computer Games Magazine	3.5/5
Computer Gaming World	4/5
GameSpot	7.6/10
GameSpy	85%
GameZone	9/10
IGN	8.6/10
PC Gamer (UK)	77%
PC Gamer (US)	80%

The Black Knight expansion pack received "generally favorable reviews", although moderately less than the original MechWarrior 4, according to Metacritic.

It was a nominee for the "Online Gameplay" award at the AIAS' 5th Annual Interactive Achievement Awards, which was ultimately awarded to Return to Castle Wolfenstein.
