= MechWarrior =

Video game series

- MechWarrior logo
- Genres: Vehicle simulation Vehicular combat
- Developers: Dynamix; Activision; Zipper Interactive; FASA Interactive; Tsunami Visual Technologies; Wandering Samurai Studios; Personae Studios; Piranha Games
- Publishers: Activision; Hasbro Interactive; Microsoft; Personae Studios; Infinite Game Publishing; Piranha Games
- Platforms: MS-DOS, X68000, PC-98, Super NES, Genesis, Windows, Mac OS, PlayStation, Saturn, Arcade, iOS
- First release: MechWarrior; 1989
- Latest release: MechWarrior 5: Clans; October 16, 2024

MechWarrior is a series of video games set in the fictional universe of BattleTech.

== Games ==
Release timeline Main series in bold
| 1989 | **MechWarrior** |
1990–1992
| 1993 | **MechWarrior** |
| 1994 | MechWarrior 3050 |
| 1995 | **MechWarrior 2: 31st Century Combat** |
| 1995 | MechWarrior 2: Ghost Bear's Legacy |
| 1996 | MechWarrior 2: Mercenaries |
1997–1998
| 1999 | **MechWarrior 3** |
| 2000 | **MechWarrior 4: Vengeance** |
2001
| 2002 | MechWarrior 4: Mercenaries |
2003–2012
| 2013 | MechWarrior Online |
| 2013 | MechWarrior: Tactical Command |
2014–2018
| 2019 | **MechWarrior 5: Mercenaries** |
2020–2023
| 2024 | MechWarrior 5: Clans |

Within the MechWarrior games, players take control of a single BattleMech and combat other BattleMechs, tanks, infantry, and more, from within the cockpit of their machine. A third-person alternate view is available in MechWarrior 2, 3, 4, Online, and 5. Both MechWarrior 2 and MechWarrior 3 were Origins Award winners, taking Best Fantasy or Science Fiction Computer Game 1995 and Best Action Computer Game 1999 respectively.

== In-universe timeline ==
- MechWarrior takes place at the end of the Third Succession War.
- MechWarrior 2: 31st Century Combat, MechWarrior 2: Ghost Bear's Legacy, Mercenaries, and MechWarrior Online deal with the events soon before, during, and soon after the Clan Invasion of the Inner Sphere.
- MechWarrior 3 and MechCommander are concerned with different parts of "Operation Serpent" and "Operation Bulldog", the combined Inner Sphere counterattack against the Clans, targeted at the Smoke Jaguars.
- MechWarrior 4: Vengeance, its expansions, and MechCommander 2 deal with the Federated Commonwealth Civil War.
- MechWarrior 5: Mercenaries takes place during the Third Succession War.
- MechWarrior 5: Clans takes place during the Clan Invasion of the Inner Sphere.

== Live-action film ==
Electric Entertainment, a Hollywood production company founded by Dean Devlin, currently holds the option to produce a feature film based on the MechWarrior universe. In 2003, Devlin approached Paramount to pitch the project but failed to receive funding. The project is in development limbo.

== See also ==
- MechWarrior (role-playing game), a 1986 tabletop game
