= MechWarrior Online =

2013 video game

- Developer: Piranha Games
- Publishers: Infinite Game Publishing; Piranha Games (since 2014)
- Series: MechWarrior
- Engine: CryEngine 3
- Platform: Microsoft Windows
- Release: WW: September 17, 2013
- Genre: Vehicle simulation
- Mode: Multiplayer

MechWarrior Online is a free-to-play vehicle simulation video game, officially launched during September 2013 by Piranha Games for Microsoft Windows. The game takes place within the larger BattleTech universe.

== Gameplay ==
Players control large bipedal combat vehicles known as battlemechs and compete against other players. Winning battles against other players grants the winner experience and "c-bills" for future purchases and customization. The game features a variety of gameplay modes, including deathmatch, King of the Hill, and Conquest mode in which each team must secure and hold locations around the map. The game also features a faction warfare system in which players align themselves with various factions and must secure control of planets on behalf of their own faction.

== Development ==
=== Collaborating with Smith & Tinker on Mechwarrior: 3015 ===
Jordan Weisman, co-creator of BattleTech and co-founder of FASA, is also the founder of the software firm Smith & Tinker. He negotiated the BattleTech/MechWarrior license back from Microsoft, which had left the property sit idle for several years since abandoning the series after Mechwarrior 4: Mercenaries in 2002 and cancelling FASA Studios' potential Mechwarrior 5. Russ Bullock from Piranha Games was a long-time fan of the series and wanted to start a joint collaboration with Weisman. He contacted Weisman to develop a prototype project that would become the new iteration in the MechWarrior series of video games. Pre-production of the new MechWarrior game first began in October 2008, when the two studios started discussing the project on pen and paper. After coming up with a presentation for a prototype scenario, both studios began ramping up a prototype to pitch the new game to potential publishers in March 2009. The game was titled Mechwarrior: 3015 and its premise was the following:

This new MechWarrior is set on the planet Deshler in the year 3015, and places players in the role of Adrian Khol, a wayward nobleman who prefers partying and shirking responsibility over his training and studies. However, when House Kurita launches a massive invasion to conquer Deshler, resulting in the death of his entire family, Khol discovers a purpose to fight for.

PGI and Smith & Tinker developed a vertical slice developed in Unreal Engine 3 due to PGI's familiarity with the engine for Transformers 2. They planned "to have a full single-player campaign, as well as support for a four-player co-op campaign, and a full multiplayer suite."

They arranged with IGN to publish the trailer and a feature article interviewing Weisman and Bullock about the project and the premise. The published trailer with supposed in-game footage was released on 9 July 2009, depicting a House Davion Warhammer fighting an invading House Kurita in the form of a Jenner and an Atlas on Deshler in 3015. The words "in-game footage", clearly seen in the trailer, caused confusion among fans. At the time it was created, the intent was to attract a publisher. So, PGI used the UE3 game engine to demonstrate what a new MechWarrior game might look like. UE3 was stated as the logical engine of choice, since PGI had familiarity with UE3 from their previous projects.

While pitching this vertical slice to publishers, PGI and Smith & Tinker were not successful in getting funding. The IP contractual obligations with Microsoft stated that the game could only be released on Xbox and PC, so that automatically excluded the PlayStation userbase and therefore limited the potential return of investment for third-party publishers. These conditions were worsened by the Great Recession and caused a lack of publishers willing to fund Smith & Tinker's and PGI's singleplayer Mechwarrior: 3015 concept. As Weisman, Ekman and Bullock wrote in the first dev blog post for Mechwarrior: Online:

"The hard work began in earnest after the video release. We had an aggressive schedule to visit publishers and gauge interest. In the month of August we met with all of the major publishers, pitched the MechWarrior game to a captive audience and waited. The answers rolled in slowly, starting with the smaller publishers. Then word showed up from the big five. The answer was no.

We knew going in, there were two major risks. No PS3 version due to a Microsoft restriction, and the epic market collapse and major recession. In the end, it was mostly the lack of a PS3 option that did us in. The scope and budget required to develop a console reboot needed the support of a PS3 SKU and we just couldn't convince publishers to take a risk. By late fall 2009, our dreams of making a MechWarrior game, began slowly drifting away.

Through the end of 2009 and into 2010 we rallied numerous times, reducing scope and budget, re-pitching the concept as a LIVE only title, etc. etc. In the end, nothing stuck."

=== Retooling into Mechwarrior: Online ===
The vertical slice and project pitch did not manage to land any third-party publisher and Microsoft was not willing to back the project, despite Mechwarrior being their own IP. Additionally, because the trailer featured the unseen Warhammer design; IGN also received a Cease & Desist from Harmony Gold that forced them to pull down the trailer, although the trailer is still easily found on YouTube. The C&D from Harmony Gold did not have any effect on the viability of landing a publishing deal for a Mechwarrior project:

Contrary to all the press and speculation that Harmony Gold was getting in the way of a deal or development, this had no impact whatsoever on development or signing a deal for MechWarrior.

After not being able to land a publishing deal, Smith & Tinker and PGI went their separate ways, but now PGI had the ear of Microsoft to license the Mechwarrior IP from them through their contact with Smith & Tinker. Since PGI already had experience with multiplayer games and because it was relatively cheaper to develop within the deathmatch multiplayer genre, they downscaled the Mechwarrior project into a multiplayer-only game and "Offers were coming in from all over the planet, especially to make or license a free-to-play MechWarrior game.". They also chose to change engine into CryEngine 3 and hired Battletech artist Alex Iglesias to redesign the mechs, thereby making the previous Mechwarrior: 3015 trailer's in-game footage no longer applicable. The lower costs of a multiplayer-only game made it possible to attract venture capital from Infinite Game Publishing to help PGI hire more people and put resources into a late Alpha/beta version of what would be known as Mechwarrior: Online.

The official title of MechWarrior Online came later in development. In October 2011, a Twitter campaign was launched as the start of the advertising campaign. Little tidbits of info, dev blogs, and concept art were released about the title. At the Game Developer's Conference (GDC) in March 2012, PGI unveiled the first trailer for Mechwarrior: Online in its early closed beta state. On May 22, 2012, Piranha Games announced the start of closed beta testing for Mechwarrior Online. Later in 2012, PGI announced the Founder's Program that allowed players to purchase early access to the closed beta and get one to four mechs, depending on which tier they chose to buy. The Founders Program was successful and generated $5 million.

The game was scheduled to enter open Beta on October 16, 2012, but the date was pushed back due to stability and playability issues. Open Beta commenced on October 29, 2012.

The game was officially released on September 17, 2013.

On September 1, 2014, Piranha Games acquired the game's publishing rights from Infinite Games Publishing.

== Marketing and release ==
As a pre-purchase promotion, MechWarrior Online offered three tiers of Founders packages—Legendary, Elite, and Veteran—all of which provided advanced beta access. Founders packages also offered exclusive perks scaled based on price, including months of premium account access, in-game currency and Founder's Mechs. The Atlas was the first Founder's Mech to be unveiled. It made its debut in the first week of August 2012. The remaining three Mechs were the Hunchback, Jenner, and Catapult, for a total of four. Each Mech sported a unique paint job and unique in-game bonuses. The Founders program officially ended on October 14, 2012. The Founder's Packs raised more than US$5 million.

Project Phoenix packages were announced on June 25, 2013. The package has four tiers, offering a new BattleMech from each weight class, along with premium time and cockpit items. The packages were delivered on October 15, 2013. An additional package, the Saber Reinforcement, including two further medium class BattleMechs, was unveiled on August 28, 2013.

On July 23, 2013, Piranha Games added a custom BattleMech for a player's daughter who died of cancer. The proceeds were donated to the Canadian Cancer Society. At the end of the charity drive, over US$122,000 was donated.

On December 13, 2013, PGI introduced new Mech Packages that include Clan Mechs. Gold-plated mechs were also announced. Player backlash over the gold plated mechs noted the high price of the packages for a small free-to-play game, as well as the addition of such items while other player-requested features have not been addressed.

On September 14, 2014, PGI introduced a second Clan Mech Package that included the 2nd wave of Clan Mechs. Each package includes a custom chosen warhorn, mug and colors of any one of the chosen clans, increasing every time the next package was bought. If the player had previously bought the top tier package of the first Clan Mech package, they would receive the bonus Mech of the 2nd package. Clan packages would be sent to players who ordered them on December 16.

On October 22, 2014, PGI introduced an Inner Sphere Mech package, Named Resistance. Each package included a badge and a faction pack. Each faction pack was doubled for each higher tier.

The game was released for Steam on December 10, 2015 with a peak concurrent player count of 4,111 players.

== Legal issues ==
=== 2009: Harmony Gold takes down the Mechwarrior: 3015 trailer featuring the Warhammer ===
On September 3, 2009, shortly after posting preview videos and images of the game, IGN was issued a cease and desist order by Harmony Gold USA (owners of the Robotech franchise), citing copyright infringement over the use of several BattleMech designs allegedly based on mecha designs derived from the Macross series. Specifically, the trailer for MechWarrior featured the Warhammer, which is similar in design to the Destroid Tomahawk from the Macross and Robotech series. The Warhammer, as well as several other BattleMechs, such as the Marauder and Archer, were an important part of the early BattleTech universe and image, but were based on images from Macross and other mecha anime series that FASA had licensed from the original Japanese creators but which Harmony Gold claimed as their own property inside the United States. The C&D from Harmony Gold did not have any effect on the viability of landing a publishing deal for a Mechwarrior project:

Contrary to all the press and speculation that Harmony Gold was getting in the way of a deal or development, this had no impact whatsoever on development or signing a deal for MechWarrior.

In June 2011, Bryan Ekman, from Piranha Games, tweeted that there was, in fact, no dispute with Harmony Gold, and that they were not responsible for the game's delay.

=== 2017: Harmony Gold sues PGI, Catalyst Game Labs, and Harebrained Schemes ===
Around 2013 and 2015, all the BattleTech and Mechwarrior properties had started re-introducing redesigned versions of the Unseen mechs, including the Warhammer, Marauder, and Rifleman. Catalyst Game Labs had started using the Warhammer, Marauder, and Rifleman as part of cover artwork for various products; PGI had introduced the Marauder, Warhammer, Archer, and Rifleman re-designed by Alex Iglesias in the fall of 2015; and Harebrained Schemes had reused those same mechs and their models from Mechwarrior: Online for their upcoming Battletech videogame as part of their Kickstarter and in the first alpha gameplay video.

On March 1, 2017, Harmony Gold filed lawsuit against Catalyst Game Labs, PGI and Harebrained Schemes over the use of not only the four redesigned Unseen mechs, but also the Locust, Atlas and Shadowhawk in the case of Harebrained Schemes' BattleTech videogame. Catalyst Game Labs defaulted on the lawsuit, while the case against Harebrained Schemes over the Atlas, Shadowhawk, and Locust was dismissed with prejudice on April 9, 2018. This still left the unseen mechs as part of the lawsuit that would still affect Catalyst Game Labs, PGI, and Harebrained Schemes. PGI did not back down and Harmony Gold eventually agreed to an undisclosed out-of-court settlement, dismissing the case with prejudice as a result. Following the lawsuit's conclusion, PGI, Catalyst Game Labs, and Harebrained Schemes have continued the use of the redesigned Unseen mechs. Harebrained Schemes would later re-introduce the redesigned Unseen mechs in the Heavy Metal expansion pack in 2019 and Catalyst Game Labs accompanied their public announcement about the case's dismissal with a large artwork of the redesigned Marauder by the artist Marco Mazzoni, while PGI would continue with selling the redesigned mechs in Mechwarrior: Online and feature them in MechWarrior 5: Mercenaries, later introducing a redesign of another of the Macross-derived Unseen mechs, the Crusader.

== Reception ==
Reception

Aggregate scores
Aggregator	Score
GameRankings	70.60%
Metacritic	68/100

Review scores
Publication	Score
GameSpot	6.0/10
GameTrailers	6.0/10
IGN	7.3/10
PC Gamer (UK)	83/100
GameFront	60/100

MechWarrior Online received mixed reviews from critics. Aggregating review websites GameRankings and Metacritic rated it as 70.60% and 68 respectively.

IGN gave the game a score of 7.3, stating that gameplay is solid and characterized it as an alternative to twitch-reflex based shooters in that MechWarrior Online rewards cautious play, thoughtful weapon use, and using advanced tactics. However, IGN criticized the games for being inconsistent in that matches swing between fast and furious and long and drawn out.

GameTrailers awarded a score of 6.0 out of 10, praising the ability for players to customize their BattleMechs, but criticizing the cumbersome user interface and that the game did a poor job at explaining its systems. GameTrailers also stated that though gameplay was generally enjoyable, it quickly became repetitive because only two game modes (Assault and Conquest) were available at the time of the review and that the game lacked a larger framework linking battles together.

GameSpot gave MechWarrior Online a score of 60 out of 100. GameSpot praised MechWarrior Online's graphics, gameplay, and customization, but criticized it for its high learning curve, lack of game modes, and lack of maps that supported 12v12 gameplay.

Delays of major features, design decisions, and lack of communication from the developers led to growing community backlash over the course of 2013.
