= MechWarrior (1989 video game) =

- Developer: Dynamix
- Publisher: Activision
- Producers: Steven Ackrich; John A. S. Skeel
- Designers: Paul Bowman; Terry Ishida; John A. S. Skeel; Damon Slye
- Programmers: Paul Bowman; Peter Fokos
- Writers: Paul Bowman; Mark Brenneman
- Composers: Michael Latham; Russell Lieblich; Bryce Morcello
- Series: MechWarrior
- Platforms: MS-DOS, X68000, PC-98
- Release: 1989: MS-DOS; July 10, 1992: X68000; March 12, 1993: PC-98
- Genre: Vehicle simulation
- Mode: Single-player

MechWarrior is the second video game released in the BattleTech game series. MechWarrior was the first video game to offer the player a chance to pilot a BattleMech from the view of a pilot (a MechWarrior). With this game the player has a great deal of freedom when compared to many of the follow-up MechWarrior games, which include choosing missions, buying & selling mechs and parts, hiring lance-mates, and traveling throughout the Inner Sphere. Underneath the major game mechanics, the player had the option of following a role playing style story arc that would unfold over five in-game years.

The game was ported to the Japanese X68000 and PC-98 home computers in 1992 and 1993 under the name Battletech: Ubawareta Seihai.

== Plot ==
The story is set from 3024 to 3028. It follows a mechwarrior by the name of Gideon Braver Vandenburg, the son of Duke Cameron Vandenburg. His family has been murdered and the chalice that proves he is heir to the throne of his planet, Ander's Moon, has been stolen. Without the chalice he is exiled. Gideon must develop a force of mechwarriors and battlemechs, find those who committed the acts against his family, and take his revenge within five years or all is lost.

The story ends with the defeat of the Dark Wing Mercenaries.

== Gameplay ==
Mechwarrior revolves around three basic elements of play. The player can travel around an accurate map of the Inner Sphere negotiating contracts with the five Great Houses. Depending on the player's actions, his mercenary unit will develop a reputation with each house which can bring about larger and more lucrative missions. A negative reputation can also be created if the player fights against a house in several missions. In this situation players will find that house is no longer willing to negotiate a contract.

The second element revolves around the battlemechs within the game. Battlemechs can be bought and sold or repaired from combat damage. In this way, the player can act as a merchant and acquire mechs on one planet and sell them on another planet to gain profit. Mechwarriors, too can be hired at the local bar with ranging levels of skill. As above, the unit's reputation will determine the quality of potential recruits.

Finally, there is the combat simulation. Depending on the contract for a mission, the player must meet certain criteria ranging from defense of a facility to outright destruction of the enemy. Combat is shown in first person from the cockpit of a battlemech. The game's engine uses simple vector based graphics for the actual combat.

The three elements combined to create a unique game that was part RPG, part economic, and part combat simulation.

=== Combat simulation ===
Fighting an enemy mech

1989's Mechwarrior was the first BattleTech simulator that placed the user within an actual battlemech to pilot in first person. While the flat-shaded 3D graphics were very simple, individual mechs were easy to identify. The player begins with a damaged Jenner and has the opportunity to build over time a full lance of 4 battlemechs with the ability to choose from a total of 8 designs. Each mech was well balanced and had its own unique role within the game. The Locust and Jenner were specially designed for quick strike style missions while the heaviest machines such as the Battlemaster and Marauder could walk through heavy fire and survive. Medium mechs such as the Phoenix Hawk and Shadow Hawk had the ability to leap over terrain with jump jets and harass enemies from behind (the Jenner also has this property). Finally the heavy class including both the Rifleman and Warhammer could bring the most firepower to bear. Every class had its own special role and was instrumental to the gameplay.

Combat itself followed the rules devised by the tabletop game. Rate of fire is limited by the mech's ability to dissipate heat through heat sinks. Overall combat was defined by 3025 era rules. Damage was carried over after each mission and required repairs to be completed at a cost to the owner. Early in the game, it is sometimes necessary to repair a mech only partially so that it can operate for a mission due to limited funds.

During combat the player can also give basic commands to lancemates which had very simple AI. One feature of this AI, rare in AI of this time, was its ability to retreat if a certain damage level was reached.

== Reception ==
Reception

Review scores
Publication	Score
Dragon	5/5
Computer Gaming World	4/5
ACE	887 out of 1000 points

MechWarrior was commercially successful, with sales of nearly 100,000 copies by 1997.

Jim Trunzo reviewed MechWarrior in White Wolf #21 (June/July 1990), rating it a 4 out of 5 and stated that "Mechwarrior, from Activision, is an exceptional product. It's seldom that the gamer is given such a rich, vicarious experience as he is in this game. Mechwarrior is a product that you'll play over and over again because each battle is uniquely challenging and the sophistication of the combat invites you to improve your skills and strategy each time you climb into the cockpit."

The game was reviewed in 1990 in Dragon #161 by Hartley, Patricia, and Kirk Lesser in "The Role of Computers" column. The reviewers gave the game 5 out of 5 stars. In a 1992 survey of science fiction games, Computer Gaming World gave the title four of five stars, stating that "this robotic combat simulation is like candy — fun and exuberant, although it may rot your teeth". A 1994 survey of strategic space games set in the year 2000 and later gave the game three stars out of five.

Rik Haynes of ACE scored MechWarrior 887 out of 1,000 points. He wrote: "Mechwarrior had me hooked right from the start, it's a near perfect fusion of flight- (tank!) simulation and role-playing game".

== See also ==
- MechWarrior, a video game for the Super Nintendo Entertainment System
