= Enad Global 7 =

Swedish video game holding company

Enad Global 7 AB
- Formerly: Toadman Interactive AB (2013–2020)
- Company type: Public
- Traded as: Nasdaq Stockholm: EG7
- ISIN: SE0010520106
- Industry: Video games
- Founded: 2013; 13 years ago
- Founders: Robin Flodin; Rasmus Davidsson
- Headquarters: Stockholm, Sweden
- Key people: Jason Epstein (chairman); Ji Ham (acting CEO); Fredrik Rüdén (deputy CEO, CFO)
- Revenue: ▼1.923 billion kr (2024)
- Operating income: ▼ -138.8 million kr (2024)
- Net income: ▼ -236.4 million kr (2024)
- Total assets: ▲4.915 billion kr (2024)
- Total equity: ▲3.974 billion kr (2024)
- Number of employees: 546 (2024)
- Subsidiaries: Petrol Advertising; Fireshine Games; Big Blue Bubble; Piranha Games; Daybreak Game Company
- Website: enadglobal7.com

Enad Global 7 AB (also known as EG7) is a Swedish video game holding company based in Stockholm. It was founded as Toadman Interactive in 2013 by Robin Flodin and Rasmus Davidsson as a work-for-hire consultancy studio. The company began fully developing games in 2017 and became a public company later that year. Starting in 2018, Toadman Interactive acquired other video game companies, including the developer Antimatter Games, marketing agency Petrol Advertising, and publisher Sold Out.

In January 2020, Toadman Interactive reformed as Enad Global 7, organising Petrol Advertising, Sold Out, and the renamed Toadman Studios as its direct subsidiaries. Since then, Enad Global 7 has acquired Big Blue Bubble, Piranha Games, Daybreak Game Company, and Innova. In August 2021, the management was replaced with Daybreak Game Company's Ji Ham as acting chief executive officer (CEO) and Fredrik Rüdén as deputy CEO and chief financial officer, with Flodin leaving the company and selling all shareholdings by May 2022. Innova was sold off in September 2022 due to the 2022 Russian invasion of Ukraine. Sold Out was rebranded as Fireshine Games in March 2022.

== History ==
=== Background ===
Enad Global 7 was founded as Toadman Interactive in 2013 by Robin Flodin and Rasmus Davidsson. Flodin grew up in Upplands Väsby and began developing video games at age 11, creating one with a friend each week to play with other friends on the weekends. After serving in the Swedish military, he began studying video game design in Gotland, at the University of Gotland. During his studies, Flodin created multiple games and founded a gaming startup at age 19. He and Teddy Sjöström conceptualised the game Dwarfs!? as part of a lecture in late 2009. For its development, they founded the studio Power of 2, of which Flodin was the chief executive officer (CEO). Tripwire Interactive, which Flodin had been acquainted with since 2008, published Dwarfs!? in May 2011. It became Flodin's "breakthrough game" and sold more than 250,000 copies by November 2017.

In March 2011, Flodin, Davidsson, and Ted Lindström founded Zeal Game Studio, of whom Flodin assumed the role of CEO. The studio was co-located with Power of 2 in a small office on Stenkumla väg in Visby. By May 2011, Zeal Game Studio had 12 employees, all of them active or former students of the University of Gotland. Due to the small office size, the company was looking to relocate within Visby. In November 2012, Zeal Game Studio employed 30 people in the Visby office (now on Tallundsgatan) and a second office in Stockholm (on Kungsholmen). The Visby office was still crowded, which Flodin blamed on limited housing available in Gotland. Also in November 2012, Flodin was named Gotland's "Young Entrepreneur of the Year".

Paradox Interactive, a Swedish video game publisher, invested in Zeal Game Studio as a result of the success of Dwarfs!?. Under Flodin's leadership, Zeal Game Studio developed two games for Paradox Interactive: Starvoid (2011) and A Game of Dwarves (2012). In December 2012, Flodin and former Starbreeze Studios executives Nicklas Dunham and Jens Larsson founded Gaming Corps in Uppsala, which absorbed Zeal Game Studio.

=== Early years as Toadman Interactive (2013–2017) ===
In 2013, Flodin and Davidsson decided to "restart" in Stockholm and established Toadman Interactive. The company acted as a consultancy firm for game development on a work-for-hire basis. Games that the company contributed to include Warhammer: End Times – Vermintide, Dead Island 2, and Bloodsports.TV. Toadman Interactive began developing its own games in 2017, starting with Immortal: Unchained. The studio initially intended to self-publish the game but later partnered with Game Odyssey for the personal computer version and Sold Out for the console versions.

In October 2017, Toadman Interactive announced its plans to become a public company, though Flodin and Davidsson were to retain a majority ownership. Around this time, the company had 25 employees and a second office in Berlin and had hired Alexander Albedj as chairman. By issuing new shares, the company expected to raise 22 million kr. Half of this was subscribed to by early investors, including Paradox Interactive founder Fredrik Malmberg and Simplygon founder Martin Ekdal, by November 2017. At the end of the subscription period later that month, 1,230 people had subscribed to the issuing for 83 million kr, wherefore a full share allocation could be undergone. Toadman Interactive planned to start trading on the NGM Nordic MTF on 6 December but missed that date. It was approved by the market the day after and commenced trading on 13 December. On its first day on the market, Toadman Interactive's share price fell by 25%, from 12.90 kr to 9.70 kr.

=== Expansion (2017–present) ===
In December 2017, Toadman Interactive formally registered a subsidiary for its Berlin office and hired Daniel Mesonero as the office's CEO and studio manager. In mid-2018, Toadman Interactive acquired the Norwegian studio Artplant. Craig Fletcher, the founder of Multiplay, infused a 3 million kr investment in August 2018. In September 2018, the company acquired Diskett Interactive Sweden, a game development consulting operation consisting of Andreas Jonsson and Jim Sagevid, for 140,000 kr. Jonsson later served as chief technical officer at Toadman Interactive. Immortal: Unchained was released later that month but failed to sell well, reaching a peak concurrent player count of just 235. In response, Toadman Interactive's share price fell by 39%. Later that month, the company hired Birgitta Lönnberg as its chief financial officer (CFO).

Toadman Interactive switched its trading venue from NGM Nordic MTF to Nasdaq First North in February 2019. In June, the company acquired the studio Antimatter Games and its 21 employees for roughly US$169,800. It also purchased the marketing agency Petrol Advertising for US$7.25 million in shares and US$10.75 million in cash that month. Toadman Interactive acquired the assets of Tangentix, including the GameSessions platform, for £50,000 in October 2019. The company bought Sold Out in November that year, paying £12 million in cash and £4 million in stock, as well as an additional £5.2 million if Sold Out reached certain financial targets by 2020.

In January 2020, Toadman Interactive announced the formation of Enad Global 7 as the parent company for Toadman Interactive (which was rebranded Toadman Studios), Sold Out, and Petrol. Artplant and Antimatter Games remained part of Toadman Studios. The move was aimed at clarifying the company's position as a holding company. "Enad" is a Swedish word meaning "unified" or "united". The reorganisation process was completed on 19 March 2020, when the entity Toadman Interactive AB was legally renamed Enad Global 7 AB and the company's ticker symbol changed to "EG7". In November that year, Enad Global 7 acquired two Canadian development studios: Big Blue Bubble for CA$16 million and Piranha Games for CA$31.4 million. In December 2020, Enad Global 7 purchased Daybreak Game Company for US$300 million. Enad Global 7 bought the Russian publisher Innova in February 2021. Sold Out rebranded as Fireshine Games in March 2022.

In August 2021, Flodin was replaced by Ji Ham (the CEO of Daybreak) as acting CEO. Flodin was to stay with the company for six months. Fredrik Rüdén was appointed as deputy CEO and CFO, with Lönnberg now reporting to him. Flodin's last shareholdings were bought out by the company's executives in May 2022. This made Jason Epstein, Daybreak Game Company's former owner, the second-largest shareholder in Enad Global 7. He was named chairman of the company by August. As a result of the 2022 Russian invasion of Ukraine, Enad Global 7 announced its intent to divest of Innova via a management buyout valued at €32 million and plans to relocate key staff from Artplant's Russian office outside of the country. In September 2022, it announced that it sold Innova to Games Mobile ST for €21 million.

In January 2025, Enad Global 7 shut down Toadman Studios (which had since returned to the Toadman Interactive name) alongside redundancies at Piranha Games.
