= Piranha Games =

Canadian video game developer

Piranha Games Inc.
- Company type: Subsidiary
- Industry: Video games
- Founded: January 22, 2000; 26 years ago
- Founders: Bryan Ekman Russ Bullock; Jason Holtslander
- Headquarters: Burnaby, Canada
- Number of employees: 56 (2024)
- Parent: Enad Global 7 (2020–present)
- Website: piranhagames.com

Piranha Games Inc. is a Canadian video game developer based in Burnaby, British Columbia. The company was founded by Russ Bullock, President and Executive Producer, and Bryan Ekman, VP and Creative Director. Piranha Games is one of the oldest game developers in the Greater Vancouver area and was housed in the International Village Mall in the Chinatown area until their relocation to their current Burnaby headquarters. On November 25, 2020, Piranha Games entered into an agreement to be acquired by Enad Global 7.

== History ==
In the Autumn of 1999, three entrepreneurs – Bullock, Ekman, and Jason Holtslander – set out to create a Half-Life mod called Die Hard: Nakatomi Plaza (DH:NP). After working together for a few months, the team received a letter from Fox Interactive requiring all work on the mod cease and desist. The three used this event as a catalyst to pursue their dreams of starting a new development studio and turning Die Hard: Nakatomi Plaza into a full product for the PC platform.

Piranha Games Inc. was officially founded in early 2000 by Bullock, Ekman, and Holtslander, with an initial infusion of private funding. After an 8-month period of creating demos for Fox Interactive, a deal was struck in August 2000, and Die Hard: Nakatomi Plaza was officially under production.

On November 25, 2020, Swedish company Enad Global 7 acquired Piranha Games for $31.4M CAD, the acquisition was finished on March 1, 2021.

=== Early years ===
Work began in earnest on DH:NP mid August 2000. The team doubled in size from six developers to twelve and moved into its new office location in Downtown Vancouver. Production on DH:NP moved along steadily through the winter and into 2001 in preparation for E3 2001. After a modest E3 showing, DH:NP continued development, targeting a fall release date. Crunching hard for the next 6 months, with the team exhausted and the ownership at odds with each other, the game's ship date slipped into spring 2002. During the summer and fall of 2001, Jason Holtslander was bought out by the remaining principals.

With the departure of Holtslander, Piranha refocused its energy towards finishing DH:NP and expanding the business into the casual space through the creation of a new label and company called Jarhead Games. In the spring of 2002 DH:NP was released.

In the summer of 2005 Piranha Games began working on an unannounced next generation title which was later revealed to be a new Mechwarrior game. In the spring of 2007, Piranha Games was contracted to work on EA Playground for the Nintendo DS and Medal of Honor: Heroes 2 for the PSP. Piranha Games has also worked with Gearbox Software to develop the PS3 and Xbox 360 versions of Duke Nukem Forever, along with the multiplayer component.

In 2011, after failing to work with former rights holders Smith & Tinker to fund a new MechWarrior game, Piranha Games bought the rights to the series from them.

After a lengthy period without news regarding the new MechWarrior game, Piranha announced that the game, after some 'false starts', had become MechWarrior Online, and had been transformed into a mech-based MMO. MechWarrior Online ended Closed Beta phase in 2012, and officially launched following an Open Beta in fall of 2013 to mediocre reviews from critics, and poor reception with fans of the franchise.

=== Current ===
PGI continues live iterative development of Mechwarrior Online. On December 5, 2016, Piranha announced their development of MechWarrior 5: Mercenaries, a single-purchase single player campaign title for the franchise using the Unreal 4 engine, with a playable demo due to be rolled out at the company's annual Vancouver Mech-Con event in December 2017 and full release rescheduled for September 2019 (Originally December 2018).

On July 25, 2019, it was announced that MechWarrior 5: Mercenaries would be delayed again with a launch date of December 10, 2019. The game would also be an Epic Games Store exclusive for 1 year, although it was also released for Xbox Game Pass.

== Games developed ==
Year	Title	Platforms	Publisher	Notes
2002	Die Hard: Nakatomi Plaza	Windows	Sierra Entertainment/Vivendi Universal Games	
2007	Medal of Honor: Heroes 2	PSP	Electronic Arts	PSP version only
2008	Need for Speed: Undercover	PSP	Electronic Arts	PSP version only
2009	Bass Pro Shops: The Strike	Windows, Xbox 360, Wii	XS Games/Psyclone	
2010	Bass Pro Shops: The Hunt	Windows, Xbox 360, Wii	XS Games	
2011	Duke Nukem Forever	Windows, PS3, Xbox 360, macOS	2K Games	Additional development
2011	Days of Thunder	PS3, Xbox 360	Paramount Digital Entertainment/505 Games	
2013	MechWarrior Online	Windows	Piranha Games/Infinite Game Publishing	
2019	MechWarrior 5: Mercenaries	Windows, PS4, PS5, Xbox One, Xbox Series X/S	Piranha Games	
2024	MechWarrior 5: Clans	Windows, PS5, Xbox Series X/S	Piranha Games	

=== Jarhead Games ===
- Elite Forces: Navy SEALs (Windows)
- CTU: Marine Sharpshooter (Windows)
- Elite Forces: Navy SEALs – Weapons of Mass Destruction (Windows)
- Western Outlaw: Wanted Dead or Alive (Windows)
- Marine Sharpshooter II: Jungle Warfare (Windows)
- World War II: Sniper – Call to Victory (Windows)
- Army Ranger: Mogadishu (Windows)
- Outlaw Chopper (Windows)
- DMZ: North Korea (Windows)
- NRA Gun Club (PlayStation 2)
- Bass Pro Shops: Trophy Hunter 2007 (Windows, Xbox)
- Marine Sharpshooter 3 (Windows)
