= MechWarrior 4: Mercenaries =

2002 video game

Mechwarrior 4: Mercenaries
- Developers: Cyberlore FASA Studio; Studio MekTek
- Publishers: Microsoft Game Studios; Studio MekTek
- Producer: Jon Clark
- Designer: David Fifield
- Programmer: Chris Tohline
- Artists: Seth Spaulding; Heinz Schuller
- Composers: Heinz Schuller; Mark Duncan
- Series: MechWarrior
- Platform: Microsoft Windows
- Release: NA: November 8, 2002; EU: November 15, 2002
- Genre: Vehicle simulation
- Modes: Single-player, multiplayer

MechWarrior 4: Mercenaries is a vehicle simulation video game for Microsoft Windows, released in 2002. It is a standalone expansion of MechWarrior 4: Vengeance, based on the BattleTech/MechWarrior game universe. The game was developed by Cyberlore in tandem with FASA Studio. This studio would also be responsible for MechWarrior 4's previous expansion, Black Knight - as well as both the InnerSphere and Clan Mech Packs.

Mechwarrior 4: Mercenaries and Clan and Inner Sphere expansions were re-released for free. By April 22, 2010 Microsoft had cleared its free release and on April 30, MechWarrior 4: Mercenaries was released to the general public by MekTek as a free download. However, due to the massive influx of 100,000 downloads and web site accesses, MekTek.net and related services crashed. MekTek recovered the MekMatch match making service on May 1 and the forum was restored the next day.

In the following years, MechWarrior 4: Mercenaries was no longer available free. MekTek expressed their intent to move away from the BattleTech franchise, and a new group interested in maintaining free versions appeared but encountered difficulties securing permission to continue offering the game as a free download.

== Plot ==
In the game, the player takes the role of Spectre, a mercenary BattleMech pilot travelling inside the fictional interstellar region of the BattleTech universe called the Inner Sphere during the FedCom Civil War (specifically during the time period from January 1, 3066 to late July 3067).

The player's mercenary company initially takes on localized threats in certain planets far from the civil war. As the player's team takes on more missions, the assignments get tougher; at one point, Spectre may challenge a Jade Falcon group led by Aisa Thastus, The Star Colonel, to a duel. Aisa Thastus will join the player's team as a bondsman if the Falcons are defeated in this mission. It is a beach-side battle that pits eight of Spectre's best against ten of hers. That mission can be substituted for a mission to attack the Falcons in a sneak attack where the battle is just as difficult. This direction leads to the death of Aisa instead of her joining the team.

Depending on how the player handled allegiance between House Steiner and House Davion, they would end up with one of two mission paths, with three different endings.

Davion Ending: Spectre and three lancemates must run a gauntlet of multiple mechs, turrets and aircraft before a final battle with Nondi Steiner. The final battle consists of a courtyard containing three Longbow, and three Awesome fighting Peter's Victor-mech forces. Spectre must aid Peter in defeating these mechs (up to six depending on how fast Spectre's lance arrives and how well Peter does) before fighting Nondi. She rides a low-key Hauptmann and has four potent Daishi bodyguards. Instead of fashioning his position as leader, Spectre becomes Peter's personal guard for years to come.

#1 Steiner Ending: The first option is on the planet Carse, where Spectre has the opportunity to fight Clan Wolf for a Trial of Position. The Trial is a 1-on-5 (one at a time) with the best warriors Wolf's Clan offers - Vulture, Thor, Mad Cat, Masakari, and Daishi. In winning, the Spectre will present the Khan with the location of Steiner and become part of Clan Wolf - where he would grow to be an elite Trial fighter.

#2 Steiner Ending: This is the second option and is available at the same time as the Trial of possession. Steiner is in exile and Spectre can gain control of a full base worth millions of credits. As the two missions become available, Spectre's tactical officer, Castle, pleads the case for abandoning Katrina Steiner and the losing side of the war. Instead of undergoing the Trial of Position, Spectre elects to take a contract on New Canton to defend a base under attack by the Capellan Confederation. After repelling some 25 mechs and General Woo Kang Kwo, Spectre's unit takes the base for themselves.

== Gameplay ==
The player is a pilot of a BattleMech or 'Mech, the iconic war machines in the BattleTech universe. Mercenaries has the player piloting a 'Mech and running a mercenary company at the same time. The company is sponsored by one of four mercenary outfits in the BattleTech universe—the Kell Hounds, Gray Death Legion, Northwind Highlanders, and Wolf's Dragoons. Each faction has their own special attributes, such as the Wolf's Dragoons being equipped with 'Mechs that have Clan technology.

In the campaign, the player controls up to two full four-man squads called lances. The other squad members can be issued commands such as attack or power down. The larger squad sizes allowed for larger battles, a unique addition to this iteration of the classic videogame franchise.

Missions are played in various environments, from deserts to urban areas. Completing them plus special objectives helps the player earn more money to buy weapons and 'Mechs for his unit. The resource management extends to maintaining the 'Mechs and hiring new pilots with the requisite salaries. The game time will be measured in weeks.

The player has some control over which missions to accept and in what order. In addition, how each mission is performed affects the timeline, and the player's reputation is measured in terms of Nobility or Infamy points. For example, killing civilians and neutral targets results in infamy points, which in high numbers can limit the player to brutal and "unethical" missions. Also, the player must choose between loyalty to House Steiner or House Davion. This is important as allegiance will eventually affect available contracts and even influence the ending of the game.

The game offers options to toggle unlimited ammunition and no heat buildup. In the 'Mech customization menu, the mercenary company's available Mechs can be upgraded with new weapons or equipment such as antimissile systems, extra armor, heatsinks, or ECM jammer pods. The configurations of each 'Mech can limit what weapons can be equipped, with penalties on weight by the ton and heat levels. Since 'Mechs tend to overheat (mostly from using large and powerful weapons while equipped with too few heat sinks, or by being hit with a few specialized heat-inducing weapons), the player has to equip a combination of high-heat energy weapons and low-heat-but-high-weight ballistic and missile weapons, which use up ammo, unlike energy weapons. It is possible for entire limbs to be blown off a 'Mech, resulting in loss of weapons or reduced movement. Destruction of the center torso or cockpit of a 'Mech, or of both legs, will result in the instant destruction of that 'Mech.

The Arena matches, which take place in the gaming planet of Solaris, has the player-character competing with a variety of enemy 'Mech pilots in "last-man standing" combat. If all other enemy 'Mechs are destroyed, the player wins the match and is rewarded money. Many of the opposing pilots have names and backstories, which are revealed by the arena announcer who provides constant real-time commentary on the matches. Arena battles are divided into four weight classes and take place in several different arenas. After winning all of the matches in each weight class, the player advances to the championship round, which is open to all weight classes. Competing in them can boost the player's reputation.

== Reception ==
Reception

Aggregate score
Aggregator	Score
Metacritic	83/100

Review scores
Publication	Score
Computer Gaming World	4.5/5
Game Informer	9.5/10
GameSpot	7.8/10
GameSpy	3.5/5
GameZone	9/10
IGN	9.1/10
PC Gamer (UK)	83%
PC Gamer (US)	85%
PC Zone	82%
X-Play	3/5

Mercenaries received "favorable" reviews according to the review aggregation website Metacritic. GameSpot nominated the game for its annual "Best Sci-Fi Simulation Game on PC" award, which went to Star Trek: Bridge Commander. During the 6th Annual Interactive Achievement Awards, Mercenaries received a nomination for "Computer Simulation Game of the Year" by the Academy of Interactive Arts & Sciences.
