= Pyr (publisher) =

American specialty publishing imprint

- Parent company: Start Publishing
- Founded: 2005
- Country of origin: United States
- Headquarters location: Amherst, New York
- Distribution: Simon and Schuster
- Fiction genres: science fiction and fantasy
- Official website: www.pyrsf.com

Pyr was the science fiction and fantasy imprint of Prometheus Books, launched in March 2005 with the publication of John Meaney's Paradox. In November 2018 it was sold to Start Publishing.

Prometheus Books' name was derived from Prometheus, the Titan from Greek mythology who gave fire to humans. The name Pyr, the Greek word for fire, was chosen to continue this connection to fire and the liveliness of imagination.

Lou Anders served as Pyr's editorial director from its inception until 2014.

== Authors published ==
- Joe Abercrombie
- Fiona Avery
- Michael Blumlein
- Keith Brooke
- Storm Constantine
- Jack Dann
- Gardner Dozois
- David Louis Edelman
- K.D. Edwards
- Charles Coleman Finlay
- Alan Dean Foster
- Mark Hodder
- K. V. Johansen
- Kay Kenyon
- Alexis Glynn Latner
- Scott Mackay
- Ian McDonald
- John Meaney
- Michael Moorcock
- Mike Resnick
- Chris Roberson
- Adam Roberts
- Justina Robson
- Joel Shepherd
- Robert Silverberg
- Martin Sketchley
- Adrian Tchaikovsky
- David Walton
- Sean Williams
- George Zebrowski

== Awards and nominations ==
- 2011 John W. Campbell Memorial Award for Best Science Fiction Novel winner: Ian McDonald The Dervish House
- 2011 Hugo Award for Best Novel nominee: Ian McDonald The Dervish House
- 2011 Arthur C. Clarke Award nominee: Ian McDonald The Dervish House
- 2011 Locus Award for Best Science Fiction Novel nominee: Ian McDonald The Dervish House
- 2010 Philip K. Dick Award: Mark Hodder The Strange Affair of Spring Heeled Jack
- 2010 British Science Fiction Award for Best Novel winner: Ian McDonald The Dervish House
- 2010 British Science Fiction Award for Best Novel nominee: Ken MacLeod The Restoration Game
- 2010 John W. Campbell Memorial Award for Best Science Fiction Novel nominee: Paul J. McAuley Gardens of the Sun
- 2010 World Fantasy Award for Best Novel nominee: James Enge Blood of Ambrose
- 2009 Chesley Award for Best Art Director: Lou Anders
- 2009 Philip K. Dick Award nominee: Ian McDonald Cyberabad Days
- 2009 Arthur C. Clarke Award nominee: Paul J. McAuley The Quiet War
- 2008 Hugo Award for Best Novel nominee: Ian McDonald Brasyl
- 2008 Nebula Award for Best Novel nominee: Ian McDonald Brasyl
- 2008 John W. Campbell Memorial Award for Best Science Fiction Novel nominee: Ian McDonald Brasyl
- 2008 Locus Award for Best Science Fiction Novel nominee: Ian McDonald Brasyl
- 2008 Hugo Award for Best Editor Long Form, nominee: Lou Anders
- 2008 John W. Campbell Award for Best New Writer nominee: Joe Abercrombie
- 2008 John W. Campbell Award for Best New Writer nominee: David Louis Edelman
- 2008 Philip K. Dick Award nominee: Lou Anders Fast Forward 2
- 2007 British Science Fiction Award for Best Novel winner: Ian McDonald Brasyl
- 2007 Philip K. Dick Award nominee: Adam Roberts Gradisil
- 2007 Arthur C. Clarke Award nominee: Adam Roberts Gradisil
- 2007 Quill Award nominee: Ian McDonald, Brasyl
- 2007 Hugo Award for Best Editor Long Form nominee: Lou Anders
- 2007 Chesley Award for Best Art Director nominee: Lou Anders
- 2006 World Fantasy Award - Special Award, Professional nominee: Lou Anders
- 2006 John W. Campbell Memorial Award for Best Novel nominee: David Louis Edelman, Infoquake
- 2006 Independent Publisher Book Award winner: John Meaney, Paradox
- 2005 Philip K Dick Award nominee: Justina Robson, Silver Screen
- 2006 John W. Campbell Award for Best New Writer nominee: Chris Roberson
- 2005 John W. Campbell Award for Best New Writer nominee: Chris Roberson
- 2005 World Fantasy Award - Best Artist, for Pyr covers nominee: Jeremy Caniglia

== Further recommendations and endorsements ==
- Kay Kenyon, Bright of the Sky - selected as one of PW's Best Books of the Year for 2007.
- Ian McDonald, Brasyl - selected as the number two title in Amazon's Best Books of 2007 - Top 10 Editors' Picks: Science Fiction & Fantasy for 2007.
- Ian McDonald, Brasyl - selected as one of Amazon's Best of the Year, So Far: Hidden Gems for 2007.
- Locus magazine Recommended Reading: 2006 : Joe Abercrombie - The Blade Itself, Justina Robson - Keeping It Real
- Pyr Books included in the B&N Editor's Choice: Top Ten SF&F Novels of 2006: David Louis Edelman - Infoquake (#1), Sean Williams - The Crooked Letter, John Meaney - Resolution
- 2 Pyr Books included in Waterstone's Top Ten SF for 2006: Joel Shepherd - Crossover, Chris Roberson - Paragaea: A Planetary Romance
- 3 Pyr Books included in Bookgasm's Top Five SciFi Books of 2006 - Ian McDonald - River of Gods (#1), Joel Shepherd - Crossover, David Louis Edelman - Infoquake
- Sean Williams, The Hanging Mountains selected as a BookSense Notable Book for July
- Kay Kenyon, Bright of the Sky - one of four novels selected by ReaderCon "the con that assigns homework" for their attendees to read pre-convention
- Justina Robson, Silver Screen selected for Kirkus Reviews Best SF&F Books of 2005
- John Meaney, Paradox - #2 on Barnes & Noble's Editor's Choice: Top Ten SF&F Novels of 2005
