= Denny Thorley =

American video game designer

- Occupation: Video game designer

Denny Thorley is an American video game designer.

== Career ==
Denny Thorley and Jordan Weisman formed the new company FASA Interactive in 1995, at which point the role-playing game company FASA Corporation gave a license to FASA Interactive for its properties in exchange for stock.

Thorley was also president of Day 1 Studios. MechAssault was initiated when Thorley approached Jon Kimmich of Microsoft about developing an original BattleTech game built from the ground up to support console play.
