= 2000 in science fiction =

The year 2000 was marked, in science fiction, by the following:

== Events ==
- The 58th annual Worldcon, Chicon 2000, is held in Chicago, USA

== Births and deaths ==
=== Deaths ===
- L. Sprague de Camp
- Jimmy Guieu
- Curt Siodmak
- A. E. Van Vogt

== Literary releases ==
=== Novels ===
- Revelation Space, by Alastair Reynolds
- Salt, by Adam Roberts

== Movies ==
- The Cell, dir. by Tarsem Singh
- Cóndor Crux, dir, by Juan Pablo Buscarini, Swan Glecer, and Pablo Holcer
- Pitch Black, dir. by David Twohy
- Titan A.E., dir. by Don Bluth and Gary Goldman
- X-Men, dir. by Bryan Singer

== Video games ==
- Crimson Skies
- Deus Ex
- Perfect Dark

== Other media ==
- 2000x
- Deltron 3030

== Awards ==
=== Hugos ===
- Best novel: A Deepness in the Sky, by Vernor Vinge
- Best novella: The Winds of Mable Arch, by Connie Willis
- Best novelette: "10^{16} to 1" by James Patrick Kelly
- Best short story: "Scherzo with Tyrannosaur" by Michael Swanwick
- Best related work: Science Fiction of the 20th Century, by Frank M. Robinson
- Best dramatic presentation: Galaxy Quest, dir. by Dean Parisot; screenplay by David Howard and Robert Gordon; Story by David Howard
- Best professional editor: Gardner Dozois
- Best professional artist: Michael Whelan
- Best Semiprozine: Locus, ed. by Charles N. Brown
- Best fanzine: File 770, ed. by Mike Glyer
- Best fan writer: Dave Langford
- Best fan artist: Joe Mayhew

=== Nebulas ===
- Best novel: Darwin's Radio, by Greg Bear
- Best novella: Goddesses, by Linda Nagata
- Best novelette: "Daddy's World", by Walter Jon Williams
- Best short story: "macs", by Terry Bisson
- Best script: Galaxy Quest, screenplay by David Howard and Robert Gordon

=== Other awards ===
- BSFA Award for Best Novel: Ash: A Secret History, by Mary Gentle
- Locus Award for Best Science Fiction Novel: Cryptonomicon, by Neal Stephenson
- Saturn Award for Best Science Fiction Film: X-Men
