= Jon Kimmich =

American video game developer

Jon Kimmich (aka "jonki") is an American video game developer. He was a Lead Product Planner for Microsoft Games Studios during pivotal parts of the Xbox conception, launch and lifespan. Kimmich was instrumental in the acquisition of many titles for Microsoft Games Studios publishing for both the PC and Xbox platforms. Together with Ed Fries and Stuart Moulder, Kimmich was responsible for the acquisition of Bungie, FASA Interactive, and Digital Anvil. In addition to acquisitions, Kimmich secured publishing rights for Microsoft for externally developed games such as Dungeon Siege by Gas Powered Games, Rise of Nations from Big Huge Games, and MechAssault by Day 1 Studios as well as many internally developed games such as Crimson Skies, MechWarrior 4: Vengeance, Brute Force and Halo.

According to The Xbox 360 Uncloaked by Dean Takahashi, Kimmich also negotiated deals for Epic's Gears of War and a new Valve game for the Xbox 360, of which only Gears of War was signed by MGS.

Before joining Microsoft Games Studios, Kimmich held other positions at Microsoft, which included development manager for a new product development group in Microsoft's Hardware Team, responsible for hardware devices such as the original award-winning Microsoft Natural keyboard. The addition of the Windows-key and application-key, which first appeared on the Microsoft Natural Keyboard in 1994 (and are now standard on most keyboards and laptops designed to support Windows) has been attributed to Kimmich.

In June 2004, Kimmich left Microsoft to become Producer and Director of Business Development for Day 1 Studios. Since this time, Day 1 Studios has developed MechAssault 2, F.E.A.R. for the Xbox 360 and PlayStation 3, and Fracture.

In 2012, he was a contributor to and editor for The Crowdfunding Bible, along with Rusel DeMaria and Scott Steinberg. The Crowdfunding Bible examines how successful funding campaigns can be developed for a variety of consumer product categories including games, gadgets, films and books on sites such as Kickstarter, IndieGoGo and RocketHub. It includes interviews with the creators of the TikTok LunaTik Watch, The Pebble E-Paper Watch, Shadowrun Returns, Wasteland 2, Designing Obama and others.

Kimmich was also an investor in WizKids, LLC, a game company founded by Jordan Weisman (founder of FASA Interactive) in 2000 to develop and sell a line of collectible miniatures. He has also been an advisor to such companies as FaceIt, Harebrained Schemes, Alpha Dog Games and others.
