= Crimson Skies: High Road to Revenge =

2003 video game

- Developer: FASA Studio
- Publisher: Microsoft Game Studios
- Directors: Jim Deal; Jim Napier
- Producer: Sean Gilmour
- Designer: Bill Morrison
- Artist: Robert Olson
- Writer: Jeffrey Howell
- Composer: Stan LePard
- Series: Crimson Skies
- Platform: Xbox
- Release: NA: October 21, 2003; EU: October 31, 2003
- Genres: Action, Arcade flight
- Modes: Single-player, multiplayer

Crimson Skies: High Road to Revenge is a first-party video game developed by FASA Studio (part of Microsoft Game Studios) for the Xbox. The game, like the earlier Crimson Skies for the PC, is an action-oriented arcade flight game. Nonetheless, there are significant differences between the gameplay of High Road to Revenge and that of the original PC title. For example, while the Xbox game has a more open-ended mission structure, it offers less plane customization than the PC game.

Set in an alternate 1930s in which the plane and Zeppelin become the primary means of transportation, the game focuses on the adventures of Nathan Zachary, leader of the Fortune Hunters air pirate gang. Players assume his role as he undertakes a crusade to avenge the death of his old friend, "Doc" Fassenbiender.

The game was originally announced in March 2002 for a release that fall. The developers postponed the release date to give them time to retool the game. As a result of this overhaul, which delayed the game's publication to October 2003, several issues were addressed and new features added, most notably the addition of Xbox Live support. A Microsoft Windows port was planned but was cancelled. Critically the game was very well-received, most notably for its graphics, audio, gameplay, and Xbox Live features.

== Gameplay ==
The player, in an upgraded Devastator aircraft, fires at a target gun truck. From left to right on the game's HUD are health, ammo, and special meters, cash on hand, and a radar display.

High Road to Revenge is a flight-based combat game: during most of the game, the player controls an aircraft from a third-person perspective. It is an arcade flight game as opposed to a flight simulator; physics are relaxed, controls are simplified, and takeoffs and landings are completely automated. Project lead Jim Deal explained that Crimson Skies was built around an arcade design to make the game easy to learn, and to place its focus on action instead of the physics of flight.

There are over twelve playable fighter aircraft in Crimson Skies: High Road to Revenge, including planes available to download over Xbox Live. Each aircraft has its own ratings for speed, maneuverability, armor, and a distinct weapons layout. Machine guns and cannons, which serve as primary weapons, have unlimited ammunition, but can temporarily overheat. Fighters are also equipped with limited-ammunition secondary weapons, examples of which include magnetic rockets, heavy cannons, and a Tesla coil.

In keeping with the game's arcade nature, the armor and secondary ammunition of the player's aircraft can be replenished by flying into health and ammunition crates, which are dropped by destroyed enemies and scattered throughout the terrain. Developers also added special maneuvers, such as the barrel roll and the Immelmann, which the player can perform during flight through manipulation of the analog sticks. Use of these stunts is governed by a "special meter" which recharges over time during play.

High Road to Revenge gives the player the ability to switch out of their current plane during gameplay and commandeer additional aircraft on the ground. The player also has the ability to take control of fixed weapon emplacements, at which time the camera shifts to a first-person view. Turret types include machine guns, flak cannons and rocket launchers. They are found in most of the game's maps, built into the terrain or mounted on vehicles such as Zeppelins.

=== Single player campaign ===
The game's single-player mode has four difficulty settings and spans twenty levels. The player has access to ten aircraft during the campaign; the player starts with one available, and can acquire others by stealing them during some stages of the campaign. Most playable craft can be upgraded once—each using money and upgrade tokens found or awarded during missions. High Road to Revenge, however, lacks the aircraft customization features present in the Crimson Skies game for the PC. Designer Jose Perez III later lamented the game's upgrade system, opining in favor of the one present in the PC game.

Several levels in the game are structured similarly to the open-world missions of the Grand Theft Auto series. On these stages, missions are represented by icons located throughout the game map. The player triggers a mission by flying to one of these icons; the events of the mission then unfold on the same environment. A predetermined set of story missions advances the game's plot during these levels. In addition to pursuing story-based missions, the player may explore the area, steal additional aircraft, complete optional missions, plunder neutral airships, or participate in air races. These actions may earn the player money, which is necessary to use repair stations or to upgrade a player's aircraft.

=== Multiplayer and Xbox Live ===
Multiplayer in Crimson Skies: High Road to Revenge is available through split-screen on one console for up to four players. Multiplayer for up to sixteen players is also available via System Link and Xbox Live. In the latter mode, two players may play on one Xbox Live account via split-screen.

The following multiplayer modes are available for the game out of the box:

- Dogfight: a deathmatch mode, in which players earn points for shooting down enemies.
- Flag Heist: a capture the flag (CTF) mode in which the objective is to seize a flag from an enemy team's base and return it to one's own.
- Keep Away: a mode in which the goal is to capture and hold an artifact (in-game item) for a set amount of time.
- Wild Chicken: a deathmatch/CTF variant in which points are earned either for killing enemies or for returning a "wild chicken" (in-game item) to a team's base.

A player's online ranking in High Road to Revenge is based on their performance record, which includes wins and losses as per the Crimson Skies' Xbox Live scoring system. This system incentivizes players to earn higher points by defeating higher-ranked opponents or by achieving victories against stronger teams. The scoring system also credits players who play matches to completion, intended to punish players who "drop" out of an online match they are losing.

In addition, Microsoft released free downloadable content for the game during 2003 and 2004 via Xbox Live. This additional content has included new planes, multiplayer game maps, voice chat, and the following two multiplayer game modes:

- Chicken Pox: a variant of Dogfight and Wild Chicken in which chickens are used as power-ups.
- Gunheist: a mode in the objective is for players to seize and maintain control of the territory's AA guns.

While online support for original Xbox games ended in 2010, Crimson Skies is now playable online with Insignia, a revival server restoring online functionality to original Xbox games.

== Plot ==
=== Setting ===
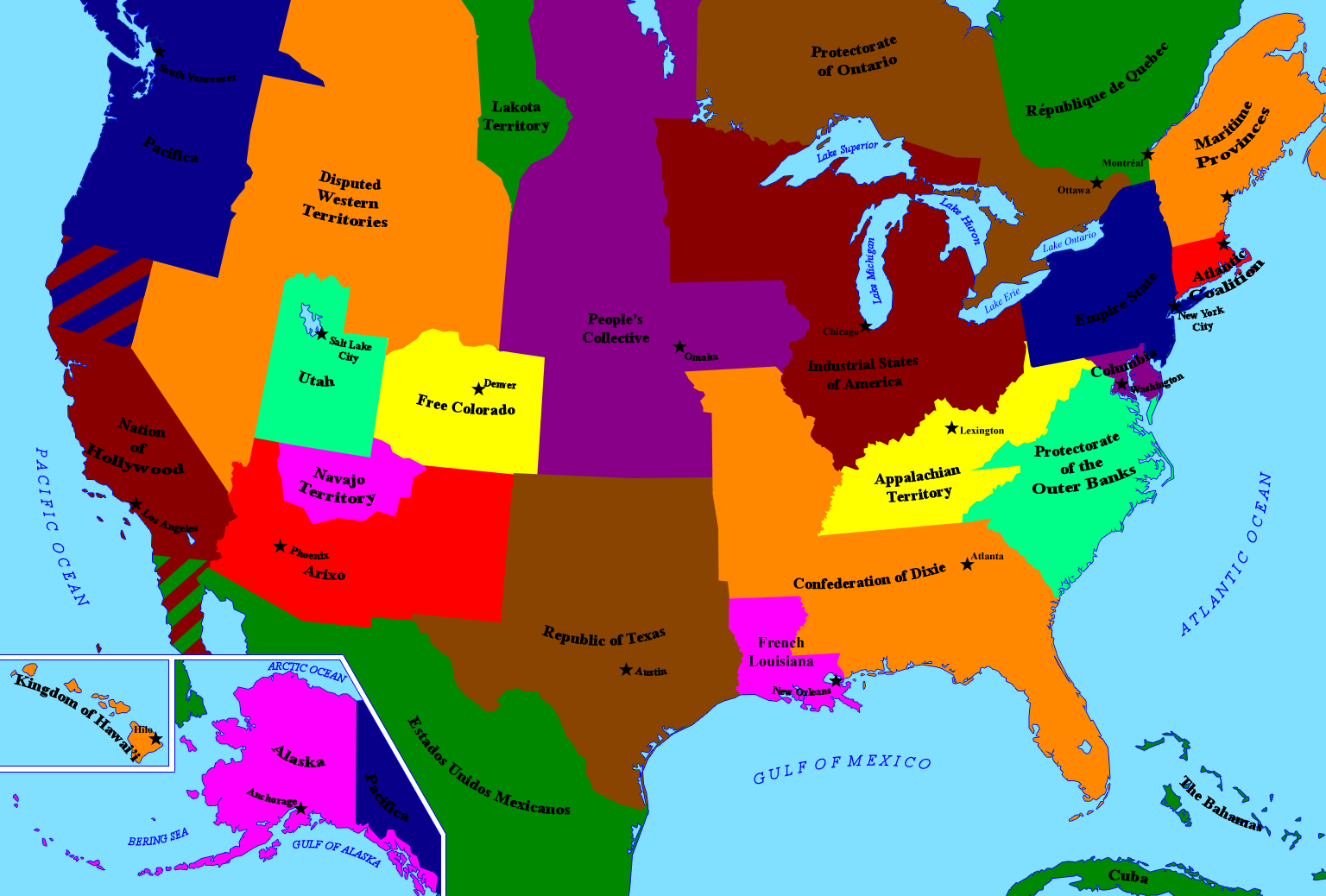
North America in the Crimson Skies universe

The game takes place in the Crimson Skies universe, set in an alternate history of the 1930s. In this fictional setting, increasing sectionalism within the United States of America has caused the country to splinter into numerous sovereignties, whereas in the southern sovereignty, slavery had been reinstituted, and was a major driver of conflict between the established nation-states resulting in a constant state of war with one another, and thus an interstate highway system never developed. This in turn caused the primary means of transportation to shift from the car and train to the plane and Zeppelin; consequently came the formation of air pirate gangs who plunder aerial commerce over North America.

As a result of the events surrounding the world of Crimson Skies, advancements in technology within the game universe proceeded at a faster rate than actually occurred in the same era. Certain designs and technologies were created specifically for the game, some beyond the scope of actual 1930s technology, examples of which include remote-controlled rocket launchers, magnetic rockets, weather control devices, and a Tesla coil-like weapon. The game's aircraft were designed to be true to the era yet unique, with some models inspired from actual period aircraft or from the experimental designs of the Luftwaffe. Art director Robert Olson has stated that his team faced challenges in developing content that "fit the time setting" and was also "both fantastical and believable", particularly in the design of the game's bosses.

The game takes place in four regions set in North and South America. Sea Haven is an island in the Nation of Hollywood; it is a refuge for various pirate groups, but the Hollywood militia attempts to uproot the raiders. Arixo is a desert nation-state, formed from the remnants of Arizona and New Mexico. Due to its vast, desolate, and lawless expanses, Arixo has become a haven for bandit activity. The Navajo Nation is an isolationist and militant haven for the Navajo Native American tribes that encompasses territory from the former states of Arizona, New Mexico, Utah, and Colorado. Chicago remains an industrial city, while the "Lost City" is a complex of ancient ruins located deep in South America. In designing many of these environments, developers used inspiration from real-world locales, but reworked them to incorporate flight spaces accordingly with the Crimson Skies universe. For example, Chicago was significantly redesigned for High Road to Revenge with the addition of avenues for aerial commerce among its skyscrapers and landing areas within the buildings themselves.

=== Characters ===
The player character is Nathan Zachary (voiced by Tim Omundson), leader of the Fortune Hunters air pirate gang. The character of Nathan Zachary was redesigned from his previous role in the PC game Crimson Skies, redefined by the darker tone of High Road to Revenge in comparison to the "campy" and "pulpy" tone established in the PC game. Zachary's character was also modified to have a number of flaws and weaknesses in addition to his strengths. He is described as having a dry sense of humor, and is also portrayed as a somewhat reckless character. Overall, developers wanted to maintain that Zachary was not "born a hero" and instead was forced to become one as a result of extraordinary circumstances.

Other members of the Fortune Hunters include Zachary's wingmate, "Brooklyn" Betty Charles; and "Big John", who captains the Fortune Hunters' Zeppelin base, Pandora. Later joining them is the adventurer Maria Sanchez, who owns a fuel station in Arixo. Another ally of the Fortune Hunters is "Doc" Fassenbiender, a scientist who has developed new technologies for the pirate group and is a close friend of Nathan Zachary.

Opposing the Fortune Hunters include rival pirate gangs such as the Ragin' Cajuns, led by Louis "Wild Card" Thibodeaux; and the Red Skull Legion, led by Jonathan "Genghis" Kahn. The game's primary antagonist is Dr. Nicholas Von Essen, a German expatriate and leader of Die Spinne (German, "The Spider"), a fascist militia force. The game originally featured a larger cast of onscreen characters and more abundant character development. These, however, were removed when the game's "playable movie" concept was scrapped.

=== Storyline ===
Crimson Skies: High Road to Revenge begins the morning after Nathan Zachary (Tim Omundson) the leader of the "Fortune Hunters" air pirates, has gambled away his signature fighter plane "Gypsy Magic" (a Hughes Devastator) and his pirate zeppelin, the Pandora, to the Ragin' Cajuns, a rival band of air pirates. Thibodeaux (Jimmie Woods), the Cajuns' leader, attempts to claim Zachary's fighter and Zeppelin; Nathan, however, with the aid of Betty, another member of the Fortune Hunters, manages to recover them both. Nathan and his crew have another run in with the Ragin Cajuns when Thibodeaux steals Betty's plane, which prompts Nathan to destroy his pirate gang. Later, Nathan receives a distress call from Nathan's old friend Dr. Fassenbiender (Neil Ross), who reports a break-in at his lab. He informs Nathan of what he believes had been the target of the attempted burglary: his plans to construct a wind turbine, a device capable of artificially generating storms. He warns Nathan about Von Essen (Charles Dennis), a scientist who had unsuccessfully tried to engineer a wind turbine for a German superweapon earlier during the Great War. Suspecting that Von Essen had been behind the break-in, Doc entrusts Nathan with the schematics for the turbine.

Nathan and the Fortune Hunters with the aid of a pirate ship captain, destroy the hidden base of the "Hollywood Knights", a militia run by the "Nation of Hollywood" dedicated to stopping Sky Piracy in the surrounding land. They then receive a distress call from Doc who reports being under attack. When Nathan and the Fortune Hunters return to Fassenbiender's lab, they find it under attack by several planes and a heavily-armored zeppelin belonging to Die Spinne, a mysterious faction with advanced weaponry. Upon destroying their zeppelin, its nose separates itself from the rest of the airship's wreckage and transforms into a spider-like walking tank. Although they repel the threat, they find that the attackers have still succeeded in killing the Doc. Nathan, along with Betty (Tasia Valenza), Big John (Wally Wingert), and the other Fortune Hunters, embarks on a campaign to find those responsible and have them "brought to justice." He and the Fortune Hunters travel to Arixo, seeking out a mine producing titanium, the only material that could be used to build the wind turbine; there, they hope to gain clues as to the identity of Doc's murderer. During his search, Nathan comes across Maria (Nika Futterman), who agrees to lead him to the titanium mine on the condition that she is allowed to join the Fortune Hunters. They run into a road block, as to get to the mine they must cross Navajo Nation which has had its borders closed. The Fortune Hunters retrieve a sacred statue and return it to the Navajo as a show of good will. Nathan also passes three tests set by the Navajo to prove his worth. Together they all continue to the mine, and discover that the mining operation is controlled by the Red Skull Legion, headed by a man named Khan, who Nathan personally knows. Nathan then proceeds in destroying the Red Skulls and a giant mechanical worm created by Die Spinne.

With the knowledge that the Red Skulls are working with Die Spinne, the Fortune Hunters proceed to Chicago, which is the Red Skulls' home base. When Nathan goes to confront Kahn, he and Betty are attacked. Betty is captured and Nathan escapes in a hijacked Red Skull plane. Nathan and the Fortune Hunters ally themselves with the DeCarlos, a Pirate gang battling Kahn for Chicago. After several clashes with the Skulls, Nathan rescues Betty and confronts Kahn (Keith Szarabajka) about his connection to Von Essen. Kahn reveals to Nathan that he had struck a deal with Die Spinne: in exchange for the titanium Die Spinne would help him destroy the DeCarlos, but Von Essen had gone back on their agreement, and begun using him to collect information. Kahn also discloses that Die Spinne is preparing to attack Chicago. Joining forces, the Fortune Hunters and Red Skulls successfully defeat Von Essen's invasion force (spearheaded by an enormous zeppelin capable of "eating" other zeppelins by forcing them through an opening in its hull filled with various cutting and crushing implements). During the ensuing victory celebration, however, Maria betrays Nathan and steals the blueprints for Doc's wind turbine.

The Fortune Hunters track Maria's movements southward to a "Lost City" in South America, which they identify as Von Essen's principal base of operations. Nathan infiltrates the base and there witnesses Maria and Von Essen have a falling out, following which Von Essen kills her. A firefight then ensues between Nathan and Von Essen, during which Von Essen reveals his plan to use the Starker Sturm —his completed wind turbine weapon—to force Chicago and eventually all of North America under his fascist rule. Von Essen activates hidden explosives causing the hide out to collapse. Nathan escapes but the Pandora is damaged by debris in the explosion and Von Essen escapes. After repairing the Pandora, Nathan and the Fortune Hunters return to Chicago and find it already besieged by Die Spinne. The Fortune Hunters and the Red Skulls once again join forces to stop the invasion. Von Essen then appears in the Starker Sturm, and begins to attack Chicago's vital commercial and governmental structures. Nathan destroys the war machines' power turbines causing it to explode, killing Von Essen in the ensuing explosion. As the game ends, Khan invites Nathan and the Fortune Hunters to a party to celebrate, saying he'll call ahead and tell them to put the drinks on ice. Remembering how the whole ordeal started, Nathan declines, saying that he is going to stay away from the gambling tables for a while.

== Development ==
Developers insisted early on that Crimson Skies: High Road to Revenge would not simply be a port of its predecessor Crimson Skies. Although Project Art Director Robert Olson complimented the radio play that frames the campaign of the previous title, he notes that a different presentation was needed for the game's new target audience. The development team decided upon an adventure along the vein of the Indiana Jones franchise, adding elements of "over-the-top, 1930's pulp-fiction style action", such as the game's boss battles. The style chosen by the developers led them to hire Drew Struzan, the artist responsible for the Indiana Jones film posters, to do the box art.

A AA gun targets a Zeppelin. As the airship takes damage, its skin slowly burns away, revealing its internal supporting structures.

Series creator Jordan Weisman noted that the game had a "difficult development", and went through many different creative directions. Throughout the development process, Weisman worked with the game designers to ensure that "the essence of the [Crimson Skies] IP was coming through". When development of Crimson Skies: High Road to Revenge was first assumed by FASA Studio, it was conceived that the game be made into an "interactive movie", a concept that would have involved an elaborate storyline and a large number of cutscenes. This process would have needed a linear mission design, potentially restricting gameplay. Programmer Patrick Schreiber later noted about the "playable movie" concept that "it looked great on paper, but […] was difficult to implement in a way where it felt like the player had some control over what was happening".

Consequently, developers pushed back the game's release date by a year in favor of increased development time. At this point, both playtest feedback and inspiration from games that offered more gameplay options helped shape the game's development. The game's "interactive movie" concept was scrapped, the storyline simplified, and the original linear mission design was reworked to promote more choice-driven gameplay. One example of this is the game's open-ended missions, which allow players to "explore the […] world of Crimson Skies: High Road to Revenge at their leisure". Another is the ability to substitute a fighter plane for a stationary weapon or another aircraft, which was added in order to give the player "different ways to accomplish the same goals".

The developers made several graphical improvements during this extended development period, focusing resources on improving the looks of the game's water and aircraft. The team also made the decision at this point to add online support to the game. This was an important decision for the game's developers due to the technical and gameplay obstacles involved, although their association with the team that produced MechAssault (another Xbox Live-enabled title by FASA Studio) managed to considerably reduce the amount of time needed to implement Xbox Live in High Road to Revenge.

The game's soundtrack was composed by Stan LePard, conducted by Adam Stern, and performed by the Northwest Sinfonia. The game's music was written to be "period" music true to the 1930s without being too derivative of any one particular style or composer. According to Stan LePard, the soundtrack takes inspiration from various sources, including Errol Flynn swashbucklers and the concert music of Igor Stravinsky and Richard Strauss. In composing the game's music, LePard chose to incorporate complex harmonies into his music so that the various tracks could be linked without having to make sure that the keys of the two pieces complimented each other. This allows the game to randomize the order of the game's battle themes and avoid looping the music in a predictable order. Initially, the game was to exclusively feature big band music. The resulting music was lighter in tone than the game required, so developers considered an orchestra in order to achieve a more cinematic approach. As a result, the audio team hired a full forty-piece orchestra to record the game's music.

Developers decided early in the game's development cycle that they wanted the game to have an interactive environment. When the game was first announced in 2002, features announced for the game included destructible environments which could be used to eliminate enemies, hidden areas containing bonus weapons, and "danger zones" similar in function to those featured in the previous Crimson Skies for the PC. Although many of these features were scrapped from the final version of the game, the game's art team still designed the environments to be more than just a backdrop. Spaces for planes to fly through were integrated into the game world to allow players to use the environment to their advantage.

The Xbox 360 is backward compatible with Crimson Skies: High Road to Revenge through a downloadable emulator. The game was also one of the first titles announced for the Xbox Originals service, which as of December 4, 2007 allowed Xbox 360 users to download the full retail game from the Xbox Live Marketplace. During Microsoft's E3 2017 press conference Crimson Skies was one of the first Xbox backward compatible titles for Xbox One. In July 2026, High Road to Revenge became one of the first backwards-compatible games from the original Xbox that was made playable on Windows through the Xbox on PC launcher, as part of Microsoft debuting the availability of legacy games from prior Xbox consoles on PC through emulation. It was subsequently made available across all tiers of Xbox Game Pass.

== Merchandise ==
In October 2002, Del Rey published the mass market paperback book Crimson Skies as an official tie-in to the Xbox game. The book is not a prequel to the Xbox game; it instead offers the backstory of the world of Crimson Skies, and also details the adventures of three of the series' main characters in the form of three short stories (the first two of which had been published previously on the Crimson Skies website):

- Paladin Blake and the Case of the Phantom Prototype by Eric Nylund
- The Manchurian Gambit by Michael B. Lee
- Bayou Blues by Nancy Berman and Eric S. Trautmann

Published a year before the final release date of Crimson Skies: High Road to Revenge, the book contains several inconsistencies with the final version of the game. Although billed as a tie-in with the game, numerous main characters and prominent aircraft from the book do not make an appearance in High Road to Revenge. In addition, the book contains a reference to a "Zeppelin casino," which was featured only in the E3 2002 demo build of the game.

The game's soundtrack was later released separately from the game by the record label Sumthing Else Musicworks. The soundtrack contains two discs—a CD featuring 54 tracks from the game, and a DVD containing Dolby Digital 5.1 surround sound mixes of the game trailer and two pieces from the soundtrack.

== Reception ==
Reception

Aggregate score
Aggregator	Score
Metacritic	88/100

Review scores
Publication	Score
Edge	7/10
Electronic Gaming Monthly	8.83/10
Eurogamer	8/10
Famitsu	32/40
Game Informer	9/10
GamePro	5/5
GameRevolution	A−
GameSpot	8.9/10
GameSpy	4/5
GameZone	9.5/10
IGN	9.1/10
Official Xbox Magazine (US)	9.2/10

Award
Publication	Award
7th Annual Interactive Achievement Awards	Console Action/Adventure Game of the Year

The game received "generally favorable reviews" according to the review aggregation website Metacritic. In Japan, where the game was ported for release on May 20, 2004, Famitsu gave it a score of one nine, two eights, and one seven for a total of 32 out of 40.

GameSpy described it as "one of the most fun, and almost more importantly, unique games to hit the scene in awhile [sic]". The game's graphics were very well-received by reviewers; of particular note were the game's explosions, long draw distance, fanciful plane models, and large, open environments. Critics wrote favorably of the game's audio, applauding strong voice acting as well as its swashbuckling and adventurous background music. Reviewers lauded the game's presentation, highlighting the contribution of the game's visuals and audio to the game's style and atmosphere.

Game Informer and GameSpot complimented the game's streamlined arcade control scheme, noting the ease with which it is possible to learn the game in comparison with other flight games. However, IGN noted that the gameplay would appeal more to casual players than flight sim fans. Reviewers also praised the game's mission design, with Edge magazine stating that "the mission structure is surprisingly open-ended", and that the ability to utilize stationary turrets "adds a much needed strategic aspect to combat and spices up the online play immeasurably".

The game's single-player campaign was generally well-received, partially because critics found its "escort missions" less frustrating than those in other flight games, and partially due to its depth in comparison to similar Microsoft Game Studio titles. Critics most notably acclaimed High Road to Revenge for its Xbox Live features, many describing the online component as the game's best feature. IGN said that "the freedom to fly […] in any direction and unleash tons of firepower on human opponents will want to make you hug your Xbox Live subscription", and commended elements such the game's capacity for 16-player matches and the quality of downloadable content.

Although Xbox Nation likewise approved of the game's action-oriented gameplay, the site criticized the "lame 'favors for everyone' mechanic" surrounding the missions, noting that the player is always forced to perform "chores" for other characters in the game. GameSpy noted that the game had "some repetitiveness". IGN disapproved of the game's undescriptive plane selection screen, which does not inform the player of a plane's weapons loadout. The website also disparaged the game's upgrade system, which was described as "dry and unimaginative" in comparison to the plane customization feature in the Crimson Skies PC game.

The game was not considered a best-selling title on the Xbox. The game had a software-to-hardware attach ratio of about one percent, and is considered to be a "cult classic".

GameSpot named it the best Xbox game of October 2003.

The game was awarded "Console Action/Adventure Game of the Year" by the Academy of Interactive Arts & Sciences during the 7th Annual Interactive Achievement Awards (now known as the D.I.C.E. Awards).
