= Circular Motion (novel) =

2025 novel by Alex Foster

Circular Motion is a 2025 science-fiction novel by Alex Foster.

== Themes and analysis ==
According to Abigail Nussbaum of Locus Magazine, the novel was about the possibility that "by continuing to do our work and going on with our lives, we are each, in tiny but ultimately cumulative ways, contributing to the apocalypse... When it comes down to it, however, this is not a novel with villains – or rather, it is one in which we are all villains. As Tanner realizes, the lesson of his life is both true and horrifying: 'The world had been capable of rapid change all along, and our grandparents, and then our parents, and then we ourselves had changed it for the worse.'" Writing in The Guardian, Adam Roberts noted that the novel was "a metaphor for climate change" that "dramatises people’s incapacity, or more precisely their unwillingness, to address the problems they are causing the world."

In an interview with The Washington Square News, Foster stated that his idea for the novel originated when he spent time working for the World Bank, saying that "the work in Ghana had me thinking a lot about globalization, the way that corporate decisions on one side of the world affect life an ocean away... People find themselves in jobs after college where they are working really hard and feeling that the work they do is not making people’s lives better — and maybe even the harder they work, the more they’re hurting people. What was somewhat unique in my case, is that my work was in economics. So while I was having this sort of personal experience, I was also studying the very systems in which this experience was located."

== Reception ==
Kirkus Reviews reviewed the novel as "equal parts ambitious and intimate, with enough humanity and empathy to keep weighty themes from swallowing it whole." Jonathan Russell Clark of The Washington Post wrote that "Foster has a knack for delicately balancing the emotional stakes for these deeply drawn characters with the dispensing, at a breakneck pace, of a great deal of information, exposition and global developments," praising the novel for being "both wildly imaginative and deeply emotional."

Publishers Weekly described the novel as "exciting," saying that "Fans of gleeful and unflinching satire will find plenty to love." Henry Bankhead of the Library Journal described the novel as "a grimly compelling view of the future that imagines technological improvements in a fresh way; recommended for fans of stories about dystopian futures."
