= Star Warped (novel) =

2005 novel by Adam Roberts

- Cover of the first edition
- Author: Adam Roberts
- Language: English
- Publication date: 2005
- Publication place: United Kingdom

Star Warped is a farcical 2005 spoof novel by British writer Adam Roberts, based on the six Star Wars films.

== Plot synopsis ==
The story takes place in the production order of the films, rather than the chronological order, starting with episodes 4-6 and ending with episodes 1–3. The bulk of the story concentrates on the character of Luke Seespotrun as he joins the Rebelend in their struggle against the nefarious forces of the Imperial Empire of the Imperium, trying to prevent them from enslaving the entire galaxy.

Due to page restrictions the last three episodes are heavily abbreviated with Episode II being only three chapters and Episode III only one chapter long.

=== The Chapters ===
- Episode IV: A Nude Hope
- Episode V: The Empire Strides around in Black
- Episode VI: Return of the Son of Jobbi Rides Again
- Episode I: The Fans-of-Tron Menace
- Episode II: Attack of the Clichés
- Episode III: Revenge of the Return of the Son of Psmyth Rides Again: the Next Generation - The Early Years

== Characters ==
- Luke Seespotrun is based on Luke Skywalker. He is brought up on the desert world of Tatuonweiner by his nudist Swedish Uncle Sven and Aunt Svenessa. He has acne.
- Princess Leper is based on Princess Leia, and has leprosy.
- Old Bony Knobbli / Wobbli Bent Knobbli is based on Obi-Wan. He has arthritis.
- C3U-πP-HOL-8RA, pronounced "See-thru-peephole-bra" and often abbreviated as "C3", is based on C-3PO.
- RC-DU², pronounced Arcee Doodoo, is a human-phobic motile commode based on R2-D2,.
- Hand Someman is based on Han Solo. He had both of his lungs shot and replaced by artificial ones during the progress of the first episode.
- Masticate tobacco is based on Chewbacca. Being a Woozie, he sleeps six months out of the seven-month year of the Woozies. He finally awakes at the end of Episode VI.
- Jane Seespotrun / Dark Father is based on Anakin Skywalker / Darth Vader. His mother's name was Dick. In episodes 4-6 he is an urging but a hopelessly bad stand-up comedian, but otherwise true to his origins.
- The Emperor / Dark Charlie is based largely on Charles Chaplin's popular character, The Tramp. His voice is lost during Episode III and he is forced to speak with a black sheet of re-writable plastic (in the fashion of silent films).
- Yodella is based on Yoda. Rather similar to the original character except he yodels his lessons and wears lederhosen.

== See also ==
- Star Warped video game
- The Soddit novel
