= Rainway =

Former video game streaming service

- Developer: Rainway Inc.
- Release: January 20, 2018; 8 years ago
- Final release: 1.0.17.0 / August 30, 2019; 7 years ago
- Written in: C#, JavaScript, React, Dart, Flutter, C++
- Operating system: Dashboard: Windows 10; Client: Browsers, iOS (beta)
- Type: Video game streaming

Rainway was a remote desktop video game streaming service for Microsoft Windows. It allowed users to stream locally installed applications to other devices over a WLAN or internet connection. The initial beta version launched on January 20, 2018. Version 1.0 of the software launched on January 31, 2019. In April 2021, the company announced a partnership with Microsoft to implement their streaming technology into Xbox Cloud Gaming.

== Compatibility ==
Rainway is compatible with games purchased from Steam, Origin, Battle.net, itch.io, GOG.com and Uplay. The service can run in web browsers and is also compatible with iOS and Android mobile phones. The iOS version of the app was limited to only local network streaming, as a result of Apple's attitude towards game streaming apps. Rainway released a client version for Xbox One consoles in January 2020, though it was removed from the store just a month later.

== History ==
Rainway was announced in March 2017. The announcement was made on the official website for Ulterius, another streaming service worked on by founder Andrew Sampson which used similar technologies, but focused on desktop remote access rather than game streaming. Rainway did not gain significant attention until April, when it announced its plan to support the then-newly released Nintendo Switch console. During E3 2017, Rainway announced that the Rainway beta would launch on November 25. The release of the beta was later delayed again, to January 20, 2018.

In August 2018, Rainway closed its seed round, having raised $1.5 million in seed funding from GoAhead Ventures. The software left beta on January 31, 2019, with the release of version 1.0.

Later in 2019, David Perry (former CEO of Gaikai) and Jon Kimmich joined the company's advisory board, as it closed another $3.5 million round of funding. Investors included Bullpen Capital, Madrona Venture Group, GoAhead Ventures, and Bill Mooney. An iOS public beta version was released on September 9, 2019.

== See also ==
- Cloud gaming
