= The Da Vinci Treasure =

- DVD cover art
- Directed by: Peter Mervis
- Written by: Paul Bales; Carlos De Los Rios
- Produced by: David Michael Latt; David Rimawi; Sherri Strain
- Starring: C. Thomas Howell; Lance Henriksen; Nicole Sherwin; Alexis Zibolis; Elvis Naumovski
- Distributed by: The Asylum
- Release date: May 23, 2006
- Running time: 90 minutes
- Country: United States
- Language: English
- Budget: $850,000

The Da Vinci Treasure is a 2006 direct-to-video mystery film produced by American studio The Asylum, and directed by Peter Mervis.

The film is considered to be a mockbuster of the 2006 film The Da Vinci Code, and both films were released within the same month.

== Plot ==
The film centres on Michael Archer (C. Thomas Howell), a forensic anthropologist who inadvertently discovers a set of subtle clues within the works of Leonardo da Vinci, that, when interpreted correctly, will lead the finder to "enlightenment".

Archer, convinced of the authenticity of the clues, sets out to locate the treasure by travelling around the world, following each clue. As time passes, however, Archer soon realizes that he is not alone in the quest for the treasure, and that he must combat other, more determined, treasure-seekers who would sooner see him dead.

The secret has the potential to shake the foundations of modern society.

== Cast ==
- C. Thomas Howell as Michael Archer
- Lance Henriksen as Dr. John Coven
- Nicole Sherwin as Giulia Pedina
- Alexis Zibolis as Samantha West

== Reception ==
The eFilmCritic, while stating that The Asylum can make the occasionally good movie, found this movie to rip off both The Da Vinci Code and National Treasure, and found the movie "disappointing and lazy" with failed attempts to be historically accurate. TV Guide found the movie to be "cheap". Radio Times gave the movie one star out of five.

== See also ==
- Cultural references to Leonardo da Vinci
- List of American films of 2006
- The Va Dinci Cod – A parody of The Da Vinci Code by comedian Adam Roberts
