= Splinter (novel) =

2007 novel by Adam Roberts

- First edition
- Author: Adam Roberts
- Cover artist: Darius Hinks
- Language: English
- Genre: Science fiction
- Publisher: Solaris Books
- Publication date: September 2007
- Publication place: United Kingdom
- Media type: Print (Hardcover & Paperback)
- Pages: 252
- ISBN: 1-84416-490-X
- OCLC: 153558628

Splinter is a science fiction novel by the British writer Adam Roberts, published in 2007. It is based on an earlier story by the author, "Hector Servadac, fils", which was part of The Mammoth Book of Jules Verne Adventures. It is a reworking of Off on a Comet, an 1877 novel by Jules Verne. The hardcover edition of the novel is included in a slipcase with a hardcover edition of Off on a Comet.

== Plot summary ==
As in Verne's novel, the main character is Hector Servadac, however, instead of being stranded on the comet while serving in the French Algerian army, his father is a supporter of a doomsday cult and Servadac is stranded on a splinter of the shattered Earth when the planet is destroyed by a comet. Roberts described the central metaphor as "the trope that the world might end and that we might not even be sure it has happened. We surely wouldn't be wholly oblivious (this is the end of the world we're talking about, after all!) But we might not be wholly certain, either. There would be a lengthy transition period during which we would become increasingly convinced that something substantial had changed in our lives."

== Reception ==
In the SF Encyclopedia, John Clute described Splinter as an "enjoyable homage to and gloss upon the Verne novel."
