= The Asti Spumante Code =

2005 parody novel by Dan Brown

- Author: Toby Clements
- Language: English
- Genre: Parody; Thriller
- Publisher: Time Warner Books
- Publication date: 2005
- Publication place: United Kingdom
- Media type: Print (paperback only)
- Pages: 247 pp (May change depending on the publisher and the size of the text)
- ISBN: 978-0-7515-3768-0
- OCLC: 60319730

The Asti Spumante Code (full title: The Asti Spumante Code: A Parody) is a 2005 parody novel written by Toby Clements as a parody of The Da Vinci Code by Dan Brown. It is noteworthy for being among the first works of fiction to parody the Dan Brown novel.

== Plot ==
Due to the detailed nature of the overall story within the novel, the plot has been divided into Backstory, and Modern Day respectively in order to provide a more coherent timeline for the events depicted in the novel.

=== Backstory ===
In the 13th century, there once existed a circle of authors and playwrights known as the Order of Psion (a parody of the Knights Templar), most of whom were females writing under male pseudonyms, who once predicted the coming of "the ultimate book" that would render publishers obsolete. The formula for the making of the ultimate book – known as the Asti Spumante Code – is contained within the Mure de Paume (French for "The Blackberry of the Palm"), otherwise known as "the legendary keystone".

Fearing the consequences of the ultimate book, a group of publishers named The English Book Guild was established in Stevenage, England to try to counteract the progresses made by the Order.

=== Modern day ===
The book itself focuses on American Prof. James Crack – a professor of "Paraliteral Metasymbolist studies" – and Belgian Emily Raquin, a "biblio technical cryptologist", as they discover a set of clues left by the deceased Grand Master of the Order of Psion that will ultimately lead to the discovery of the Asti Spumante Code.

However, the two are hindered by the efforts of Uxbridge Road Group, a fanatical offshoot of the English Book Guild situated in Brussels, whose members encourage sadomasochism and segregate works of fiction by gender stereotyping (e.g.: men read only adventure fiction, women read only romance novels), who wish to destroy the Asti Spumante Code before it can be put to use by anyone.

== See also ==
- The Da Vinci Code – The novel by Dan Brown
- The Da Vinci Treasure – A 2006 film by The Asylum
