= Crimson Skies (video game) =

2000 video game

- Developer: Zipper Interactive
- Publishers: Microsoft Games; Tsunami Visual Technologies (Arcade)
- Designers: Jordan Weisman; John Howard
- Series: Crimson Skies
- Platforms: Microsoft Windows, Arcade
- Release: Windows: NA: September 18, 2000; EU: October 13, 2000; Arcade; 2002
- Genres: Action, arcade flight
- Modes: Single-player, multiplayer

Crimson Skies is an arcade flight video game developed by Zipper Interactive and published in 2000 by Microsoft Games. Although a flight-based game, Crimson Skies is not a genuine flight simulator, as the game is based less on flight mechanics than on action. According to series creator Jordan Weisman, Crimson Skies is "not about simulating reality—it's about fulfilling fantasies".

The game is loosely based on the 1998 board game of the same name, set in an alternate history of the 1930s in which the United States has fragmented into a number of smaller sovereignties, and in which air travel has become the primary mode of transportation in North America. The game centers on Nathan Zachary, an adventurous air pirate seeking to rob the affluent of their wealth and power. Throughout the campaign, Zachary leads his gang of air pirates, the Fortune Hunters, on a quest to gain fame and riches.

The game received generally favorable reviews; it had been noted for its high-quality voice acting, gameplay, and atmosphere. Notable technical issues, however, were known to plague the game, the most notorious of which was the tendency to delete saved game files until a patch was released. The game was later ported to arcade games in 2002.

== Gameplay ==
Crimson Skies is a cross between an authentic flight simulator and an arcade flight game. Although flight mechanics such as lift are still present, the game's planes are generally overpowered, allowing them to perform aerobatic maneuvers impossible in reality under similar circumstances. According to lead game designer John Howard:

We're not trying to build a realistic flight simulation, but at the same time, Crimson Skies isn't a cartoony, arcade-type game, either. We had to find a middle ground, where the planes were more powerful, more responsive and more intuitive to fly, so that the player can just concentrate on being a hero.

GameSpot claimed that "the flight model in Crimson Skies is light on the physics and heavy on the barnstorming". In this way, the site likened the game's arcade flight model to the "stunt-flying heroics of pulp novel fame", in which "daredevil pilots performed unbelievable (and quite impossible) feats of showmanship and gunnery". To this effect, the game features select "danger zones"—difficult spaces situated throughout the environment through which the player can fly to dissuade pursuing aircraft. Such stunts are also documented in the player's "scrapbook", which is the game's record of the player's accomplishments throughout the campaign.

The gameplay of Crimson Skies takes place through the player controlling an aircraft through the game's various environments. The game offers three cameras during missions: first-person perspectives with or without a cockpit visible, and a third-person view. The game's heads-up display features basic flight instrumentation such as the compass, altimeter, and speedometer, as well as a damage indicator for the player's aircraft and ammunition displays for the plane's primary and secondary weapons. The game also provides the player with a feature known as the "spyglass", which provides a magnified image of the selected target and indicates its current heading.

The game features eleven different playable aircraft, each of which can be customized. For any aircraft, the player can select its airframe, engine, armor, weapons layout, and paint scheme, although customization is limited by the weight capacity of the airframe and—in the single-player campaign—the player's cash on hand. Outfitting an aircraft with different components affects its performance in terms of speed, maneuverability, stamina, and offense. The player is also able to equip the aircraft's guns and hardpoints with different types of ammunition and rockets, respectively.

The game's single-player campaign has three difficulty levels, and spans twenty-four missions. Before the start of a mission, players select the plane and ammunition for both themselves and their wingmates, although wingmate commands are not available during gameplay.

In addition to the campaign, an instant action mode is available which allows the player to play individual missions or customized scenarios. Multiplayer is also available through the Reverb Gaming lobby, over a LAN or the Internet, or via a direct serial connection. Players can host games or join existing ones; the host selects the game's victory conditions and allowable aircraft components/ammunition. Multiplayer game modes include dogfight, capture the flag, and Zeppelin-to-Zeppelin combat.

== Plot ==
=== Setting ===
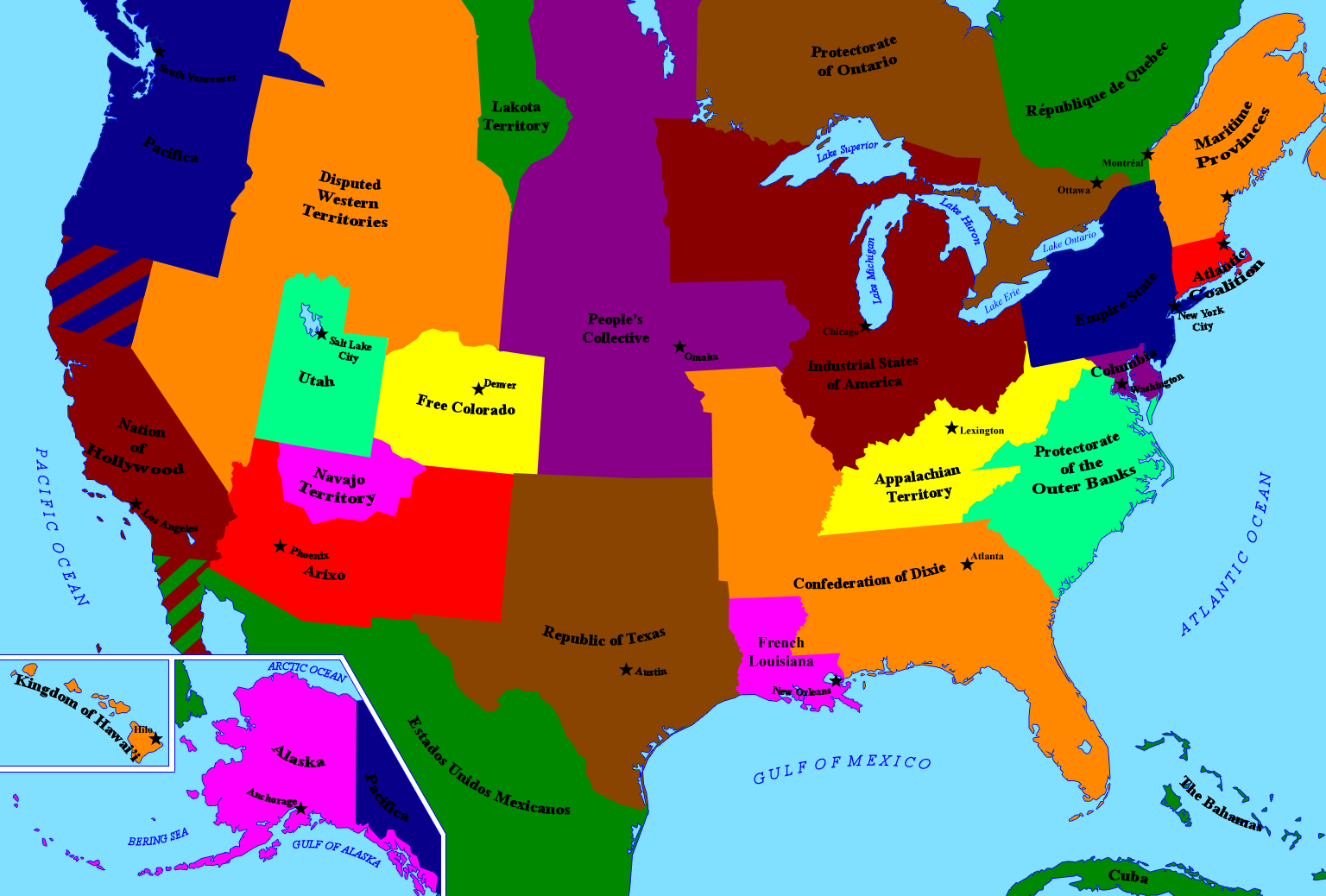
North America in the fictional Crimson Skies universe

The Crimson Skies universe is set in an alternate history of the year 1937. According to the game's backstory, factors such as the growing strength of the "Regionalist Party", the division between "wet" and "dry" states, and a quarantine caused by an Influenza outbreak resulted in a general shift in power from federal to state and local levels. After the Wall Street crash of 1929, states began seceding from the United States. A number of independent nation-states form from the fractured United States; hostilities between these sovereignties eventually escalate into outright war.

After the breakup of America, the former nation's railroad and highway systems fell into disuse as they crossed hostile borders. Consequently, the airplane and the airship became the primary modes of transportation in North America, which in turn gave birth to air piracy. Although air militias formed to defend against the air pirates, continuous brushfire wars between the nations prevent the established governments from effectively repelling the pirate threat.

=== Characters ===
The player character is Nathan Zachary, a man well known in the game world as a reputable ladies' man and a notorious air pirate. He is the leader of a group of air pirates, the Fortune Hunters. Zachary dislikes the wealthy and privileged, seeing them as selfish and insensitive towards the less privileged; as a result, Zachary and his gang have a penchant for stripping the rich of their money and influence. Zachary's "articles of piracy" insist that his gang are not to harm the innocent, and that they steal only from those who can afford the loss. IGN stated that the Fortune Hunters are "wonderfully ambiguous […] in the moral sense", qualifying that "it's always great to see heroes […] who aren't too good to be true."

The Fortune Hunters are based on the Zeppelin Pandora, and comprise the airship's crew as well as six pilots—Nathan Zachary and his wingman Jack Mulligan, "Tex" Ryder and her wingman "Buck" Deere, "Big John" Washington and Betty "Brooklyn" Charles. Later joining Nathan and his gang are Dr. Wilhelm Fassenbiender, a German scientist and friend of Nathan's since World War I, as well as his daughter, Dr. Ilse Fassenbiender.

Opposing the Fortune Hunters are rival pirates and privateers, such as The Black Swan, Jonathan "Genghis" Kahn, and Ulysses Boothe. Also fighting Zachary and his gang are private security firms such as Blake Aviation Security and militia squadrons such as the Hollywood Knights. Many of these opponents are old rivals or former love interests of Nathan Zachary.

=== Storyline ===
In Cuba, ace pilot Nathan Zachary and his crew of air pirates, the "Fortune Hunters", are betrayed by ally and fellow pirate Lucas Miles following their latest score, resulting in Nathan ordering his crew to open fire on Miles' Zeppelin and seemingly killing him, while the Fortune Hunters flee to safety.

Later, Nathan discovers a treasure map leading to the wreck of Sir Francis Drake’s ship in the Hawaiian Islands, and the Fortune Hunters head there to look for it. After clashing with rival air pirate gang "The Medusas", who want the ship’s treasure for themselves, the Fortune Hunters discover that British military forces are seeking to colonize Hawaii. The Fortune Hunters then attack a British base to thwart their invasion. The Fortune Hunters then return to the site of the wreck and successfully salvage it, but not before encountering and defeating the Medusas once more.

As the Fortune Hunters are leaving Hawaii, Nathan receives a transmission from Ilse Fassenbeinder, the daughter of his friend from the Great War, Dr. Wilhelm Fassenbeinder; she explains that her father has been taken into custody by the Soviet Cheka secret police, which leads the Fortune Hunters to Pacifica. There, they find Dr. Fassenbeinder imprisoned on a Soviet airship, which the Fortune Hunters attack, rescuing him. During the attack, Nathan and his crew are ambushed by his old flame, the "Black Swan" and her gang, but are defeated. The Fortune Hunters then go to recover Ilse from a Boeing facility in Pacifica, rescuing her from a speeding train in mid-air before stealing an expensive prototype aircraft. The Fortune Hunters are threatened by Paladin Blake, CEO of anti-piracy security firm Blake Aviation Security, to leave Pacifica or be forced to deal with his sizable armada. However, the Fortune Hunters sabotage his airship and destroy it, and also defeat Blake in a dogfight. This results in severe public embarrassment for Blake and his private militia, and rival security firm Sacred Trust Incorporated begins rising in notoriety.

After travelling to the 'Nation of Hollywood', formerly Los Angeles, California, Nathan encounters his old Wall Street rival Johnny Johnson, now handling security affairs for Hughes Aviation. After kidnapping screen actress Lana Cooper in a daring heist, an embarrassed Johnny attempts to save face by showing off Hughes Aviation’s newest accomplishment: the largest plane constructed, the Spruce Goose. Nathan decides to humiliate Johnny further by having the Fortune Hunters steal it. Following this, Nathan is invited to a stunt race to show of his skills as a pilot; the race is eventually revealed to be a trap planned by Johnny and Charlie Steele, the leader of the "Hollywood Knights" whom previously attempted to stop the Fortune Hunters from rescuing Lana and stealing the Spruce Goose. Rival pirate gang leaders Jonathan Kahn and Bill Redman also join the fight, but Nathan manages to gain the upper hand with assistance from The Black Swan and Loyle Crawford, leader of the "Broadway Bombers". Nathan realizes that the trap was meant to lure him away from the Pandora to give Johnny’s forces an opening to attack it, and he quickly mobilizes the Fortune Hunters to defend their airship. Though they emerge victorious, the Pandora suffers heavy damage from the fight, and the Fortune Hunters decide to commandeer a cargo airship to tow the Pandora to safety.

In the pirate city of 'Sky Haven' in Colorado, Nathan and the Black Swan’s crews are kidnapped by the Black Hat gang, a ruthless band of air pirates noted for their cruelty. During a dogfight, Nathan and Swan discover hints of a conspiracy between the Black Hats and Sacred Trust Incorporated, who appear to be colluding with one another. After Nathan rescues the Fortune Hunters' chief engineer, Eugene 'Sparks' Rasmussen, Nathan goes to confront Ulysses Boothe, the captain of the Black Hats. Nathan defeats Boothe in an aerial duel and uses him as a hostage in exchange for the crews' location. Nathan and the Black Swan then learn that their crews are being held in an airship that is rigged to explode. Though the Black Hats try to double cross them, Nathan manages to rescue both crews. However, the Black Swan is shot down and captured in the process. Now reunited, the Fortune Hunters attack the Black Hat's headquarters in an effort to rescue the Black Swan. During the heist, Zachary discovers proof of a conspiracy between Sacred Trust, the Black Hats, and the Nazi German government to destroy Blake Aviation Security, leaving Sacred Trust Incorporated as the premiere security firm in North America. Nathan then decides to ask Blake for assistance, and he earns his trust by helping him fend off a Black Hat attack.

Nathan and Blake head to New York, where they aim to deal with Sacred Trust personally. Nathan sabotages one of the Black Hats' illegal operations, destroying a German freighter and a warehouse containing stolen loot. Later, the Fortune Hunters learn that a Sacred Trust accountant has evidence of Black Hat pirates and German spies working together, and tries to flee the country, but is attacked by the Black Hats while in transit. Nathan saves the accountant, and brings him to the police for safety. Acting on the accountant’s information, the Fortune Hunters sabotage attempts by Sacred Trust in getting their loot back to Germany via three cargo Zeppelins; they eventually manage to stop the exodus. The Fortune Hunters soon learn that the true mastermind behind the conspiracy is Lucas Miles, who has survived and pulled the strings of Sacred Trust from the shadows. He then challenges the Fortune Hunters to one last confrontation, but is ultimately defeated by the combined efforts of the Fortune Hunters and the Black Swan. Nathan then chases after Lucas, who has taken Lana hostage, but she manages to escape his plane, allowing Nathan to shoot Lucas down.

Nathan is offered membership to Blake Aviation but turns it down, much to Blake’s outrage. Nathan then plans with the Black Swan to look for treasure in South America, as their airships fly off into the sunset.

== Development ==
Jordan Weisman, series creator and creative director of Crimson Skies, has said of the game: "Our whole goal is to give the player the kind of role of being Errol Flynn in a 1930's, 1940's great pirate adventure film of the air." According to Weisman, the inspiration for the game came after he had done research on the early years of aviation; he wished to create a game about the era. Weisman and Dave McCoy came up with the concept of "combining the classic fantasies of pilots and pirates." They then created the series' backstory by proposing changes to the history of the United States that would allow the rise of air piracy.

Development on the game originally began for Virtual World Entertainment, and was changed to a PC game under the name "Corsairs!". This original project was shelved, however, prompting Weisman and others to create the board game Crimson Skies. When FASA later became a part of Microsoft, Weisman was given the opportunity to work on a new project; his choice was to restart production of the Crimson Skies PC game.

The prototype version of the game was intended to have more elements of the 1998 board game of the same name, featuring additional planes like Raven and Avenger, a grand canyon level, and commandeering your wingmen. The developer, however, decided to scrap some of the board game's elements. Intended to be released in the summer of 2000 but pushed back to September 18 of the same year, the game's release shipped with numerous technical problems, one of the most notorious was the tendency to delete the player's saved game files. Shortly after the game's release, Microsoft released Crimson Skies Update Version 1.01, a patch specifically designed to fix this problem. Microsoft later released Update Version 1.02 to address other issues, including multiplayer game stability and mission load times.

== Reception ==
Reception

Aggregate score
Aggregator	Score
Metacritic	83/100

Review scores
Publication	Score
CNET Gamecenter	7/10
Computer Games Strategy Plus	3.5/5
Computer Gaming World	4/5
Edge	5/10
Eurogamer	8/10
Game Informer	8.25/10
GamePro	4.5/5
GameRevolution	A−
GameSpot	7.7/10
GameSpy	84%
GameZone	5/10
IGN	8.8/10
Next Generation	5/5
PC Gamer (US)	85%
The Cincinnati Enquirer	3.5/5

The PC version received "favorable" reviews according to the review aggregation website Metacritic. Bruce Geryk of GameSpot said that "Crimson Skies does an excellent job of taking the elements of flight simulations that have broad appeal—the shooting and the fancy flying—and embellishing them with a great environment and a good story." Steve Butts of IGN called the game "highly inventive, tons of fun and ridiculously addictive"; the website later ranked the game as #65 and #75 respectively on its 2003 and 2005 lists of the "Top 100 Games of All Time".

Butts lauded the game's arcade-style physics model in IGN's first impressions, stating that it made gameplay "exciting and immediate". Geryk likewise complimented the arcade flight model, stating that it fit with the game's pulp fiction setting and allowed for elaborate stunt flying and fast-paced dogfighting. Other positively received aspects of gameplay include the game's "scrapbook" and aircraft customization features.

The game's visuals were generally well-received, as was its audio. Critics took particular note of the game's voice talent, which was described as among the best found in computer games up to that time. The Crimson Skies universe was also well-received by critics, who found it highly original and described it as an "alternate history that is rare in being both compelling and believable". Critics also commended the way these elements—voice acting, soundtrack, graphics style, and story—combined to contribute to the game's 1930s pulp fiction atmosphere.

The single-player campaign in Crimson Skies was criticized for its overall linearity, and Geryk found that multiple playthroughs of a mission would become "tiresome". The game was most heavily criticized for its numerous and notable technical issues, which include choppy framerate, missing textures, crash bugs, slowdown during menu screens, flawed wingman AI, long loading times for game levels, and the unreliability of saved game files.

Butts commented that "there are some serious issues with the game that need to be addressed […] in order to help the game realize its amazing potential." According to Geryk: "Unfortunately, the game is […] a reminder of how easily technical problems can defeat a promising design." Edge stated that gameplay is directly affected by these problems, as long loading times force players to "play it safe" and avoid the "improbable stunts that should be the signature of [the] game"; the review concludes as "a shame, because in its variety of missions and sheer panache, the dashing Crimson Skies almost steals your heart." Chris Kramer of NextGen, however, called it "a breath of fresh air: fun, fantastic, and different."

CNET Gamecenter's Mark Asher noted that the game was commercially unsuccessful. It is regarded as a "cult favorite" or a "cult success", generally popular only within a limited "cult following".

The staff of Computer Games Magazine nominated the PC version for their 2000 "Sci-Fi Simulation of the Year" award, whose winner remains unknown. During the 4th Annual Interactive Achievement Awards, the Academy of Interactive Arts & Sciences nominated Crimson Skies for the "PC Action/Adventure" and "Computer Innovation" awards, both of which ultimately went to Deus Ex. It was also nominated for the "Best Story" and "Sci-fi Simulation of the Year" awards at GameSpot's Best and Worst of 2000 Awards, both of which went to The Longest Journey and MechWarrior 4: Vengeance; and for the Action award at Computer Gaming World's 2001 Premier Awards, which went to The Operative: No One Lives Forever. It won the award for "Sound" at GameSpy's Best of 2000 Awards.

== See also ==
- Microsoft Combat Flight Simulator
- Crimson Skies: High Road to Revenge
