= On (novel) =

2001 novel by Adam Roberts

- First edition
- Author: Adam Roberts
- Language: English
- Genre: Science fiction
- Publisher: Gollancz
- Publication date: 2001
- Publication place: United Kingdom
- Media type: Print
- Pages: 400
- ISBN: 0-575-07176-1
- OCLC: 46332470
- Dewey Decimal: 823.92 21
- LC Class: PR6118.O23 O5 2001

On is a science fiction novel by British writer Adam Roberts, his second long work of fiction.

== Plot summary ==
The story follows the life of an adolescent named Tighe (pronounced, roughly, Tig-Hee). Tighe's village is built on the ledges and crags of an enormous cliff-face, called the Wall or the World-wall. Every morning, the sun rises from the bottom of the wall, and every evening it sets at the top. The first part of the novel introduces Tighe and the hardness of life in his village, the abuse Tighe receives from his family members, and the unusual (to us) state of his world. Partway through this part of the book, Tighe's parents mysteriously disappear, and his grandfather takes care of him. Tighe concludes that his parents must have fallen off the wall. Eventually Tighe himself falls off, falls over 10 miles, and lands in the midst of an army preparing for war. He survives.

While recovering from his injuries, he learns the local language, and that the army will soon attack the Otre, a nearby civilisation. Tighe is drafted into the army, but the campaign goes badly, and Tighe's entire platoon is lost. Tighe himself is captured by the Otre and sold as a slave. During the battle, he sees a silvery flying object that he takes as an enemy balloon, and that calls his name. However, he is forced to run from Otre troops before he can react.

The slave trader who buys Tighe takes him on a long journey across the wall, intending to sell him in a large city. Before arriving at the city, they again encounter the silvery flying object. The pilot is a man who speaks Tighe's native language, and looks very like his grandfather. He kills the slave trader and takes Tighe on board his craft. Tighe's mother is on board, but in a nonresponsive mental state.

The pilot, who Tighe calls Wizard, is in control of technology that is highly advanced by our standard, almost incomprehensibly so for Tighe. He tries to explain that gravity once pointed towards the centre of the Earth, but catastrophically changed due to mankind's over-dependence on Zero Point Energy as an energy source. He explains that he had implanted machinery in Tighe's and his mother's brain when they were young, but he avoids Tighe's questions about his identity, or where Tighe's father is. Tighe grows to mistrust the Wizard, and after his mother dies, he shoots the Wizard in the eye with a firearm. This only blinds and irritates the Wizard, but it gives Tighe the opportunity to escape from the Wizard's craft. The environment outside the craft is inhospitable, but Tighe is rescued by others with similar technology to the Wizard's. They question him, and release him.

The last two chapters describe how Tighe makes his way slowly back in the direction of his village. The story ends with Tighe rounding a corner on a shelf, and suddenly re-encountering the Wizard, whose plans for Tighe have apparently not changed. According to the author's website, this ending received some criticism, but seemed to the author to be the only possible way the story could end.
