= Crimson Skies (board game) =

Board game

- Publishers: FASA
- Publication: 1998; 28 years ago

Crimson Skies is an alternate history dieselpunk pulp fiction air-to-air combat board game franchise that was published by FASA in 1998.

== Premise ==
The game is set in an alternate timeline 1937 where the Spanish flu had more prevalent, which resulted in the Eighteenth Amendment to the United States Constitution not being ratified and prohibition being a state-by-state issue and leading to rum-running from wet states into dry states. The increased tensions over this, coupled with another flu epidemic further weakening the United States federal government and the Black Monday (1929) stock market crash 1929, resulted in Texas seceding on January 1, 1930 and the subsequent breakup of the United States of America. Aviation became the new method of travel across North America due to highways and railroads being rendered useless because of all the new international borders, with air piracy following quickly and the need for fighter planes to combat it.

== Gameplay ==
The Crimson Skies board game was released by FASA in 1998. The base game came with card stock, assemble-yourself airplanes included, but later metal miniature planes were offered separately.

== Development ==
According to developer John Howard, development on the Crimson Skies board game was "literally an after hours effort" by a group of FASA employees organized by Jordan Weisman, resulting from the team's interest in the Crimson Skies universe.

== Reception ==
The reviewer from the online second volume of Pyramid stated that "I thoroughly enjoy Crimson Skies, FASA's new board game of aerial combat. The combination of a unique game world and fast play have given me a new perspective about what everyone has been so keen on all this time".

The Crimson Skies board game won the Origins Awards for "Best Science Fiction or Fantasy Board Game" and "Best Graphic Presentation of a Board Game" of 1998.

== Reviews ==
- Backstab #14
