= Purgatory Mount =

2021 novel by Adam Roberts

- First edition cover
- Author: Adam Roberts
- Language: English
- Genre: Science fiction, space opera, dystopia
- Publisher: Gollancz
- Publication date: February 2021
- Publication place: United Kingdom
- Media type: Hardback
- Pages: 336
- ISBN: 978-1-4732-3094-1

Purgatory Mount is a 2021 science fiction novel by British writer Adam Roberts. It was first published in the United Kingdom in February 2021 by Victor Gollancz Ltd. The book appeared in some pre-publication listings as Mount Purgatory.

Purgatory Mount was nominated for the 2022 British Science Fiction Association Award for Best Novel.

== Plot introduction ==
Purgatory Mount takes place in two timelines, the near future in the United States, and the deep-future aboard the Forward, a kilometre-long starship.

The story opens aboard the Forward. After traveling for a century, the ship arrives at a planet designated V538 Aurigae γ in the V538 Aurigae system. The ship's crew of five, Captain Zeus, Apollo, Dionysus, Hades and Pan, are near-immortal posthumans. Among their physical and perceptual modifications, they have the ability to control the passage of time, to slow it down to make a hundred years feel like a few weeks, and speed it up to match clock-time. The crew's interest in the planet is that it has a huge conical structure 142 kilometre high that reaches above the world's atmosphere. It resembles a mountain, but, they conclude, it must have been constructed to support its weight. They name it "Purgatory Mount", after Dante's fictional mountain "Mount Purgatory" in the Divine Comedy.

In the 2030s in the United States, teenager Otty, and her friends, Gomery, Kath, Cess and Allie communicate with each other via a private internet they built to avoid being spied on by the authorities. California has issued a unilateral declaration of independence and the country is on the brink of civil war. Otty and Gomery are arrested by Government agents and held at separate facilities where they are interrogated. The authorities want access to the group's network, but the pair refuse to give it to them. War breaks out between the Government and the Freedom Militia and the country quickly degenerates into chaos. Gomery escapes and Otty is released after she is abandoned by her captors. Otty reunites with Allie and learns that they are the sole survivors of their group. It is revealed that Allie is an advanced AI and it is Allie that the government was after. Otty, devastated at the loss of her friends, lets Allie loose on the internet at large, where it quickly infiltrates and controls all the world's computer systems.

The book returns to the Forward, where the ship's crew set to work investigating Purgatory Mount. While robots traverse the mountain's terraces, trying to establish what material the edifice is made of, some of the crew travel to the planet's surface to supervise the construction of a power plant. But Pan refuses to participate, stating that Purgatory Mount is Dante's Mount Purgatory, and that the crew must all atone for their sins by climbing the mountain. In the book's afterword, Roberts states that the crew of the ship are Allie's descendants.

== Critical reception ==
Reviewing Purgatory Mount in Locus, Paul Di Filippo wrote that Roberts is "one of the field’s most delightfully surprising, adept, and formalistically variant authors", and "[a]ll these trademark traits of his fiction come to the fore" in this book. Di Filippo said that while for much of the book there appears to be no connection between the two "widely and wildly disjunct parts", in the end "all is crystal clear, with consequential powerful impacts by resonance". He added that the final section aboard the Forward is "rife with revolution and symbolical affinities" with the near-future United States. Di Filippo concluded that by writing about "a concrete and recognizable near-term scenario and bracketing it with more Olympian moments, Roberts achieves a kind of Stapledonian perspective which places humanity’s sufferings and dreams in a larger context that finally gives them some sense and heft."

In another review of the book in Locus, science fiction critic Gary K. Wolfe described Purgatory Mount as a "strange, bumpy [and] compelling hybrid novel" that raises questions about "ethics, responsibility, and ... revenge". He said the near-future United States timeline reads like a "Cory Doctorow hacker dystopia", and the book's three sections resemble the Divine Comedy's three parts, Inferno, Purgatorio and Paradiso. Wolfe remarked that while Roberts does explain how the book's two scenarios are connected, the mystery of the alien structure is left unsolved and "become[s] a metaphor".

In a review in the British Science Fiction Association journal, The BSFA Review, Duncan Lawie described Purgatory Mount as "a rather peculiar novel", but added that this would not surprise readers familiar with Roberts' previous works. Lawie remarked that while the book's single line that connects the two timelines with "almost no cognisance of Otty’s world" may disappoint some, the author's afterword "delivers a reward for the reader who has climbed to the top of Purgatory Mount." Writing in SF Crowsnest Gareth D Jones found no obvious connection between the book's two scenarios. He said Roberts "has stitched them together subtly and seamlessly", but felt that it did not "smack one in the face." Jones stated that Purgatory Mount could be read as two books, "a novelette split in half with a novella sandwiched between them". Speculative fiction author Lisa Tuttle wrote in The Guardian that Roberts' explanation in the book's afterword left her "unconvinced". She said "what an author says he meant is not always borne out by the text".
