= Crimson Skies =

Tabletop and video game franchise

- Created by: Jordan Weisman; Dave McCoy
- Original work: Crimson Skies (1998)
- Owner: Xbox Game Studios (Microsoft Gaming)

Print publications
- Book(s): List

Games
- Traditional: Board game (1998); Miniatures game (2003)
- Video game(s): Crimson Skies (2000); High Road to Revenge (2003)

Crimson Skies is a tabletop and a video game media franchise created by Jordan Weisman and Dave McCoy, first released as a board game in 1998 and then as a PC game in 2000.

The series' intellectual property is currently owned by Microsoft Corporation through its Xbox Game Studios division. Weisman's former company, Smith & Tinker Inc., had announced in 2007 that it had licensed the electronic entertainment rights to the franchise, but no new titles were developed. The Crimson Skies trademark was renewed in 2013 by Microsoft for video games, although the trademark for other related media has been abandoned.

The series is set within an alternate history of the 1930s invented by Weisman and McCoy. Within this divergent timeline, the United States has collapsed, and air travel has become the most popular mode of transportation in North America; as a result, air pirates thrive in the world of Crimson Skies. In describing the concept of Crimson Skies, Jordan Weisman stated he wanted to "take the idea of 16th century Caribbean piracy and translate into a 1930s American setting".

Crimson Skies was first conceived as a PC game known as Corsairs!, but was released first as a board game from FASA. The franchise has since expanded to include a collectible miniatures game from Wizkids, a miniature wargame from Ral Partha, as well as a series of books. The series also includes two arcade flight-based video games published by Microsoft Game Studios – Crimson Skies for the PC and Crimson Skies: High Road to Revenge for the Xbox. Both games were well received by critics, though only the second was commercially successful.

Crimson Skies is an example of the dieselpunk genre, though it predated the genre name.

== Development history ==
According to series creator Jordan Weisman, the original idea for Crimson Skies came after he had completed research on the early years of aviation; the era and historical characters inspired him to create a game about the period. For their game, Weisman and Dave McCoy settled on a post WWI European setting revolving around the "knights of the air". However, a game with a similar idea came out then; Weisman and McCoy subsequently moved the setting to the U.S. and changed the concept to placing air pirates in a modern setting. From there, they crafted an alternate history to simulate the conditions that gave rise to piracy in the Caribbean in a 1930s setting. Weisman later said about the development of the universe:

Whenever I create different universes—MechWarrior, Shadowrun, Crimson Skies—to me, it's all about looking at 'What are the fantasies that excited us when we were 5?' And if we can find a new and more sophisticated way to tap into that fantasy [...] Crimson Skies is just combining two classic male fantasies: You get to be a pirate; you get to be a pilot.

Work on Crimson Skies began under the name Corsairs!. Development started for Virtual World Entertainment, and was later moved to a PC game when Virtual World merged with FASA Corporation. Although the Corsairs! project was shelved, Weisman and a group of FASA employees worked outside of business hours to create the Crimson Skies board game. According to Weisman: "The board game was borne purely out of the fact that I needed to get this universe out of our heads and into the world, and it was the best venue to do so quickly". Developer John Howard has stated that the board game was built to "showcase the Crimson Skies property, with an eye towards expanding on it in other ways".

When FASA Interactive became a part of Microsoft, Weisman and his team were able to start a new game, and work on the PC version of Crimson Skies began; the game was developed by Zipper Interactive. The game utilizes arcade flight mechanics, focusing on action, as opposed to a realistic portrayal of the physics of flight. The game's relaxed physics as well as its focus on barnstorming led GameSpot to comment that "Crimson Skies is very much based on a 'movie reality' where if it's fun and looks good, it works".

The Xbox game Crimson Skies: High Road to Revenge was later developed as a first-party title for Microsoft Game Studios by FASA Studio. Like the previous game, arcade flight elements were incorporated in order to focus gameplay on action instead of flight mechanics. Early in the game's production, developers decided upon a "playable movie" concept, but found that gameplay would be restricted by this approach. Consequently, the game's release date was pushed back by approximately one year to allow the development team time to retool the game. The results of this extra development period include more open-ended gameplay features and Xbox Live support.

After development concluded on High Road to Revenge, the developers moved to work on another Crimson Skies title for Microsoft; development, however, was cancelled shortly into the project. When FASA Studio was later shut down, Microsoft retained the video game rights to Crimson Skies, although it had no immediate plans for the IP. Weisman's latest company, Smith & Tinker, later "licensed from Microsoft the electronic entertainment rights" to Crimson Skies. Although the company has made no formal announcement as to its plans with the franchise, Weisman has assured fans that there will be a new entry in the series.

== Universe ==
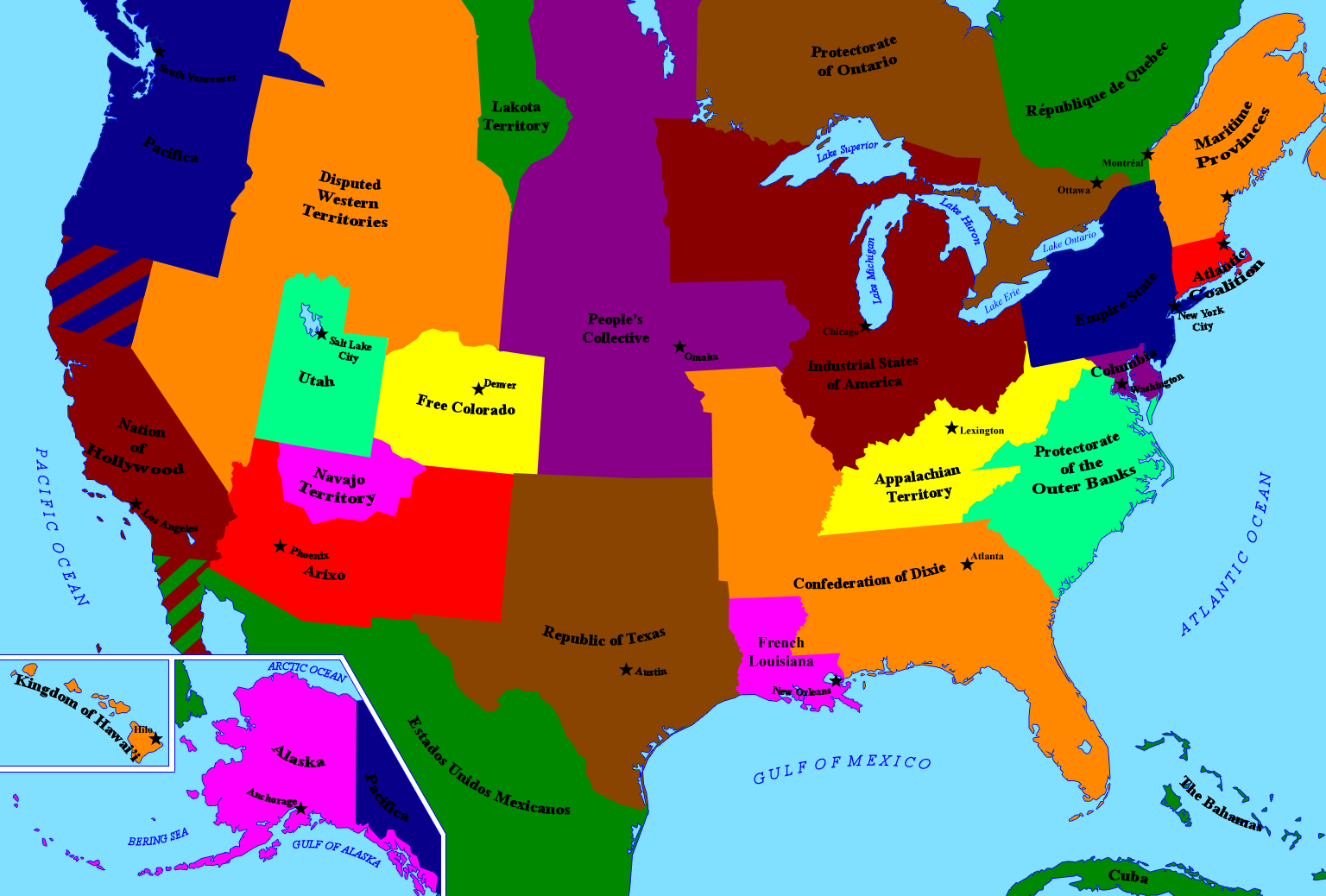
Map of North America in the Crimson Skies universe. In Crimson Skies, the U.S. and Canada have broken-up into a number of smaller polities.

=== Backstory ===
The Crimson Skies series takes place in an alternate 1930s in which the U.S. has broken apart into a number of independent nation states. According to series creator Jordan Weisman:

I needed to create a geo-political situation that would result in air-pirates, so I looked at the real political situation that gave rise to the pirates of the Caribbean in the 16th and 17th centuries. We needed a balkanized era so that pirates could escape quickly into another country's territory, we needed things of value to be moved by air, and we needed a constantly churning political environment so that things did not settle down quickly. [...] It took only three little changes in the history of the United States to get us the dynamic world of Crimson Skies.

This alternate timeline incorporates both fictional and actual historic events. According to the series' official backstory, the divergent timeline begins after World War I, when a "Regionalist movement" gains popularity in America following the Spanish influenza pandemic, rallying behind an isolationist platform. Meanwhile, President Wilson's authority was undercut when Prohibition failed as a constitutional amendment leaving the matter to be decided on the state level. The nation soon became polarized between "wet" and "dry" states and checkpoints became a common sight on state borders to stop the flow of alcohol into "dry" states. As the decade progressed, state governments seized more authority, encroaching into areas formerly the responsibility of the federal government, and formed regional power blocs.

The optimism of the Roaring Twenties was upset in 1927 when an outbreak of a deadly strain of influenza in America prompted states to close their borders, further dividing the Union. Though not as deadly as the 1918 pandemic, the epidemic had immense political fallout, bolstering regionalist "strong state" views and decreasing voter turnout in the 1928 election. Shortly after the Wall Street crash of 1929, Texas seceded from the United States, reforming the Republic of Texas on January 1, 1930. New York was the next state to secede, and persuaded Pennsylvania and New Jersey to merge with it to form the Empire State. California followed suit, creating the Nation of Hollywood, as did Utah, which had already come in conflict with the federal government after the establishment of the Smith Law in 1928 that made Mormonism the state religion. Washington, D.C., essentially powerless, was unable to stop the country from falling apart. The federal government made its last stand against the "People's Revolt" of the bread basket states. When the US Army was defeated by the People's Collective (formerly the Midwest) forces in 1931, the fate of the United States was sealed, and the rest of the country dissolved into independent nations by the end of 1932 with the last legal remnant of the US being the neutral nation of Columbia in what used to be whatever area around Washington could be seized.

Though not directly affected by the Texas Secession, Canada found itself dragged down by the collapse of the U.S., with Quebec seceding in 1930 and the rest of the provinces siding with their nascent southern neighbors: New Brunswick and parts of Quebec joined the Maritime Provinces of Maine, New Hampshire, and Vermont; Newfoundland joined Quebec; Manitoba joined the People's Collective as did parts of Saskatchewan, with the Lakota nation laying claim to the rest; British Columbia merged with Oregon and Washington in the Pacific Northwest; and Alaska claimed the Yukon territories. The core of the former Canadian government established the Protectorate of Ontario. While Ottawa's authority technically extends to Alberta and the Northwest Territories, these areas are mostly no-man's land, while Nova Scotia and Prince Edward Island comprise a self-governing body, commonly referred to as the Northumberland Association.

In 1931, the Territorial Government of Hawaii was left defenseless in the wake of the fragmenting country and was overthrown in favor of reestablishing the Hawaiian monarchy with Jonah Kūhiō as its king. Likewise, America's territorial holdings overseas were surrendered following the nation's formal collapse and the formation of the Federal Republic of Columbia on March 1, 1932.

The resulting nation states that formed were no longer unified—distrust between them strained diplomatic relations to the point that several small-scale wars broke out.

After the dissolution of the United States, the country's interstate railroad and highway systems fell into disrepair or were sabotaged as they crossed hostile borders. Consequently, ground-based vehicles such as the locomotive and automobile were replaced by aircraft such as the airplane and the zeppelin as the leading mode of transportation in North America. Europe soon followed this fascination with aviation to make its own strides into the new, aerially-dominated market. Gangs of air pirates formed in turn to plunder airborne commerce. Although air militias formed to counter the threat, rivalries between the nations of North America reduced their capacity to effectively address this issue, and even encouraged the countries to sponsor pirates as privateers so as to direct their illegal operations against opposing nations. In Europe, privateers and other mercenary groups were widely adopted by nations who wished to avoid another world war, especially in the case of the Spanish Civil War.

By the end of 1937, North America was a "hotbed of conflict", with multiple pirate gangs and air militias battling for control of the skies. Europe was no better, as Germany jockeyed for power while France and Britain looked the other way. The Russian States continued to fight their civil war, which threatened to spill over into the Eastern European nations and Alaska. Asia, too, was on the brink, with Japan's recent invasion of China and the continuation of the bloody civil war in Australia.

=== Aircraft and technology ===
The planes of Crimson Skies are fictional designs created to fit within the Crimson Skies universe. Although some planes were modeled after actual 1930s era experimental aircraft and other "bizarre and outlandish designs" from the early years of aviation, they still take significant departures from conventional aviation design. Jordan Weisman has stated that the planes in Crimson Skies are designed to be the "hot rods of the air". According to IGN, "the planes in CS are built for style and not function with their redundant wing positions and rear propellers". For example, the Devastator aircraft features a pusher propeller and a biplane design.

Because of the history of the world of Crimson Skies, especially given that the nation states of North America are constantly at war with one another and that air travel is the primary means of transportation, advancements in both aircraft and weaponry technology would have proceeded at a faster pace than had actually happened in the same time period. Zeppelins with hangar launch bays that can accommodate escort fighters are featured prominently in Crimson Skies; in actuality, only a few zeppelin-based airborne aircraft carriers saw service. Zeppelins in Crimson Skies are also armed with broadside cannons and are also heavily armored. Radio-controlled rockets are also available in the Crimson Skies universe, which can be controlled remotely after launch.

Other technologies are exclusive to the world of Crimson Skies. Magnetic rockets have the ability to track planes or weapon emplacements over a short distance. Aerial torpedoes are similar to sea-based torpedoes, but are specifically designed to take out airships. Beeper/seeker rockets are designed to work in tandem. The "beeper" rocket attaches to a target and emits a homing signal; the "seeker" rocket follows the homing signal, destroying the target. The Choker rocket disables the target's engine by bursting into a fireball that burns all oxygen around it. The Tesla cannon is a tesla coil-style weapon that fires a bolt of electricity at a target, disabling it. Also featured in Crimson Skies is the wind turbine, a weather control mechanism designed to generate storms.

== Games ==
=== FASA board game ===
The Crimson Skies board game was released by FASA in 1998. The base game came with card stock, assemble-yourself airplanes included, but later metal miniature planes were offered separately. While the focus was on fantasy over fact, many of the planes in Crimson Skies were modeled after real experimental aircraft of the era.

The complex universe of Crimson Skies earned many devoted fans, as dozens of different weapons, planes, nations, air forces, bands of pirates, and characters were all given detailed pasts, and several additional supplemental campaigns were published.

=== Microsoft PC game ===
The PC game Crimson Skies was developed by Zipper Interactive and released in 2000. The game's storyline is framed around a radio drama that chronicles the adventures of Nathan Zachary and the Fortune Hunters pirate gang during their rise to fame and fortune. Gameplay centers on the control of one of the game's playable aircraft, which the player can customize with different parts to alter performance. The game's flight mechanics were designed to be a compromise between realistic and arcade flight.

One of Crimson Skies' unique gameplay features was the inclusion of "danger zones"—challenging areas through which the player can fly for various effects. The game's focus on barnstorming and relaxed flight physics led GameSpot to comment that "Crimson Skies is very much based on a 'movie reality' where if it's fun and looks good, it works". However, the game's original release was plagued with numerous technical problems, most notably the unreliability of the player's saved game files. Though a patch was released to remedy this issue, the game still retains many technical issues such as long loading times and sluggish menu screens.

=== Crimson Skies: High Road to Revenge ===
Crimson Skies: High Road to Revenge is an Xbox game developed by FASA Studio and released in 2003. The game centers on Nathan Zachary and the Fortune Hunters, in their crusade to avenge the death of a close friend, Dr. Fassenbiender, at the hands of the Die Spinne organization. Developers decided early on in the game's production cycle that the game would not simply be a port of the PC title, and by the end of the development cycle, many of the story elements that linked the game to the PC game had been excised.

Although the game is similar to the PC game in that gameplay centers on controlling an aircraft, a new feature is the ability for the player to switch aircraft or man fixed weapon emplacements during a mission. The game's mission structure also features a number of other open-ended elements that have led to comparisons with the sandbox gameplay of the Grand Theft Auto games. The game additionally boasted a number of online gameplay modes over Xbox Live.

=== WizKids collectible miniatures game ===
In 2003, Wizkids released the Crimson Skies collectible miniatures game. The game utilizes collectible figures featuring both planes and pilots from the Crimson Skies universe. These miniatures use WizKids' Clix system, by which a character's or plane's statistics and abilities can be altered during gameplay by way of an adjustable dial located on the base of the figure.

The Crimson Skies miniatures game comprises two separate games, each with its own set of rules. The gameplay in Crimson Skies: Aces revolves around pilots battling each other on the ground, while the gameplay in Crimson Skies: Air Action focuses on dogfighting between squadrons of aircraft. Figures were sold in "squadron packs" and "ace packs", which were formatted in blisterpacks as opposed to the random packaging format used in other Wizkids games.

== Books ==
In addition to the tabletop and video games, the Crimson Skies series also features a number of tie-in books and short stories.

Spicy Air Tales was published by FASA in 1999. The two-volume series featured short stories that originally appeared on the Crimson Skies website and supplemental material for using characters and planes from the stories with the boardgame.

- Volume I
- Fortune's Hunt, by Michael A. Stackpole
- Volume II
- The Great Helium War, by Robert E. Vardeman
- Manhattan Mayhem, by Loren L. Coleman

Wings of Fortune: Pirate's Gold, by Stephen Kenson, was published by FASA in November 2000. It introduced Nathan Zachary and his famous band of air pirates, the Fortune Hunters. It follows Zachary's air exploits and daring escapes during his early days as a war pilot, and recounts a climactic confrontation with his nemesis.

Wings of Justice: Rogue Flyer, by Loren L. Coleman, was published by FASA in December 2000. It follows the transformation of Trevor Girard from a law-abiding security agent to a pirate with a heart of gold.

Crimson Skies was published by Del Rey in October 2002 to promote the future release of the Xbox game. It features three novellas, two originally published on the Crimson Skies website, one previously unpublished. Each story is preceded by a brief history lesson about the Crimson Skies universe that acts as the prelude to the following story.

- The Case of the Phantom Prototype, by Eric Nylund – Paladin Blake must fly a top-secret aircraft into the Mojave Desert.
- "The Manchurian Gambit, by Michael B. Lee – Jonathan "Genghis" Kahn, the leader of the Red Skull Legion pirate gang, rescues a lady in distress and fights air battles from Manhattan to Manchuria with, surprisingly, no plunder in sight.
- Bayou Blues, by Nancy Berman and Eric S. Trautmann – Nathan Zachary and his "Fortune Hunters" square off against a Cajun sky-thief, a crooked businessman, and a pair of star-crossed lovers in a high-stakes, high-altitude con game.

== See also ==
- Crimson: Steam Pirates, a mobile game developed by Weisman owned studio bearing stylistic and plot similarities to the Crimson Skies universe.
- Sky Captain and the World of Tomorrow, a film that bears stylistic and plot similarities to the Crimson Skies universe.
- Dark Void, a spiritual successor developed by former FASA Studio members.
