= The Va Dinci Cod =

Book by Adam Roberts

The Va Dinci Cod: A Fishy Parody
- First edition (publ. Gollancz)
- Author: Adam Roberts
- Language: English
- Publication date: 2005
- Publication place: United Kingdom

The Va Dinci Cod: A Fishy Parody is a parody of the New York Times Bestseller The Da Vinci Code. It was written by British critic and novelist Adam Roberts under the pen name Don Brine (a parody of Dan Brown). The character names in the novels are reminiscent of the well-known characters: Sophie Nudivue (Sophie Neveu), Robert Donglan (Robert Langdon), and Curvy Tash (Bezu Fache). It was published in 2005 by HarperCollins.

== Story ==
The story of The Va Dinci Cod is much the same as that of The Da Vinci Code. The difference is that the characters are searching for a cod instead of the Holy Grail. While the events in both books are similar, The Va Dinci Cod parodies the events in The Da Vinci Code.

== See also ==
- The Asti Spumante Code – Another parody of The Da Vinci Code
