= The Snow (novel) =

2004 novel by Adam Roberts

- First edition
- Author: Adam Roberts
- Language: English
- Genre: Science fiction novel
- Publisher: Gollancz
- Publication date: March 2004
- Publication place: United Kingdom
- Media type: Print (Hardback & Paperback)
- Pages: 304
- ISBN: 0-575-07181-8
- OCLC: 59263877

The Snow, published in 2004, is a science fiction novel by British writer Adam Roberts. It is set in the present day and, latterly, the near future. It concerns the appearance of a heavy, prolonged fall of snow, which eventually blankets the earth in a layer of snow literally miles thick.

It was Roberts' fifth novel in five years.

== Plot summary ==
The heroine of the story, Tira, is an Indian Londoner who initially survives the snowfall by staying on the surface of the snow. Once the snow begins to bury even the highest buildings, she meets a worker from the London Underground and they both survive by sheltering in a high-rise office building and living off supplies that they have cached and can forage for. The worker later dies after falling off a chair and breaking his leg. Tira lives on her own for an unspecified period before being rescued by "snow miners" from the New United States of America (referred to as NUSA). The miners are looking for currency to use in NUSA, and have mistaken her location of "Bank" as being an actual bank. They take her to a floating city called 'Liberty', which rests atop the snow, buoyed up by large hydrogen balloons. There she chooses an arranged marriage with a former military man, now a politician, and it is suggested he will be the next President of NUSA. (The General is not named – all instances of his name are censored as the text is implied to be part of an official history.) Tira chooses him on the recommendation of "Pander", one of the generals sycophantic aides. Tira never knows Pander's real name, only referring to him by nickname as he effectively sells Tira to the general and panders to the General's every whim. To Tira's surprise, the relationship initially works, and although she does not love the General, he accepts this and she lives in relative luxury and comfort, Tira considering the General a fair trade to any alternative.

While in Liberty Tira meets a repentant terrorist whose final attempt at terrorism - to kill the general by way of an exploding microphone - ironically ensured his survival as it meant he was stranded in the army base when the snow arrived, and thus the balloon city that became Liberty. She begins an affair with the terrorist, but is captured by the city police and taken to an internment camp in the depths of the snow. Pander arrives to identify her, but her inability to correctly name him coupled with her skin having returned to a darker brown from her pallid complexion after months under the snow means he leaves her in the prison. There she has several encounters with an alien race who, it is suggested, caused the snow and move through it as their natural medium.

Eventually the General hears of her imprisonment and visits her personally, recognising and releasing her. During her time in the camp vast stores of food and fish have been located by the food miners - the food in warehouses deep under the snow, but still viable, and the fish in thermally heated pools, or artificially created lakes near power stations that are melting nearby snow due to unmaintained atomic pile.
