= Land of the Headless =

2007 novel by Adam Roberts

- First edition
- Author: Adam Roberts
- Language: English
- Genre: Science fiction
- Publisher: Orion Books (Gollancz)
- Publication date: 2007
- Publication place: United Kingdom
- Media type: Print
- Pages: 288
- ISBN: 0-575-07799-9

Land of the Headless is a science fiction novel by the British writer Adam Roberts, published in 2007.

== Plot summary ==
The story focuses upon the experiences of Jon Cavala, a poet on the religiously fundamentalist planet of Pluse. He is beheaded for the crime of rape, although this is subsequently revealed to be simply consensual sexual intercourse outside of marriage that the authorities have deemed 'rape'. This being a future civilisation, beheading does not kill Cavala. Instead his 'brain' or, it is hinted, his mind state is placed inside a computer-like device called an 'Ordinator.' He sees and hears via robotic prostheses but cannot smell or taste.

After his decapitation he is released into a world that regards the headless as the lowest of the low. A headed volunteer charity worker named Siuzan Delage helps Cavala adjust to his new state. She agrees to accompany him on a trek across a desert to a town more accepting of the headless. Cavala and Delage are joined on this trek by two other headless, Mark Pol and Gymnaste. Gymnaste is a timid soul but Mark Pol is immediately annoying and arrogant from the point of view of Cavala. Arriving at their destination, Delage disappears and the three headless are immediately arrested and questioned, as there is evidence that Delage has been raped. All three vehemently deny this, though Cavala suspects Mark Pol of raping Delage. Through a fight and the obvious hatred of the police inspector, Cavala finds himself enlisted in the army. Before he leaves the police station he is told that it is likely Delage herself will be beheaded as she will not name the perpetrator of her rape and thus will be convicted of 'rape' (this being consensual sex outside of marriage).

The army possess devices that trigger extreme pain in the headless through their ordinator and Cavala and his contemporaries soon learn discipline. They are sent to a world named Black Athena and go into combat in the Sugar War. Many months later, returning to Pluse from Black Athena, Cavala finds a menial job and searches for Delage to atone for her beheading. He succeeds in tracking her down (she is indeed headless) and they fall in love. They plan to move to a nearby town with many more headless living there. The night before they are due to move, Cavala runs into Mark Pol, who he has long suspected of raping Delage (Delage is still unforthcoming regarding this event). Cavala threatens to kill Mark Pol, who re-iterates that Cavala cannot trust himself as he is a 'rapist' and it is probably Cavala himself who raped Delage. Cavala leaves Mark Pol, thinking that indeed it might be possible. However, he runs into Delage and she has her head. It transpires that his betrothed headless Delage has been pretending to be the real Delage but has genuinely fallen in love with him anyway. They eventually run into the police inspector again, who reveals he was attempting to pin Deluge's rape on Cavala. He believed Cavala deserved to be killed for his original crime and had expected him to take the blame for this crime to prevent the real Susan Delage losing her head by beheading. In the inspectors mind Cavala ruined everything by not taking the blame as he planned and he states that he thought he had some decency. After arguing with the Police Inspector about this and his past crime, Cavala and the headless Delage run away to a remote location and, it is hinted, start planning a headless uprising against the uncaring society that has decapitated them.

== Reception ==
Lisa Tuttle in her review for The Times said that "the Land of the Headless is a darkly satirical tale that extrapolates an absurd idea into something weirdly plausible. This is not escapist adventure but a dystopian vision in the tradition of Swift, Orwell and Atwood against the cruelest extremes of human stupidity."
