= The Soddit =

Tolkien parody

- First edition
- Author: A.R.R.R. Roberts
- Language: English
- Genre: Parody
- Publisher: Victor Gollancz
- Publication date: 2003
- Publication place: United Kingdom
- Media type: Print
- Pages: 343 pp
- ISBN: 978-0-575-07591-7
- OCLC: 59265544

The Soddit or Let's Cash in Again is a 2003 parody of J.R.R. Tolkien's 1937 novel The Hobbit, written by A.R.R.R. Roberts. The book jacket states: "Following on (inevitably, some might say) from the frankly unlikely success of Bored of the Rings comes a new book from an entirely different author that parodys [sic] Tolkien's other (and undoubtedly shorter) masterpiece."

The book consists of primarily slapstick-style jokes, with characters of slightly different names from the original ones (for example, Bingo as opposed to Bilbo) and a slightly altered main storyline. As the book progresses, the story departs further and further from the original storyline that it parodies. It is illustrated in 'Glorius Mono-colour' (again as stated on the book jacket) by Douglas Carrel.

== Plot summary ==
The story starts with a peaceful Soddit called Bingo who is visited by a wizard, Gandef, and a party of dwarfs led by Thorri and Mori who ask Bingo to come with them on a quest to "the Only Mountain" where "Smug the Dragon" lives. After a few drinks, Bingo accepts, not knowing what they were actually searching for. "Gold, boyo gold, la, look you."

On the way, they have many adventures and close shaves, including their ponies drowning in the river and losing all luggage but one helmet. Roberts says he wanted the company fighting through the Piccadilly flea circus and fighting the Daleks from Doctor Who, but he says it was cut for time. They have a nasty run in with some trollops, who plan to eat them, successfully squash four dwarfs, but they annoy the wizard Gandef, who temporarily turns them to mounds of sand as opposed to real stone. While at the tree village of Riverdale, Ellesquare and the other Tree Elves of the high council ridicule the dwarfs for their loss of their four comrades and call it "carelessness." The company entered the mountains after Gandef struggled to open the door until he coughed, which was apparently the password. In the mountains, they encounter Gobblins, which are evil turkeys, who take them to their town, but the dwarves all fight out, Gandef repeatedly decapitates countless Gobblins while in combat, a fifth dwarf dies in friendly fire from Gandef and Bingo gets lost by falling down the abyss. He falls into a cavern, where he meets a morose philosopher named Sollum. He challenges him to a game of riddles; with the cannibalistic philosopher seeing Bingo's presence as the only delightful moment in his life. Bingo wins the riddles, and asks what he wins, but then remembers he found a Thing® that was created by evil dark lord Sharon and is Sollum's. So the philosopher tries to eat him, but he escapes due to the Thing®'s super-speed.

After reuniting with the party, the dwarfs are chased by non-sentient wolves and hide up a tree, though not before a sixth dwarf is eaten. The wolves flee after Gandef sets them on fire, allowing the company to simply climb down the tree and walk away. Gandef plans to take them to a mill, which is "famous" but when they arrive they find it has been accidentally burned by the wolves. Then they go to see a fearsome ABBA-quoting maniac, Biorn the bear-man, who is reputed to change from man to bear at night, but later during the visit they find he is just a totally crazy, naked man who thinks he can transform. They shut him outside his house to calm him down, and then they move on leaving him to mumble. The next bit is the "enchanted" forest of Myurkywood, which has been under an illusion spell for some time. As in the original, the streams are magic, and turn to rapids quick. They meet highly bitter, political spiders in the forest who want to lay eggs in their beards, but Bingo realizes the Thing® can get them out of their peril, which it does. It works by reversed spells, but a seventh Dwarf dies from using it to heal his ankles. Then, they find a brewery, where the men are morbidly obese Dwarfs and drunk and want to drown them because they can't sing. After unintentionally using the Thing® to obtain drunken immunity, Bingo gets them out.

They get to Lakeside, where they go off to the Only Mountain, where Bingo asks if the dwarves are going to finally tell him why he's there. Upon hearing that he has to go down a chimney, Bingo is accidentally thrown down said chimney when Mori promises to tell him the truth, and meets the dragon Smug, who is actually very friendly and even offers him tea. Smug says he hasn't made any enemies and doesn't know of anyone who would kill him. He is worried he has driven away the Lakesiders' business, so he says he'll fly over to talk. But the dwarves are angry and tell Bingo that Gandef was a dwarf, he has changed into a wizard, and he'll now change into a dragon because that's nature and that's where dragons come from. Smug is shot dead at Lakeside by Lard the Bowman, and twenty thousand gobblins led by the Great Gobblin attack, but the six remaining dwarves led by Mori, five hundred men led by Lard, five hundred elves led by Ellesquare, and Bingo, led by himself, fight them. At the end, most of the men and elves are massacred, three more Dwarfs die, Mori is severely injured and the gobblins swarm round them demanding the Thing®, but Bingo tricks them by giving them the Barking Stone, which they believe is the Thing® and whispers in it "war", which causes Gandef's dragon breath to erupt from the Only Mountain's chimney and kill all the gobblins, which encircles the remaining soldiers of the other four armies. After the Battle of the Five Armies has ended, Mori dies in Bingo's arms, which finishes off in a style of a Looney Tunes ending and thus only two dwarfs of the company have survived the quest. Gandef is confirmed and revealed to be a dragon, who can't remember that he wiped out the gobblin army and saved the survivors single-handedly, before flying Bingo home.

== Standard edition ==
343 pages, miniature edition. Published by Victor Gollancz, ISBN 0-575-07554-6.

The story was also produced in Abridged Audiobook form by Orion Audio Books. The product contains three CDs, runs for 4 hours, and is read by Mark Perry, ISBN 0-7528-6165-4.

== Parodies ==
In 'The Soddit' there is a small message claiming that it is not "The first few minutes of a prologue of "A MAJOR NINE-HOUR EPIC!!!". Also, at the end, it has various fake books being advertised, including 'The Spuddit' which is a parody of 'The Soddit' where the parts are taken by potatoes. However, this is a joke and there is no such book (as yet).

== Reception ==
Steven H. Silver delivered a favourable review of the book in 2004. He observed that Roberts used Tolkien's own "excesses which readily give themselves to parody". According to Silver, The Soddit had not simply become a joke, but is a full novel with deep characters and new parts in the plot.
