= MechAssault 2: Lone Wolf =

2004 video game

- Developers: Day 1 Studios; FASA Studio
- Publisher: Microsoft Game Studios
- Producer: T. J. Wagner
- Designers: David Fifield; Brad Delaney; Jeffrey Gregg; Corey E. Navage; Matt Udvari
- Programmer: Michael Springer
- Composers: Dario Cozzi; Michael Cozzi
- Series: BattleTech
- Platform: Xbox
- Release: NA: December 28, 2004; JP: January 20, 2005; PAL: February 4, 2005
- Genre: Third-person shooter
- Modes: Single-player, multiplayer

MechAssault 2: Lone Wolf is a 2004 video game developed by Day 1 Studios and FASA Studio and published by Microsoft Game Studios exclusively for the Xbox console, and set in the BattleTech universe. Development of MechAssault 2 was announced shortly following the release of MechAssault, with the developers focusing on the expansion of online and networking features to capitalise upon the success of the original game as a pilot title for the Xbox Live online service, and creating a more open-ended gameplay style in which players are able to exit their mech and occupy multiple vehicles.

== Plot ==
After many searches, Major Natalia "Nat" Kerensky decides to base their testing operations in Dante City on the Planet Dante, using the blackmarketeers as a cover. One evening, as Foster and the MechWarrior (player) are returning to their workshop, mysterious craft enter the Dante airspace and a Stiletto BattleMech lands on the ground and starts searching for them. They successfully evade the Stiletto and make it back to the workshop, where Nat instructs the player use a new powered armor suit called the BattleArmor to stop the invaders. After this, hundreds of dropships enter Dante's atmosphere. Mysteriously, one of these dropships is shot down by the others. After fighting to the crash site, a strange new MechWarrior by the name of Alera emerges, a space pirate with a jumpship named the "Jezebel". Later, the MechWarrior escapes an enemy port, and steals an enemy tank from 3 soldiers in an attempt to infiltrate the enemy. An allied APC then comes out and follows the MechWarrior on his way. The tank must go through two scans to advance the level, but the "Passenger Scan" warns the enemies that it is a trick, and the MechWarrior and his allies must escape the port with a tank.

After several confrontations with the enemy, it is discovered that the aggressors seek to access the Lostech blueprints and prototypes stored in the data cores to create an unstoppable army of mechanised soldiers to obtain dominance over the Inner Sphere, starting with mass-producing the Ragnarok Prototype model that discovered in the first game.

During the final mission, the MechWarrior with the aid of his allies uses the BattleArmor to destroy a half-complete giant BattleMech that uses all five of the data cores.

== Gameplay ==
The player controls a variety of vehicles other than mechs. These vehicles include tanks, powered armor, turrets, and VTOLs. The player can also leave their vehicle and plant explosives or roam as a human pilot and in this form can "hitch" rides on enemy and friendly vehicles. When on an enemy vehicle, the player can attempt a "neurohack", with the result of ejecting the pilot and taking over his vehicle if successful.

== Development ==
MechAssault 2 was created by Chicago and Hunt Valley independent developer Day 1 Studios, who published MechAssault as a launch title for the Xbox Live online service in late 2002. Following the commercial success of MechAssault, Day 1 Studios signed an agreement with Microsoft Game Studios to release a follow-up exclusive Xbox release, with the sequel announced in February 2004 for release in late 2004. Studio President Denny Thorley stated securing an exclusive release led the developers to focus on optimising the game for the Xbox, as they had not been certain whether the original game would be ported to other platforms. MechAssault 2 was created with an "totally reworked and distributed" engine, allowing the developers to introduce graphical enhancements to specularity and bump mapping not present in the original game. The developers aimed to strike a balance in the design of MechAssault 2, intending to "stick as closely as possible to the pick up and play style of the original", whilst "introducing a few new twists" to the single-player and multiplayer modes. The unexpected success of the original game's online features on Xbox Live heavily informed the development approach for the sequel, with the studio noticing that players would play together and form teams during matches, even though online play was not a complex feature of the original game. To capitalise on the large multiplayer community, the developers worked on expanded multiplayer tools, such as clans, emotes, and match lobbies, and developing a "much more tactical element" to the multiplayer game modes. Release of MechAssault 2 was delayed to late December 2004 to avoid competition with Halo 2, which released in November of that year.

== Reception ==
Reception

Aggregate score
Aggregator	Score
Metacritic	81/100

Review scores
Publication	Score
Edge	6/10
Electronic Gaming Monthly	8/10 (Note: Three critics of Electronic Gaming Monthly gave the game each a score of 8/10.)
Eurogamer	6/10
Famitsu	29/40
Game Informer	9.25/10
GamePro	4/5
GameRevolution	B
GameSpot	7.9/10
GameSpy	4.5/5
GameZone	9.2/10
IGN	8.9/10
Official Xbox Magazine (US)	8.4/10
Detroit Free Press	3/4
The Times	4/5

The game received "favorable" reviews according to the review aggregation website Metacritic. GameSpot cited good visual effects, and overall good gameplay, specifically praising the multiplayer portion of the game, but also citing several drawbacks including repetitiveness in the single-player campaign, along with poor voice acting and "uninspired terrain graphics". IGN also cited good gameplay, especially the multiplayer portion of the game. Concerns included the lacking appeal of the singleplayer campaign, and bad environmental graphics. In Japan, where the game was ported for release on January 20, 2005, Famitsu gave it a score of one seven, one eight, and two sevens for a total of 29 out of 40.

The Times gave it a score of four stars out of five, saying, "Experienced gamers will have a blast in cyberspace, battling with other players from around the world, which pretty much justifies the cost of broadband on its own." Detroit Free Press gave it three stars out of four, calling it "A screaming, cursing, testosterone-soaked attack on your eyeballs and ears." However, The Sydney Morning Herald gave it three-and-a-half stars out of five, saying, "There are sufficient missions but little choice of objectives, ensuring the action starts to feel prematurely repetitive."
