= MechAssault =

2002 video game

- Developers: Day 1 Studios; FASA Studio
- Publisher: Microsoft Game Studios
- Producer: Michael J. McDonald
- Designer: Tom Dowd
- Artists: Timothy Zwica; Tim Coman
- Series: BattleTech
- Platform: Xbox
- Release: NA: November 12, 2002; PAL: November 22, 2002
- Genre: Action / Shooter
- Modes: Single player, multiplayer

MechAssault is a 2002 video game released for the Xbox. Developed by Day 1 Studios and FASA Studio and published by Microsoft, MechAssault was initiated when Denny Thorley of Day 1 Studios approached Jon Kimmich of Microsoft about developing an original BattleTech game built from the ground up to support console play. notable for being one of the first games to support Xbox Live online multiplayer. A sequel, MechAssault 2: Lone Wolf, was released on December 28, 2004. Both games are set in the BattleTech fictional universe.

== Plot ==
MechAssault takes place in the BattleTech universe, a science-fiction universe that often revolves around pitched battles between human-piloted walking, heavily armed and armored machines, called BattleMechs. The plot of the game centers on an inhabited planet called Helios in the dominion of the Inner Sphere, a powerful coalition of feuding factions in control of large areas of space. The player is a BattleMech pilot (referred to throughout the game as simply "Captain" or, "MechWarrior") in the employment of an elite mercenary organization called Wolf's Dragoons. The player's ship is hired to investigate the cessation of communications from the planet Helios. The Dragoons' ship, the Icarus arrives at the planet and is shot down upon entering the atmosphere, causing the ship to crash-land on the surface of Helios. It is later discovered by the player that a rogue technology-worshipping cult known as the Word of Blake has invaded and conquered Helios, and is under the rule of an iron-fisted fanatic called Commander Strader. The game follows the player as, commanded by elite officer Major Natalia and assisted by inept techie Lieutenant Foster, they fight the military forces of the cult, assist in the liberation of the planet from Word of Blake rule, and assassinate Commander Strader.

== Multiplayer ==
MechAssault was one of the first games on the Xbox to feature the ability to be played on the Xbox Live service. "MechAssault" included many of the basic Live services that are now considered standard on any Live-enabled video game. These features included options for finding and creating online matches, such as the common "Quick Match", which enables a player to find an online match quickly regardless of qualifications. For players who wanted to join a specific type of online session of MechAssault hosted by another player, "Optimatch" allowed the player to specify the criteria for the session they want to join. The player could also create and host an online session of MechAssault. Once the player defined all the characteristics of a game, they could invite other players from their friends list or leave slots open for any online player to join the battle. Online modes were available via Xbox Live until April 15, 2010. Mechassault is now playable online again on the replacement Xbox Live servers called Insignia.

MechAssault had several modes of combat in which players could engage, often based around by-now-common forms of online competitive gaming. In Grinder mode (local play only), the player tries to survive as more and more 'Mechs are spawned into the battle. This mode can be played with one or two players. In Destruction mode, the player can choose a 'Mech and fight to the death in deathmatch or team deathmatch. The player or team with the most kills wins. Last Man Standing is a free-for-all with no respawning as a mech. Once a player dies, they respawn as an unarmed infantryman. Gameplay can be either deathmatch or team deathmatch. Capture the flag is a team based game where the opposing team spawn on opposite ends of the map and try to "Capture" the enemy flag without giving up their own.

A fairly common metagame during the height of online popularity was known as "Elemental". A Last Man Standing match, "Elemental" saw only one player choose a Mech while all others chose the Elemental mobile armor, a much smaller and weaker playable class. This was decided by players in voice chat prior to the start of the game. It was later released as an official game type known as "Giant Killers".

== Reception ==
Reception

Aggregate score
Aggregator	Score
Metacritic	87/100

Review scores
Publication	Score
AllGame	4/5
Edge	(XBL) 5/10; 4/10
Electronic Gaming Monthly	8.5/10 (Note: Three critics of Electronic Gaming Monthly gave the game each a score of 9/10, 8/10, and 8.5/10.)
EP Daily	8.5/10
Eurogamer	9/10
Famitsu	28/40
Game Informer	8.75/10
GameRevolution	B+
GameSpot	9/10
GameSpy	4/5
GameZone	9.6/10
IGN	9.2/10
Official Xbox Magazine (US)	9.3/10
X-Play	4/5
Entertainment Weekly	B+
Maxim	5/5

The game received "generally favorable reviews" according to the review aggregation website Metacritic. Jeff Gerstmann of GameSpot said, "If you're going to buy one game with your Xbox Live starter kit, MechAssault is the one to get." In Japan, where the game was ported for release on June 12, 2003, Famitsu gave it a score of all four sevens for a total of 28 out of 40. GamePro called it "a blitzkrieg of metal-mauling combat and strategy, purely for stick jockeys. It's no sim, but it's not simple either." (Note: GamePro gave the game 5/5 for graphics, two 4.5/5 scores for sound and fun factor, and 4/5 for control.)

GameSpot named it the best Xbox game of November 2002, and later presented it with the annual awards for "Best Online Game on Xbox", "Best Shooter on Xbox", and overall "Game of the Year on Xbox". It was a runner-up in the publication's "Best Sound" and "Best Graphics (Technical)" categories. The game won the awards for "Best Online Xbox Game" and "Best Online Console Game" at The Electric Playground's 2002 Blister Awards, and was nominated for "Best Graphics in a Console Game", "Best Console Shooter" and "Xbox Game of the Year", but lost to Tom Clancy's Splinter Cell (Graphics, Xbox Game of the Year) and Metroid Prime, respectively.

By July 2006, the game had sold 750,000 units and earned $26 million in the U.S. NextGen ranked it as the 85th highest-selling game launched for the PlayStation 2, Xbox or GameCube between October 2000 and July 2006 in that country. Combined sales of the MechAssault series reached 1.1 million units.
