= David Louis Edelman =

American novelist and web programmer

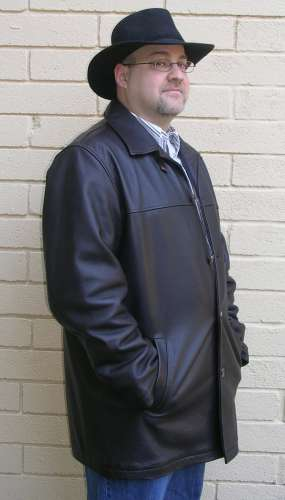
- David Louis Edelman
- Born: February 25, 1971 (age 55); Birmingham, Alabama, U.S.
- Occupations: Novelist and Web Designer
- Writing career
- Genre: Science fiction
- Website: www.davidlouisedelman.com

David Louis Edelman is an American novelist and web programmer. He is best known for his Jump 225 trilogy, which has earned him nominations for the John W. Campbell Memorial Award for Best Science Fiction Novel and John W. Campbell Award for Best New Writer.

== Early life ==
He was raised in Orange County, California and graduated from Villa Park High School in 1989. He majored in Writing Seminars at Johns Hopkins University, where he graduated in 1993.

== Career ==
Over the years, Edelman's programming work has included websites for the U.S. Army and the FBI and teaching software for the U.S. Congress and the World Bank. His work in the dot-com boom of the 1990s influenced his first novel Infoquake.

=== Jump 225 trilogy ===
His first book, Infoquake (2006), was nominated for the John W. Campbell Memorial Award for Best Science Fiction Novel and named Barnes & Noble's Top SF Novel of 2006. In 2008, his second year of eligibility, he was nominated for the John W. Campbell Award for Best New Writer.

His second novel in the series, MultiReal, was released in July 2008. io9, Gawker Media's SF blog, listed MultiReal as one of its top ten books of 2009.

The concluding novel of the Jump 225 trilogy, Geosynchron, was released in February 2010.

== Bibliography ==
=== Jump 225 trilogy ===
- Infoquake (2006)
- MultiReal (2008)
- Geosynchron (2010)
