= Salt (Roberts novel) =

2000 novel by Adam Roberts

- First edition
- Author: Adam Roberts
- Language: English
- Genre: Science fiction
- Publisher: Gollancz
- Publication date: 20 June 2000
- Publication place: United Kingdom
- Media type: Print
- Pages: 248
- ISBN: 0-575-06896-5
- OCLC: 50198947
- Dewey Decimal: 823/.92 21
- LC Class: PR6118.O23 S25 2001

Salt is a novel by British science fiction author Adam Roberts.

== Plot ==
Two communities of settlers from Earth set out for the planet of Salt, but once on the planet, which has minimal natural resources, the two colonies – the Senaar and the Als – descend into war over old tensions. The events of the novel are alternately narrated by Barlei, a military dictator beholden to the Senaar's strict hierarchy, and Petja, an Alsist who grows to resist the Senaar military campaign.

== Critical reception ==
Reviewing the novel for Infinity Plus, Stuart Carter writes, "Doris Lessing and Iain Banks collaborate to rewrite The Dispossessed, and do a better job of it than anyone might reasonably hope! OK, so it's not exactly a blockbuster by-line but, please, trust me on this one—Salt is a moving, intelligent and great book." He adds that Petja and Barlei

"recount both sides of their arrival and descent into war in alternating passages. It's a classic device and Salt shows why it's still a popular one. There's a beautiful and simultaneously frustrating dichotomy between the two of them. Both narrators are consumed with themselves: one because he sees all people as individuals and therefore inherently important, the other because he is Leader of his people and therefore inherently important. Barlei's sections are the more interesting to read because of the quite breathtaking doublespeak he employs—George Orwell would have been proud. On the flipside, Petja's sections are interesting in their own right but lack the outrageous black humour of Barlei's."

Greg L. Johnson, at SF Site, writes:

"It's an age-old story of fear, arrogance and misunderstanding leading to a war that is all too human and personal in its causes and consequences. By focusing on two individuals instead of their larger societies, Roberts keeps the story focused on the realization that it is individual choices that lie at the root of great events, a point that can get lost when the story is allowed to take on a more epic sweep. Roberts presents each character's views and decisions so even-handedly, that in the end it seems fitting that neither Petja nor Barlei get the final word; that honour goes to the only character in the book who has met them both.

Salt, both in its ambition and execution, invites comparison to other SF novels of high stature. The Dispossessed has already been mentioned as a philosophical precedent. In addition, the almost lifeless salt desert recalls that other desert planet, Arrakis. And in its theme of humans carrying their sins with them wherever they go, Salt brings to mind Frederik Pohl's masterpiece of pessimism, Jem.

Let there be no doubt, however, that Salt is a novel that succeeds on its own terms. Roberts' prose carries the weight of a serious theme, but never becomes bombastic or portentous itself. This is the work of a writer who has already found his voice, and has something meaningful to say."

John C. Snider, reviewing for SciFiDimensions, writes, "It's not just that these two parties don't see eye-to-eye—it's that their cultures are so alien to one another they don't know how to see eye-to-eye. The story of Salt is told, Rashomon-like, through dueling oral histories. ... The reader is forced to interpret these opposing viewpoints, to piece together the 'real' truth if he or she can. And like 'real' life, the reader will find that there are no easy answers and no neat endings."

== Awards and nominations ==
- Shortlisted for the 2001 Arthur C. Clarke Award.

== See also ==
- Gradisil
