= Pulp fiction =

Pulp fiction or Pulp Fiction may refer to:

== Arts and entertainment ==
=== Publishing ===
- Pulp magazine, a paperback novel or pulp magazine, cheaply produced, typically made of wood pulp paper
  - Pulp fiction (genre), sensational fiction of varying length presented in that magazine format
    - Lesbian pulp fiction, paperback novels or pulp magazines
    - Gay pulp fiction, paperback novels or pulp magazines

=== Film ===
- Pulp Fiction, 1994, directed by Quentin Tarantino
  - Pulp Fiction (soundtrack), the soundtrack album from the film

=== Music ===
- Pulp Fiction, a single of Finnish poprock band Haloo Helsinki
- Pulp Fiction, a single by UK drum and bass producer Alex Reece

=== Other arts ===
- Pulp Fiction (Banksy), a series of related works by the stencil graffiti artist Banksy
