= Gradisil =

2006 novel by Adam Roberts

- First edition
- Author: Adam Roberts
- Cover artist: Sonar
- Language: English
- Genre: Science fiction novel
- Publisher: Gollancz
- Publication date: 16 March 2006
- Publication place: United Kingdom
- Media type: Print
- Pages: 464
- ISBN: 0-575-07631-3
- OCLC: 62760985

Gradisil is a science fiction novel by British author Adam Roberts.

== Plot summary ==
Gradisil takes place over several generations of the Gyeroffy family, the novel's timeline spanning from 2059 to the first half of the 22nd century, circa 2130. On these generations hang the novel's basic plots – a murder story, a domestic story, a political story and a revenge story. The first involves Klara Gyeroffy and her father, an aeronautics hobbyist, in their establishment of the low Earth orbit settlement of the Uplands. With the advent of more efficient propulsion technology, space travel reaches a new level of attainability, the Uplands phenomenon being a product of direct access, for those wealthy enough, to the lower orbits. The Uplands has no legal or taxation systems, civic obligations, boundaries, politics or treaties.

In 2059 Klara's father Miklós flies Kristin Janzen Kooistra, a tenant who requires a hideaway, for their Upland lodging. Kooistra kills him during docking, it being later revealed that she is a serial killer at large. Klara, orphaned, flees to Jon, a neighbour in Canada, in distress. The pair soon remove Upland and organise a more permanent residence there, with other billionaire eccentrics of the neighbourhood.

The next portion of Gradisil is largely an exposition of the environment's domestic capacity, Roberts investigating the challenges and novelties of day-to-day Upland life, the question of zero-g as hindrance and boon, and ever-present logistics issues. Jon and Klara become sexual partners, but she soon tires of him and develops a relationship with Teruo Nakagomi, a shrewd businessman. After falling pregnant by him, Klara returns to Earth to deliver her child. Her daughter, Gradisil, is born in 2063.

Gradisil is about Earthbound conflict as well as Upland conflict. United States-EU tensions of the previous century have become critical, with war finally erupting in 2065. Politically, the Uplands is still a non-entity and the pioneers remaining proudly aloof to "Downland" politics. Klara remains on Earth, supporting Gradisil.

In 2081 the first seizure of "EU houses" by the US takes place in the Uplands. The orbit settlement is now transformed into both a political and military battlefield, with the US anti-Upland and EU pro-Upland, and receives increasing coverage by Earth media over the coming years. Klara is appointed EU envoy to the Uplands in 2075. Two new narrators are introduced: Lieutenant Slater of the United States Upland Corps, providing insights into the exigencies and metamorphoses of that nation's military-industrial complex in the late 21st century; and Paul Caunes, Gradisil's second husband, who would later betray her to US authorities.

As the Uplands comes into its own as the first extraterrestrial country in human history, Gradisil consolidates her role of political activism and de facto media ambassador. Many Uplanders later address her as "President" during her household visits. She is embarked on a campaign to awaken in the rudimentary nation "matriotism"—a unique nationalism for a unique entity—which aims to preserve a default peacetime anarchy. In 2091 and 2093 Gradisil's sons, Hope and Solidarity respectively, are born, however Paul Caunes is the biological father of neither.

2099 sees the onset of the US-Upland war. Every logistical aspect of the war has been meticulously designed by the US to fulfil a new legal bureaucratic order (for instance, the war must officially conclude before the turn of the century and take no longer than 72 hours in all), Slater contending that the real war takes place in the courts. Gradisil and her young nation lie under siege for months, their supply lines cut off by USUC forces. All the while she has turned pregnant with her first child to Paul. Knowing that she cannot return to Earth without being captured, she sacrifices the foetus in orbit.

Gradisil waits for the opportune moment to launch a kamikaze attack on USUC orbital stations. It proves effective, and shatters the image of US unassailability that the European loss of the "war of '81" cemented. There occurs a realisation, both Down- and Upland, that the United States can never exercise any meaningful control over the territory. Upon embarking on the victory rounds, Gradisil and her retinue are soon led into a trap, she falling into US custody.

The novel leaps forward twenty years, to focus on an adult Hope, on business excursion to the Uplands, trying to secure an investment for a mining project on Mercury. However, his brother Sol is also at the hotel complex at which he's lodged, on an assassination mission, the target being Paul Caunes. Hope has a run-in with an undercover American agent, under the assumption that Hope conspires with his brother. Sol kills him, shortly secures his father and escapes with him and Hope. On board the escape ship, a kangaroo court is held in what turns out to be a makeshift Upland town hall. Caunes is sent into the vacuum to die, after telling his sons that he is "sorry".

== See also ==
- Salt
