= Wargaming Chicago-Baltimore =

American video game developer

Wargaming West Corporation
- Formerly: Meyer/Glass Interactive, L.L.C. (1997–2001); Day 1 Studios, LLC (2001–2013)
- Type: Privately held company
- Industry: Video games
- Founded: February 6, 1997; 29 years ago
- Headquarters: Chicago, Illinois, U.S.
- Number of employees: ~160
- Parent: Wargaming (2013–present)

Wargaming Chicago-Baltimore (formerly Meyer/Glass Interactive, L.L.C., Day 1 Studios, LLC and Wargaming West Corporation) is an American game developer that operates in Chicago, Illinois and Hunt Valley, Maryland.

== History ==
They worked in tandem with developer FASA Interactive to create their first two games: MechAssault, which Microsoft used to promote their Xbox Live service, and MechAssault 2: Lone Wolf. They worked with Monolith Productions to make the Xbox 360 and PlayStation 3 console ports of F.E.A.R..

In 2006, they signed a deal with LucasArts to develop the science fiction video game Fracture. It had mixed reviews from the gaming press. In 2010, Warner Bros. Interactive Entertainment announced that they would be developing the third instalment in the F.E.A.R. franchise entitled F.E.A.R. 3, first announced using the title F.3.A.R., which was later confirmed as just for advertising. When their subsequent project with Konami was canceled, however, around 100 employees (the vast majority of the team working on that project) were laid off. The remaining team members moved forward with development on the free-to-play mech game Reign of Thunder.

On January 29, 2013, it was announced that Wargaming, the creator of World of Tanks, acquired Day 1 Studios for $20 million and rebranded it Wargaming West. The acquisition included the rights to Reign of Thunder, with it since having been put aside, and subsequently canceled.

== Games developed ==
As Meyer/Glass Interactive

Year	Title	Platform(s)	
Year	Title	Win	PlayStation
1998	Axis & Allies	Yes	No
1999	Axis & Allies: Iron Blitz	Yes	No
1999	Avalon Hill's Diplomacy	Yes	No
1999	Missile Command	Yes	Yes
2000	Battleship: Surface Thunder	Yes	No

As Day 1 Studios

Logo of Day 1 Studios before its acquisition by Wargaming

Year	Title	Platform(s)			
Year	Title	PS3	Win	Xbox	X360
2002	MechAssault	No	No	Yes	No
2004	MechAssault 2: Lone Wolf	No	No	Yes	No
2006	F.E.A.R.	Yes	No	No	Yes
2008	Fracture	Yes	No	No	Yes
2011	F.E.A.R. 3	Yes	Yes	No	Yes

As Wargaming Chicago-Baltimore

Year	Title	Platform(s)			
Year	Title	X360	XB1	PS4	Win
2014	World of Tanks	Yes	Yes	Yes	Yes

=== Canceled video games ===
- Batman: Gotham by Gaslight
- TR2N: Liberation
- Reign of Thunder
- F.E.A.R. 2
