= FASA Studio =

American video game developer

- Formerly: FASA Interactive Technologies Inc. (1994–2002)
- Type: Subsidiary
- Industry: Video games
- Founded: 1994; 32 years ago in Chicago, Illinois
- Founder: Jordan Weisman
- Defunct: September 12, 2007; 19 years ago
- Headquarters: Redmond, Washington, U.S.
- Parent: Microsoft (1999–2000); Microsoft Game Studios (2000–2007)

FASA Studio (formerly FASA Interactive Technologies Inc.) was an American video game developer that was founded in 1994 in Chicago, Illinois by the tabletop game company FASA Corporation. FASA is an acronym for "Freedonian Aeronautics and Space Administration".

== History ==
FASA Interactive Technologies was formed in 1994 by FASA Corp. founders Jordan Weisman and L. Ross Babcock to create video games based on its BattleTech, MechWarrior, and Shadowrun intellectual properties. After its formation, it took over development of the MechWarrior series.

Microsoft acquired FASA Interactive in 1999, changing its name to FASA Studio. Now under the Microsoft Game Studios banner, it developed games exclusively for Windows and Xbox. Weisman was named creative director of Microsoft's entertainment division and the company's 60 developers were relocated to Microsoft's main campus in Redmond, Washington.

Following the acquisition, FASA released MechWarrior 4 in 2000 and MechCommander 2 in 2001. It also produced two MechAssault titles. Weisman left Microsoft in 2002.

FASA's final release was the online multiplayer shooter Shadowrun, based on the popular role-playing game. It ultimately sold poorly on Xbox 360 and PC after its May 2007 release. On September 12, the company announced it was officially being shut down. Only a Community Manager and Technical Support Manager retained their positions in order to support its games. Many of the studio's employees were transferred to other companies under Microsoft Game Studios. Microsoft retained the video game licenses for Crimson Skies, MechAssault, and Shadowrun.

Microsoft subsequently licensed the rights to produce electronic adaptations of FASA games back to Weisman, who directed a venture called Smith & Tinker. Smith & Tinker closed down November 8, 2012.

== Games developed ==
| Year | Title | Platform | Note(s) |
|---|---|---|---|
| 1998 | MechCommander | Windows | Published by MicroProse and Hasbro Interactive |
| 2000 | MechWarrior 4: Vengeance | Windows | |
| 2001 | MechWarrior 4: Black Knight | Windows | Co-developed with Cyberlore Studios |
| 2001 | MechCommander 2 | Windows | |
| 2002 | MechWarrior 4: Mercenaries | Windows | Co-developed with Cyberlore Studios |
| 2002 | MechAssault | Xbox | Co-developed with Day 1 Studios |
| 2003 | Crimson Skies: High Road to Revenge | Xbox | |
| 2004 | MechAssault 2: Lone Wolf | Xbox | Co-developed with Day 1 Studios |
| 2007 | Shadowrun | Windows, Xbox 360 | |
| Cancelled | Untitled Shadowrun game | | |
| Cancelled | MechWarrior Prime | | |
| Cancelled | Mechwarrior 5 | PC, Xbox | |
| Cancelled | Crimson Skies 3 | PC, Xbox 360 | |
