= Adam Roberts (British writer) =

British writer (born 1965)

Adam Roberts FRSL
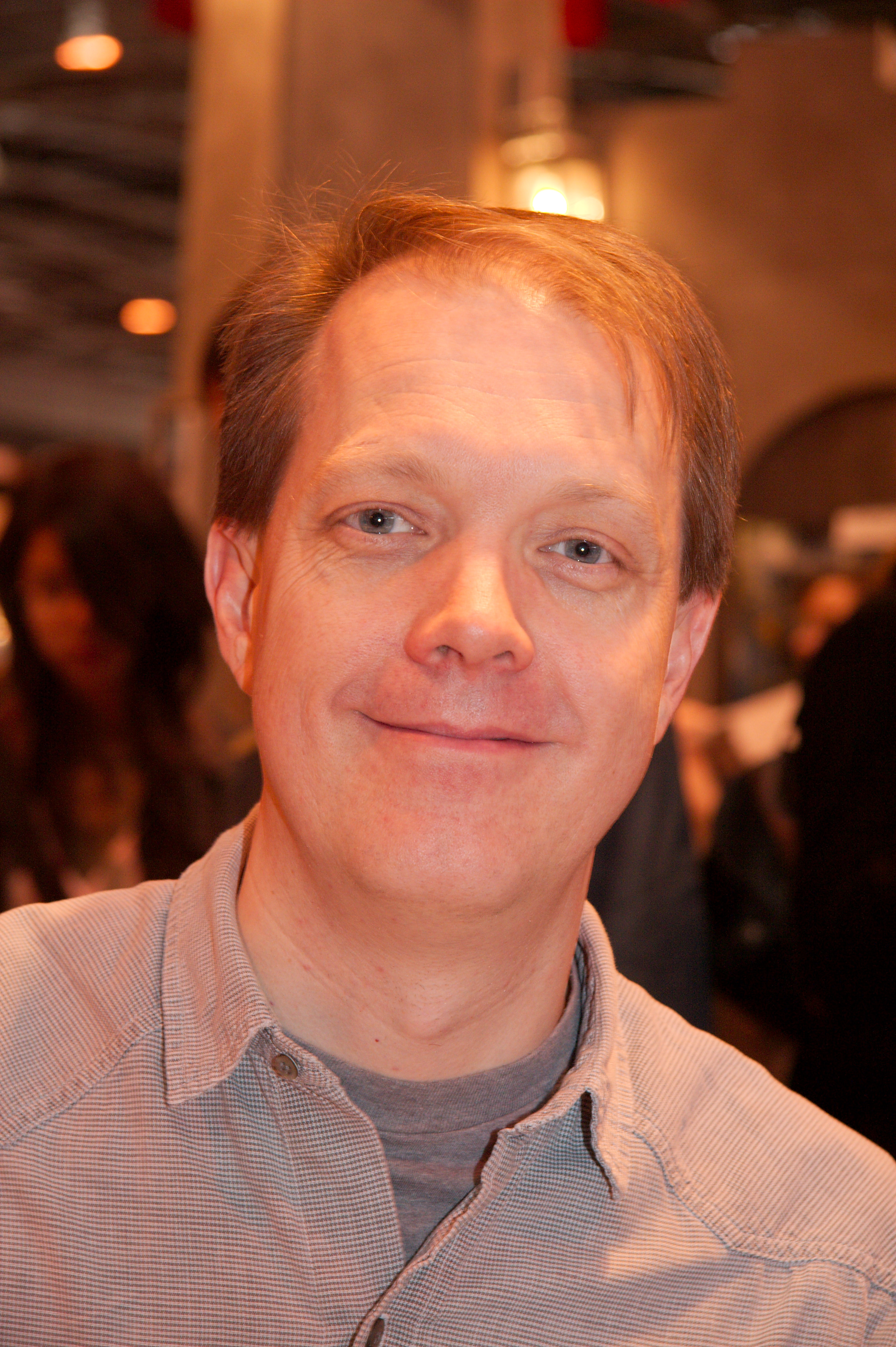
- Roberts at Salon du livre 2008 (Paris, France)
- Born: Adam Roberts; 30 June 1965 (age 61); London, United Kingdom
- Citizenship: British
- Education: PhD
- Alma mater: University of Aberdeen; Cambridge University
- Occupations: Academic, critic, writer
- Writing career
- Pen name: A.R.R.R. Roberts; A3R Roberts; Don Brine
- Genres: Science fiction, fantasy, parody
- Notable works: Salt, Gradisil, Yellow Blue Tibia, By Light Alone, Jack Glass
- Notable awards: BSFA Award for Best Novel; 2012 Jack Glass; Arthur C. Clarke Award nominee 2001 Salt; 2007 Gradisil; 2010 Yellow Blue Tibia

Adam Charles Roberts FRSL (born 30 June 1965) is a British science fiction and fantasy novelist. In 2018 he was elected vice-president of the H. G. Wells Society.

== Career ==
Born in London, Roberts has a degree in English from the University of Aberdeen and a Ph.D. from Cambridge University on Robert Browning and the Classics. He teaches English literature and creative writing at Royal Holloway, University of London.

Adam Roberts has been nominated three times for the Arthur C. Clarke Award: in 2001 for his debut novel, Salt, in 2007 for Gradisil and in 2010 for Yellow Blue Tibia. He won both the 2012 BSFA Award for Best Novel, and the John W. Campbell Memorial Award, for Jack Glass. It was further shortlisted for The Kitschies Red Tentacle award. His short story "Tollund" was nominated for the 2014 Sidewise Award. On his website, Roberts states that an ongoing project of his is to write a short story in every science fiction sub-genre.

In May 2014, Roberts gave the second annual Tolkien Lecture at Pembroke College, Oxford, speaking on the topic of women in The Lord of the Rings. He was elected a Fellow of the Royal Society of Literature in 2018.

== Published works ==
=== Novels ===
- Salt (2000, ISBN 0-575-06896-5)
- On (2001, ISBN 0-575-07176-1)
- Stone (2002, ISBN 0-575-07396-9)
- Polystom (2003, ISBN 0-575-07541-4)
- The Snow (2004)
- Gradisil (2006)
- Land of the Headless (2007)
- Splinter (2007)
- Swiftly: A Novel (2008)
- Yellow Blue Tibia: A Novel (2009, ISBN 0-575-08356-5)
- New Model Army (2010)
- By Light Alone (2011)
- Jack Glass (2012, ISBN 0-575-12763-5)
- Twenty Trillion Leagues Under the Sea (2014)
- Bête (2014, ISBN 978-0-575-12768-5)
- The Thing Itself (2015)
- The Real-Town Murders (2017)
- By the Pricking of Her Thumb (2018)
- Haven (2018)
- The Black Prince (2018)
- Purgatory Mount (2021)
- The This (2022)
- The Death of Sir Martin Malprelate (2023)
- Lake of Darkness (2024)
- Frankenstein Rex (2026, ISBN 978-1-399-61775-8)

=== Novellas ===
- Park Polar (2002)
- Jupiter Magnified (2003)
- Anticopernicus (2011)
- Bethany (2016)
- The Lake Boy (2018)
- The Man Who Would Be Kling (2019)
- The Compelled (2020)
- Stealing for the Sky (2022)
- The Midas Rain (2023)
- High (2024)
- The Swoon (2024)

=== Short stories and short story collections ===
- "S-Bomb" in Riffing on Strings: Creative Writing Inspired by String Theory (2008, ISBN 0-9802114-0-9)
- "Trademark Bugs: A Legal History", Reach for Infinity (2014)
- Swiftly: Stories (2004)
- Adam Robots (2013)
- Saint Rebor (2015)
- "The Martian Waste Land", Scarlet Traces (2019)
- "Chrononavirus", Cwej: Springs Eternal (2026)

=== Parodies ===
- The Soddit (2003, The Hobbit)
- The McAtrix Derided (2004, The Matrix)
- The Sellamillion (2004, The Silmarillion)
- Star Warped (2005, Star Wars)
- The Va Dinci Cod (2005, The Da Vinci Code)
- Doctor Whom: E.T. Shoots and Leaves (2006, Doctor Who)
- I am Scrooge: A Zombie Story for Christmas (2009, Charles Dickens, A Christmas Carol).
- The Dragon with the Girl Tattoo (2010, The Girl with the Dragon Tattoo)
- I, Soddit: The Autobiography (2013, The Hobbit)

=== Criticism ===
- Silk and Potatoes: Contemporary Arthurian Fantasy (1998)
- Science Fiction (The New Critical Idiom) (2000, second edition 2005)
- Fredric Jameson (2000)
- Tolkien: A Look Behind The Lord of the Rings (original version by Lin Carter) (Roberts updated the text for the 2003 edition)
- The History of Science Fiction (Palgrave Histories of Literature) (2006, second edition 2016)
- The Riddles of The Hobbit (Palgrave Macmillan) (2013)
- Sibilant Fricative: Essays and Reviews (2014)
- Rave and Let Die: The SF and Fantasy of 2014 (2015) (Won the BSFA Award for Best Non-Fiction.)
- H G Wells: A Literary Life (2019)
- It's the End of the World: But What Are We Really Afraid Of (2020) (Won the BSFA Award for Best Non-Fiction.)
- Roberts, Adam (2025). Fantasy: a short history. London New York Oxford: Bloomsbury Publishing. ISBN 978-1-350-40785-5.

=== Poetry ===
- Wodwo Vergil (2018)

=== Other non-fiction ===
- Get Started in: Writing Science Fiction and Fantasy (2014, ISBN 978-1-4447-9565-3)
