= List of BattleTech games =

The BattleTech franchise has many authorized titles in various genres, including tabletop wargames, role-playing games and collectible card games, as well as video games on multiple platforms.

== Board games ==
Title	Catalog	Year	Publisher
Alpha Strike	CAT35690	2019	Catalyst Game Labs
BattleTech: Aces	CAT35490	2025	Catalyst Game Labs
BattleDroids	1604	1984	FASA
BattleTech, Second Edition	1604	1985	FASA
BattleTech, Third Edition	1604	1992	FASA
BattleTech, Fourth Edition	1604	1996	FASA
Classic BattleMech: Introductory Box Set	3500	2007	Catalyst Game Labs
BattleMech: 25th Anniversary Introductory Box Set	3500A	2011	Catalyst Game Labs
BattleMech: Introductory Box Set	3500B	2013	Catalyst Game Labs
BattleTech: Beginner Box	CAT35020	2019	Catalyst Game Labs
BattleTech: A Game of Armored Combat	CAT3500D	2019	Catalyst Game Labs
BattleForce	1611	1987	FASA
BattleForce 2	1703	1998	FASA
The Succession Wars	1612	1987	FASA
BattleTroops	1637	1989	FASA
BattleSpace	1680	1993	FASA

== Roleplaying games ==
Title	Catalog	Year	Publisher
MechWarrior	1607	1986	FASA
MechWarrior, Second Edition	1641	1991	FASA
MechWarrior, Third Edition	1715	1999	FASA
Classic Battletech RPG	35030	2006	FanPro
BattleTech: A Time of War	35005	2009	Catalyst Game Labs
MechWarrior: Destiny	35185	2020	Catalyst Game Labs

== Card games ==
Title	Year	Publisher
BattleTech Collectible Card Game	1996	Wizards of the Coast

== Video games ==
Title	Year	Developer	Platforms
BattleTech: The Crescent Hawk's Inception	1988	Westwood Studios	MS-DOS, Amiga, C64, Apple II, Atari ST
MechWarrior	1989	Dynamix	MS-DOS, Mac, X68000
BattleTech: The Crescent Hawk's Revenge	1990	Westwood Studios	MS-DOS
MechWarrior	1993	Beam Software	SNES
BattleTech: A Game of Armored Combat	1994	Extreme Entertainment Group	SNES, Genesis
MechWarrior 3050	1995	Tiburon Entertainment	SNES, Genesis
MechWarrior 2: 31st Century Combat	1995	Activision	MS-DOS, Windows, Mac, Saturn, PlayStation
MechWarrior 2: Ghost Bear's Legacy	1995	Activision	MS-DOS, Windows, Mac
MechWarrior 2: Mercenaries	1996	Activision	MS-DOS, Windows, Mac
MechCommander	1998	FASA Interactive	Windows
MechCommander: Desperate Measures	1999	FASA Interactive	Windows
MechWarrior 3	1999	Zipper Interactive	Windows
MechWarrior 3: Pirate's Moon	1999	Zipper Interactive	Windows
MechWarrior 4: Vengeance	2000	FASA Interactive	Windows
MechWarrior 4: Black Knight	2001	Cyberlore Studios	Windows
MechCommander 2	2001	FASA Interactive	Windows
MechWarrior 4: Mercenaries	2002	Cyberlore Studios	Windows
MechAssault	2002	Day 1 Studios	Xbox
MechAssault 2: Lone Wolf	2004	Day 1 Studios	Xbox
MechAssault: Phantom War	2006	Backbone Entertainment	Nintendo DS
MechWarrior: Tactical Command	2012	Personae Studios	iOS
MechWarrior Online	2013	Piranha Games	Windows
BattleTech	2018	Harebrained Schemes	Windows, OSX, Linux
MechWarrior 5: Mercenaries	2019	Piranha Games	Windows, PlayStation 4/5, Xbox
MechWarrior 5: Clans	2024	Piranha Games	Windows, PlayStation 5, Xbox

=== Multiplayer online games ===
Asterisks denote titles not officially sanctioned or associated with the franchise.

Title	Year	Developer / Publisher	Platforms
BattleTech 3025 (Later 3026)*	1991-	Volunteers	MUSE
BattleTech 3056*	1993-	Volunteers	MUSE
BattleTech 3030*	1994-	Volunteers	MUSE (Later incarnation changed to TinyMUX code after the success of the spinoff game Varxsis)
BattleTech: The Frontier Lands*			
Inner Sphere 3028*			MUX
Invasion3042*	2006-2014	Volunteers	Windows
MechWarrior: Living Legends*	Open beta in 2009	Volunteers / Wandering Samurai Studios	Windows
MegaMek*	2002	Volunteers	Linux, Macintosh, Windows
The Shack, MekWars Campaign*	2007	Volunteers	Windows, Macintosh
Multiplayer BattleTech: EGA*	1992–1996	Kesmai	
Multiplayer BattleTech: Solaris*	1996–2002	Kesmai	
Multiplayer BattleTech 3025	2001	Kesmai / EA Games	Windows
Neveron	2000(?)-	Volunteers	Windows
MechWarrior Online	2013	Piranha Games / Infinite Game Publishing	Windows
MechWarrior Tactics		Roadhouse Interactive / Infinite Game Publishing	Unity

=== Arcade video games and simulators ===
Title	Year	Manufacturer	Platform
BattleTech VR	1990	Virtual World Entertainment	Tesla
BattleTech: Firestorm		Virtual World Entertainment	Tesla II
MechWarrior 4	2002	Tsunami Visual Technologies	TsuMo

=== Collectible Miniature Games ===
Title	Year	Publisher
MechWarrior: Dark Age	2002	WizKids
