= 1987 in games =

This page lists board and card games, wargames, miniatures games, and tabletop role-playing games published in 1987. For video games, see 1987 in video gaming.

== Games released or invented in 1987 ==
- Ars Magica (role-playing game)
- Auf Achse
- BattleForce
- Block Mania
- Central America
- Chainsaw Warrior
- Chaos Marauders
- Cyborg Commando
- Federation and Empire
- The Fury of Dracula
- Gammarauders
- Guillotine
- Illuminati: Deluxe Edition
- Living Steel (role-playing game)
- Rogue Trooper
- Star Wars: The Roleplaying Game (West End Games version)
- The Succession Wars
- Take Off!
- Talislanta (role-playing game)
- Tantrix
- Teenagers from Outer Space (role-playing game)
- TimeLords (role-playing game)
- Traveller: 2300 (role-playing game)
- Warhammer 40,000

== Game awards given in 1987 ==
- Spiel des Jahres: Auf Achse - Wolfgang Kramer, F.X. Schmid

== Deaths ==
Date	Name	Age	Notability
September	Ephraim Hertzano	75	Designer of Rummikub

== See also ==
- 1987 in video gaming
