= Living Legend =

Living Legend(s) may refer to:

== Film and television ==
- "The Living Legend", a 1978 episode of Battlestar Galactica
- "Living Legend" (CSI), a 2006 episode of CSI: Crime Scene Investigation
- Living Legend (audio drama), an audio drama based on Doctor Who
- Living Legends (film), a 2014 Bulgarian film

== Music ==
- Living Legends (group), an American hip hop group
- Living Legends (BYU), a performing arts group at Brigham Young University

Albums

- Living Legend (Art Pepper album), 1975
- Living Legend (Gunplay album), 2015
- Living Legend: Certified D-Boy, by Master P, 2005
- A Living Legend, by Mother Maybelle Carter, 1965
- Living Legends (album), by 8Ball & MJG, 2004
- Living Legend, by Bo Diddley, 1989
- Living Legend, by Roland Rat
- Living Legend, by Seikima-II, 1999

== Nicknames ==
- Bruno Sammartino (1935-2018), Italian professional wrestler
- Larry Zbyszko (born 1951), American professional wrestler

== Other uses ==
- Living Legend (attraction), a former tourist attraction on the Island of Jersey (British Isles)
- Living Legends (charity), an Australian facility for retired race horses
- Library of Congress Living Legend, an award for creative contributions to American life
- Living Legend (nursing) an American nursing award
- Living legend (person), a person who is famous while still living for doing something extremely well
- MechWarrior: Living Legends, a BattleTech video game mod
- Living Legends (MechWarrior), a 1995 adventure for the role-playing game MechWarrior
- The Nickname of Union Pacific 844
