= Guillotine (disambiguation) =

A guillotine is a device for carrying out executions by decapitation named after French Politician Joseph-Ignace Guillotin who initially proposed its usage as a more humane form of execution.

Guillotine or Guillotines may also refer to:

== Cutting ==
- Guillotine, a type of cigar cutter
- Guillotine amputation, performed without closure of the skin in an urgent setting – typically followed by a 2nd-phase amputation
- Guillotine cutting, the process of partitioning a material by bisecting it
- Guillotine (metalwork) or shear
- Paper cutter or paper guillotine

== Film ==
- Guillotine (film), a 1924 German silent drama film
- Guillotine Guys, a 2010 American film
- The Guillotines, a 2012 Chinese film

== Music ==
- "The Guillotine", a 2006 song by Escape The Fate
- "Guillotine", a 2016 song by Jon Bellion
- Guillotine (band), an Indian musical group
- Guillotine (British India album) (2007)
- Guillotine (Circle album) (2003)
- "Guillotine" (Death Grips song), a 2011 song by Death Grips

== Sports ==
- Guillotine (wrestling) or the twister, a spinal lock
- Guillotine choke, a martial arts chokehold
- Guillotine, a press-up where the chest, head, and neck are lowered below the plane of the hands

== Other uses ==
- Guillotine (character), a Marvel Comics character
- Guillotine (1998 game), a card game by Wizards of the Coast
- Guillotine (1987 game), a board game by Avril et Floréal
- Guillotine (magic trick)
- Cloture or guillotine, a motion or process in parliamentary procedure aimed at bringing debate to a quick end
- Guillotine Society, a Japanese anarchist terrorist group

== See also ==
- Flying guillotine, a Chinese premodern combat weapon
