= Shrapnel: The Official BattleTech Magazine =

Shrapnel: The Official BattleTech Magazine is a magazine covering various BattleTech topics such as short fiction and campaign scenarios. The first issue was released in June 2020 by Catalyst Game Labs. Various BattleTech authors have appeared in the issues, such as Michael A. Stackpole and Blaine Lee Pardoe. It was a created after Catalyst Game Labs reached a stretch goal in a Kickstarter campaign. It has been called a spiritual successor to the original BattleTechnology magazine from the 1990s. The magazine is helmed by John Helfers and Philip A. Lee.

== Authors ==
Below are a list of authors who have appeared in Shrapnel Magazine.

- Michael A. Stackpole
- Blaine Lee Pardoe
- Loren L Coleman
- Bryan Young
- Julian Michael Carver
- Keith R. A. DeCandido
- Kevin Killiany
- Jason Schmetzer
- Tom Leveen
- Aaron Cahall
- Craig A. Reed Jr.
- Eric Salzman

== Reception ==
In a review of Shrapnel in Black Gate, John ONeill said "The BattleTech universe, with its widely diverse warring human factions scattered across the galaxy, is one of the most richly detailed fictional creations in science fiction, and it’s a delight to revisit it, and see such a creative group of individuals bringing it to life again."
