= MechCommander 2 =

2001 video game

- Developer: FASA Interactive
- Publisher: Microsoft
- Producer: Mitch Gitelman
- Designer: Michael Lee
- Programmer: Frank Savage
- Artist: Leigh Kellogg
- Composer: Duane Decker
- Series: BattleTech
- Platform: Microsoft Windows
- Release: NA: July 19, 2001; EU: August 24, 2001
- Genre: Real-time tactics
- Modes: Single player, Multiplayer

MechCommander 2 is a 2001 real-time tactics video game based on the BattleTech/MechWarrior franchise, developed by FASA Interactive and distributed by Microsoft. It is a sequel to MechCommander.

== Development history ==
In 2006, Microsoft released a portion of the source code along with most game assets (i.e. everything needed to compile the game without networking support and without all the art) under a Shared Source license in order to demonstrate its XNA Build system. The source release documentation warns developers that not all code necessary to produce a complete build has been included:

Source files are not provided for all of the output files from the MechCommander 2 build. For these output files, the built file itself exists in the source folder and is simply copied from there to the FinalBuild folder. Be careful not to delete .fst or .pak files that exist in the source directory at the time of installation because you will not be able to rebuild these.

== Plot ==
The single-player game takes place on Carver V, a planet previously held by House Liao, but recently mostly captured by the Federated Commonwealth, who killed the local Liao ruler Mandarin Cho in combat. At the beginning of the story, the Federated Commonwealth, an alliance of House Steiner and House Davion, is breaking apart due to Archon Katrina Steiner's controversial seizure of power. All the Houses on Carver V are avoiding any military action that could endanger the peace, so when a suspiciously well-equipped bandit force threatens Steiner territory, House Steiner employs a mercenary team led by the player, who takes the role of their commander.

In Campaign 1, the player is under the command of Colonel David Renard of House Steiner, and starts with relatively simple missions to destroy minor bandit forces. However, a chase of a bandit convoy results in a firefight with Liao units. It is then revealed that the bandit leader is an ex-Liao officer. Renard authorizes full-scale attacks on Liao forces despite protests from Steiner Ambassador Yee. The campaign ends with the destruction of the bandit HQ and the death of their leader. Over the course of the campaign, Colonel Renard becomes increasingly unstable, ending with the words: "Do this and get out. I've got plans for Carver V and you don't want to be part of them".

In Campaign 2, the player's mercenary team enters into a new contract with House Liao. The player is under the command of Mandrissa Anita Cho (widow of Mandarin Cho), who wants the planet for her son, Captain Jason Cho. The player is tasked with various covert operations, including the destruction of the interstellar communications relay on Carver V's moon and strikes against House Davion and House Steiner designed to implicate each other. Between Mandrissa Cho's machinations, Renard's instability, and the lack of off-world communications, Steiner and Davion forces on Carver V go to war. House Liao then makes a grab for power, but due to Jason Cho's incompetence as a commander, Liao forces are badly beaten and are forced to negotiate a truce with House Steiner. Colonel Renard agrees to share Carver V with House Liao in return for their help eliminating the Davions and the player's mercenaries. The player is forced to flee before the advancing Steiner and Liao forces, and are saved by resistance forces led by Baxter, a local partisan leader who wants his planet to become independent.

In Campaign 3, Baxter and Davion commander Major Kelly (Patricia Kara) have allied, as Davion supports an independent Carver V. In exchange for the opportunity for revenge and Clan technology, the player fights for the rebels, destroying the Liao palace, killing the crazed Colonel Renard, and destroying Steiner High Command on Carver V.

The Campaign ends with Archon Katrina Steiner mourning Colonel Renard's death, Baxter becoming President of Carver V, which is renamed Liberty, and the mercenary team returning to the Periphery - raising their price on MercNet: "Peace has been restored on Carver V by an unlikely source - a mercenary commander".

== BattleMechs ==
A BattleMech attempts to sneak up behind a hostile Highlander 'Mech.

MechCommander 2 features 29 mechs each with their own strengths and weaknesses. Generally, the lighter Mechs scout while the heavier mechs fight. Depending on which side the mercenary Mechcommander works for, different mechs would be available for purchase and salvage after combat missions. The mechs from each House also display different characteristics; heavy firepower for House Steiner mechs, agility and advanced sensors for House Liao mechs, and superior-quality 'imported' Clan mechs for House Davion.

== Reception ==
Reception

Aggregate score
Aggregator	Score
Metacritic	80/100

Review scores
Publication	Score
Computer Games Magazine	3.5/5
Computer Gaming World	3.5/5
Edge	4/10
Eurogamer	7/10
Game Informer	8.75/10
GamePro	4/5
GameRevolution	B+
GameSpot	7.7/10
GameSpy	84%
GameZone	9.3/10
IGN	8.2/10
Next Generation	4/5
PC Gamer (US)	80%
X-Play	4/5

The game received "favorable" reviews according to the review aggregation website Metacritic. John Lee of NextGen called it "An eminently playable, thoroughly engrossing game that's very close to its roots."
