= MechWarrior: Tactical Command =

- Developer: Personae Studios
- Publisher: Personae Studios
- Series: MechWarrior
- Platform: iOS 5.0
- Release: WW: September 27, 2012; (iPad): WW: March 6, 2013; (iPhone)
- Genres: Real-time strategy, Mecha
- Mode: Single player

MechWarrior: Tactical Command is a real-time strategy game based on the BattleTech universe developed for iOS. It was developed by Singaporean studio Personae Studios and first released on September 27, 2012. The mobile game supports all iOS 5.0 and above devices including the iPhone, iPod Touch, and iPad.

== Gameplay ==
MechWarrior: Tactical Command takes place in the BattleTech universe, a science-fiction universe that often centers around pitched battles between human-piloted walking, heavily armed and armored machines, called BattleMechs. The game involves a real-time strategy experience and involves the player commanding a lance of MechWarriors in battle against the enemy. The game supports full 3D rotation within the environment and it also includes numerous mechanics such as heat sensitivity in the mechs as well as individual limb health and damage. There are 21 missions in the game spread among 3 different planets with 3 different difficulty modes available. Additionally, there is also a MechLab feature that allows the player to customize mechs by modifying specific features such as resources, technology, weaponry and other BattleMech upgrades.

== Plot ==
This game occurs shortly after the 4th succession wars on the planet of Winfield, which is still contested between the Federated Commonwealth, an alliance of the paramilitaries of noble houses Steiner and Davion, and the Draconis Combine. The player is introduced as a new mechcommander stationed on the planet to assist in quashing the Combine forces that are seeking to take it from the Fedcom forces due to continuing bad blood between both sides. This all comes to an end when an unidentified force of mechwarriors invade the planet, utilizing powerful and highly advanced mechs, later revealing themselves as Clan Jade Falcon, one of several Clans invading the Inner Sphere. Although many elite Fedcom units are lost, including the veteran Hammer Lance team who fought in the Succession War, the player is able to form an alliance with the Draconis forces on Winfield and flee with them to the planet of Butler. The player's victories over the clanners bring the ire of the commanding officer of the Winfield invasion group, Eric Hazen, who purses the player throughout the Campaign.

The game ends with the Commander and his lance forces taking part in the battle of Twycross. This marks the turning point in the Clan wars and ends with the players lance members hoping for a better future.

== Development ==
MechWarrior: Tactical Command was first announced to be in development by Singapore-based game developer Personae Studios on December 6, 2011. It was previously a secret project known only by the codename "Seattle Project". The developer had partnered with Smith & Tinker and later Catalyst Game Labs, Studio MekTek and Virtual World Entertainment for the development of MechWarrior: Tactical Command. The iPad version of the game was released on September 27, 2012. The iPhone version of the game was originally intended for release to the app store in 2012, but was delayed until 2013. A demo of the game was presented at E3 that time. Post-launch, the game received an update to support newer iOS devices, but further development and support of the game has ceased.

== Reception ==
MechWarrior: Tactical Command received 51/100 on Metacritic. Nick Tylwalk for GameZebo gave it a 60/100.
