= BattleTech Tactical Handbook =

Game supplement to BattleTech

BattleTech Tactical Handbook is a game supplement published by FASA in 1994 for the mecha wargame BattleTech.

== Description ==
BattleTech Tactical Handbook is an 80-page softcover book written by Jim Long and Stuart Johnson containing advanced rules and additional equipment for BattleTech.

The first part of the book splits play into Basic, Tournament, and Optional Advanced levels. One Optional Advanced rule is the "double-blind" option for combat, where the two combatants maneuver their units on separate maps, and a neutral referee tells each player what is seen. A strategic operational campaign links a series of scenarios together.

The second part of the book provides advanced rules for new technologies such as

- upgraded ballistic weapons such as Caseless and Hyper-Velocity Autocannons, Mech Mortars and Ultra Autocannons
- four-legged mecha
- improved ECM capability and a Laser Anti-Missile system

== Reception ==
In Issue 17 of the Australian game magazine Australian Realms, Graham Holman noted "the handbook provides many new variations for the experienced player ... the Campaign rules add variety and spice for the battle hardened BattleTech tactician." Holman concluded, "The Tactical Handbook is an excellent addition to the BattleTech system, giving greater depth and playability without introducing convoluted and complicated rule changes. If you need a BattleTech challenge, go out and buy this one; but don’t forget to get your referee a copy too!"

In the November 1994 edition of Dragon (Issue #211), Rick Swan warned players that these rules added complexities to an already complex game, concluding, "All this is strictly for wargamers — make that serious wargamers. Role-players can put their wallets away."
