= BattleTech: Counterstrike =

BattleTech: Counterstrike is a 1997 collectible card game expansion set published by Wizards of the Coast for BattleTech Trading Card Game.

== Contents ==
BattleTech: Counterstrike is a set in which 99 new cards are introduced which fall into three main categories:

- Nearly half are new Battlemechs from both the Inner Sphere and the Clans. A few offer quick deployment abilities—like Hermes, a weak but fast 'mech that can patrol immediately, and Thorn, which enables extra deployment.
- About a quarter of the cards are Command cards, like those from Deckmaster. These offer strategic advantages like resource generation and targeted damage. Examples include Veteran Officer, which helps retrieve mission cards, and Lostech Cache, which taps for resources.
- The remaining cards are Missions. They reflect faction-specific tactics, such as the Inner Sphere's Lance Formation and Diversion, which reward precise group sizes, and the Clans' Star Formation and Diversion, which require five 'mechs for optimal effect.

== Reception ==
Steve Faragher reviewed BattleTech: Counterstrike for Arcane magazine, rating it an 8 out of 10 overall, and stated that "This is a good set that delivers Battletech with the extra bit of punch that the game lacked. With Counterstrike, expect your games to be slightly shorter - but also more fun."
