= Royalty and Rogues =

Royalty and Rogues is a 1994 role-playing adventure for MechWarrior published by FASA.

== Plot summary ==
Royalty and Rogues is an adventure in which an adventure campaign is presented for 4 to 7 players.

== Reception ==
Robert DeVoe reviewed Royalty and Rogues in White Wolf Inphobia #57 (July, 1995), rating it a 3.5 out of 5 and stated that "[The price] is about average for an adventure module, and most, like this one, are good for several game sessions."

== Reviews ==
- Dragon #214
- Armadillo Droppings (Issue 31 - Winter/Spring 1995)
