= The Fury of Dracula =

Dracula-themed board game

A Boardgame of Gothic Horror
- Box cover of 1987 edition
- Designers: Stephen Hand
- Publishers: Games Workshop (1987); Fantasy Flight Games (2006)
- Players: 2 to 4 (2 to 5 for 2006 edition)
- Setup time: 15 minutes
- Playing time: 1 to 3 hours
- Chance: Medium
- Skills: Observation; Deduction; Cooperation

The Fury of Dracula is a board game for 2-4 players designed by Stephen Hand and published by Games Workshop in 1987. Fantasy Flight Games released an updated version in 2006 as Fury of Dracula, and a third edition in 2015 by the same name. WizKids Games released a fourth edition in 2019.

== Theme ==
The game takes place in Europe during 1898, eight years after the events in Bram Stoker’s novel, Dracula. One player takes the role of Count Dracula, who is seeking revenge by building an army of vampires throughout Europe. The remaining players take the roles of Hunters Abraham Van Helsing, Dr John Seward and Lord Godalming. (In the second and all subsequent editions, Mina Harker was added as a fourth Hunter.) The Hunters, following clues Dracula has left behind, join together to destroy Dracula before he can succeed.

== First edition ==
...it was inevitable that I would get round to designing a Dracula boardgame.

— Stephen Hand, In Search of the Real Dracula

Disappointed by the limited availability of horror boardgames, Stephen Hand began the initial treatment of his Dracula-based horror game in 1985. His original conception was a two-game set entitled Dracula: Fact and Fiction; one part would be a fantasy game, and the other part would be a dry, historical simulation of Vlad the Impaler's Turkish campaigns. Hand ultimately shelved the project due to time constraints. A short time later, he resurrected the project after receiving encouragement from Marc Gascoigne, eventually submitting the finished project to Games Workshop in the summer of 1986. Although Workshop liked the game, they put the game on hold while they focused on stronger products, offering Hand a choice of waiting for a suitable production gap to appear, or converting the game to fit into the Warhammer Fantasy World. Games Workshop ultimately produced The Fury of Dracula and released it in the autumn of 1987, with plastic figurines.

Games Workshop also released a limited edition boxed set that had metal rather than plastic miniatures, the only differentiation in the external packaging being a circular sticker marked "Limited Edition".

=== Gameplay ===
This edition was designed for 2-4 players (Dracula and up to three Hunters). The Hunters move openly across the game board, which is a stylised map of late 19th century Europe, while the Dracula player moves in secret by using a separate small board hidden behind a screen. By various means, the Hunters try to deduce and uncover Dracula's path, overcoming whatever obstacles he has placed along the way (including wolves, rats, bats, armed minions, fledgling vampires, fog, storms and plagues). The Hunters also gather weapons and equipment such as rifles, stakes, garlic and holy water for the eventual showdown.

The Hunters can move by sea, road or rail, while Dracula is permitted to move by sea or road only. Moving by rail permits the Hunters to cover a greater distance than they could by road, but requires a die roll; the result of the roll can be anything from being delayed a turn to being able to travel to as many as three towns connected by a railway.

Differences between the Hunters is minimal: Godalming receives a +1 to first-round initiative against Dracula's minions and a -1 against Dracula himself, while Van Helsing received the inverse. Seward receives no modifiers.

=== Combat ===
Combat is performed on a round by round basis. The time of combat is determined by a die roll, although various cards played by either side can force a particular time of day.

Combatants first choose a combat option in secret, using cardboard chits. The basic options for an unarmed combatant are Fist, Dodge or Escape. Each combatant also gets an additional combat option for each weapon they possess, although Hunters are not allowed to use the same combat option twice in consecutive rounds unless the Hunter possesses two weapons of the same type, which can then be used alternately.

Dracula's combat options vary greatly depending on the time of day; if caught during the day, he can only use the basic unarmed combat options. During the night, due to his supernatural powers, he has access to many more combat options.

Once every combatant has secretly determined a combat option, each side rolls a die for initiative. Each side then reveals their chosen combat option, and the results of the options and initiatives are cross referenced on the appropriate chart to determine the winner for the round.

This procedure repeats itself until one side is dead or successfully retreats.

=== Wounds and bites ===
Each Hunter has 12 Wound points, representing the amount of injuries he can sustain. Combat, encounters and certain event cards can cause damage to the Hunter, and the Hunter is eliminated from the game once the number of Wound points is reduced to zero. Wounds can be recovered by using event cards or by resting.

If a Hunter is bitten by Dracula or a vampire, the player is given a Bite token. While under the effects of a bite, certain event cards (marked "Bitten Only") become playable — these can be beneficial or detrimental. A Hunter with a Bite token suffers penalties in combat against Dracula. Being bitten a second time results in the hunter becoming a vampire; he is eliminated from the game and given to the Dracula player as a generic vampire encounter.

=== Dracula's Blood points ===
Dracula has 12 Blood points, which are the equivalent of Wound points. Combat and certain event cards can cause Dracula to lose Blood points; in addition, every time he embarks on a sea voyage, he loses a Blood point. Dracula can also spend Blood points to activate special abilities. When Dracula's Blood points are reduced to zero, he enters Blood Death; he must retreat to Castle Dracula by the quickest route possible and he must escape every encounter as soon as possible. He can no longer win the game (although he may be able to force a draw). If he takes an additional 12 points of damage while in Blood Death, he is destroyed, resulting in a Hunter's major victory.

=== Victory conditions ===
Each side has a set of difficult major victory conditions and easier minor victory conditions. Once any of them have been fulfilled, either side can declare a victory. Once a minor victory has been declared, play continues until either a major victory condition is met, or all the conditions to achieve a major victory become impossible. For example, the Hunters can claim a minor victory if they force Dracula to flee to Castle Dracula. They can subsequently claim a major victory if they can find and kill Dracula at his castle; but if he successfully hides first, the major victory becomes impossible, and the game ends with a minor victory for the Hunters. It is not unusual for both sides to be able to simultaneously claim minor victories.

== Second edition ==
In 2006, Fantasy Flight Games released the second edition of the game, dropping "The" from the title and renaming it Fury of Dracula. The rules featured a few changes to gameplay.

=== Gameplay ===
The second edition adds a "Vampire Track" to the game — Dracula advances the counter by one for each Hunter he eliminates, for each vampire he creates, or for each complete day/night cycle he survives.

A fourth Hunter, Mina Harker, has been added, making the game playable by 2-5 players.

Each Hunter has a special ability. for example, Van Helsing can withstand an additional bite; Godalming can reroll any unsatisfactory train movement die roll due to his Wealth.

Rather than using a separate board to track Dracula's movements, Dracula uses a trail of face-down cards, each representing a location on the board. Only his six previous locations can contain any encounters. As he moves along the map, the oldest location moves further down the track until it reaches the seventh position, where Dracula can "mature" the encounter or discard it. Maturing the encounter will have varying effects depending on the encounter itself - it could discarded without effect or in the case of vampires, increase the Vampire track by two, bringing Dracula closer to winning the game.

Rather than determining the time of day for combat through a random die roll, the time of day is displayed on a day/night tracker that advances incrementally each turn. Every time the track advances to a new day, in addition to Dracula gaining a Vampire track point, the Hunters gain 1 Resolve point; this can be used to reveal Dracula's oldest location, allow an individual Hunter to take an extra turn, or heal a single Hunter.

If the Dracula player is found to have cheated, whether intentionally or accidentally, the suggested punishment is to clear Dracula's trail to one location — revealing his current location — while suffering Blood point loss equal to a "Killed" result. (If this would destroy him, he is left with 1 Blood point instead).

=== Combat ===
First edition's cardboard chits for combat options have been eliminated in favour of small cards, which also contain all information about combat results, eliminating the need for separate combat resolution tables.

=== Wounds/blood and bites ===
Each Hunter in the second edition has a different number of Wound points; if a Hunter's Wound points are reduced to zero, the Hunter must recuperate at the Hospital of St Joseph and St Mary, but may continue to play. In addition, being bitten twice no longer eliminates the Hunter from the game; instead the Hunter is sent to the Hospital to recover. Van Helsing is resistant to bites and can withstand three before being sent to the hospital. Mina Harker begins with a Bite Token, meaning that "bitten only" events are usable right from the start of the game.

=== Blood points ===
Dracula's Blood points have been increased from 12 to 15. However, although a variety of events and special abilities make it much easier for Dracula to recover Blood points in second edition, if he is reduced to zero Blood points, Dracula is destroyed. However, Dracula can no longer be killed outright by a single attack. Suffering a "Killed" result in combat reduces his Blood Points to a predetermined amount on his character sheet (0, 5 and 10 Blood points), and combat continues.

=== Victory conditions ===
First edition's varying degrees of victory have been eliminated in favour of a much simpler system: The Hunters win if they are able to kill Dracula. Dracula wins if he is able to advance the Vampire track to 6.

== Credits for first and second editions ==
First edition:

- Designer: Stephen Hand
- Rules Editor: Mike Brunton
- Graphic Design: Bil Sedgwick
- Board Art: Colin Dixon
- Counter Art: Dave Andrews
- Character Illustrations: Martin McKenna, Colin Dixon, Dave Andrews
- Paste-up: Heidi Allman, Dave Clemmett, Dave Oliver
- Playtesters: Mandy Wooton, Andrew Colclough, Colin Hand, Matther Tudor & Co, Alan Merret, Graeme Davis, Bil Sedgwick, Jervis Johnson, Sean Masterson, Charles Elliot, Tim Pollard
- Box Art: Jim Burns

Second edition:

- Designer: Stephen Hand
- Second Edition Development: Kevin Wilson
- Rules: Kevin Wilson
- Editing: James Torr
- Graphic Design: Andrew Navaro, Scott Nicely
- Art Direction: Kevin Wilson, AndrewNavaro
- Flavor Text: Dan Clark
- Lead Playtester for this Edition: Tony Doepner
- Playtesting for this Edition: Rodger Bernstein, Matthew B. Cary, Pat Harrigan, Evan Kinne, Thyme Ludwig, Devin Nordberg, Laura Robeson, Daniel Scheppard, John Skogerboe, Jason Allan Lee Smith, Tim Uren, Thor Wright, and FFG staff.
- Executive Developer: Greg Benage
- Publisher: Christian T. Petersen

== Third edition ==
Fantasy Flight Games released a Third Edition in 2015, featuring new graphic design, artwork and streamlined rules. In this edition, Dracula can only act during the night, while the Hunters are active both day and night. Rumor tokens have been added to allow Dracula to mislead the Hunters.

== Fourth edition ==
WizKids Games released a fourth edition in 2019, featuring five painted figurines and larger combat cards.

== Digital edition ==
Nomad Games released Fury of Dracula: Digital Edition, a digital adaptation of Fury of Dracula on 12 Nov, 2020. This digital edition is based on the 4th Edition of the board game.

== Reception ==
In the April 1988 edition of Dragon (Issue 132), Jim Bambra liked the first edition of the game, saying, "[It] takes some of the best elements of role-playing games and neatly transposes them into an intriguing and fun board game." Bambra recommended the game, concluding, "Steeped in Gothic atmosphere and tinged with the unexpected, The Fury of Dracula game deserves to be in every gamer’s collection."

In the February 1988 issue of The Games Machine (Issue 3), John Wood thought the game components were "of excellent quality, even including metal miniatures to represent the four protagonists." He noted the rules were clearly written, and the thoughtful inclusion of a pull-out reference section "makes the rulebook largely unnecessary during play." He concluded with a strong recommendation, saying, "Great fun and good value at the price. The gradual build-up of tension and the sudden and dramatic confrontations make the game a real, er, scream to play."

The Fury of Dracula was chosen for inclusion in the 2007 book Hobby Games: The 100 Best. Anthony J. Gallela comments: "Based on Bram Stoker's famous novel, The Fury of Dracula is a breakthrough title that introduced cooperative and deductive elements to the adventure board game subgenre, while managing to retain the feeling of breathless excitement that players seek in an adventure game."

== Other reviews ==
- Pyramid
- Casus Belli #43 (Feb 1988)
- Casus Belli #45 (June 1988)
- Games #92
- Rue Morgue #56
