= BattleTech: The Crescent Hawk's Inception =

1988 video game

- Developer: Westwood Associates
- Publisher: Infocom
- Director: Brett Sperry
- Producer: Christopher Erhardt
- Programmers: Louis Castle; Barry Green
- Artists: Michael Goldberg; Joseph B. Hewitt IV; Maurine Y. Starkey
- Composer: Paul S. Mudra
- Series: BattleTech
- Platforms: Amiga, Apple II, Atari ST, Commodore 64, MS-DOS
- Release: 1988
- Genre: Role-playing
- Mode: Single-player

BattleTech: The Crescent Hawk's Inception is a turn-based adventure/role-playing video game released in 1988 by Westwood Associates and based on the BattleTech franchise. It was one of the first commercial ports of the license and features some of the franchise's worlds, institutions, political figures, and weapons, such as the three-story tall BattleMechs. It was followed by a sequel, BattleTech: The Crescent Hawk's Revenge, though that game featured significantly different gameplay, falling into the real-time tactics genre rather than adventure/role-playing.

== Plot ==
The player takes the role of Jason Youngblood, a young cadet MechWarrior stationed on Pacifica (also known as Chara III) in the Lyran Commonwealth. Stationed at the Citadel, Jason is learning how to pilot a BattleMech and also to fight with small arms, all the while having to live up to the reputation of his hero father, Jeremiah. During a training session in his 'Mech, the Citadel comes under attack from neighboring star-empire the Draconis Combine, slaying the Palace guard, Jeremiah apparently among them. Barely escaping, Jason is rescued from arrest by Draconis Police by Rex Pearce, a friend and colleague of Jeremiah's and a member of the Crescent Hawks. Together they must find and join up with fellow members of the Crescent Hawks, a special forces company established by Jeremiah and the Archon Katrina working in conjunction with the mercenary unit, the Kell Hounds.

== Gameplay ==
The game is divided into three sections, each with different objectives and gameplay style, but a similar interface. The first section is set at the Citadel, and as a way to get a feel for the engine and the interface the player must complete successively harder training missions in a BattleMech, and may also enroll in lessons in a selection of small arms. As well as giving the player an idea of the theme of the game, this section allows the player to "level up" and earn some C-bills, the staple currency in the BattleTech universe. Unusually, all of the game's plot events occur in-play, having the game start before the story. During one of the training missions, the citadel comes under attack and the game changes.

Battle scene (MS-DOS)

The second section of the game is much more staple RPG: finding people to join the player's party, finding better weapons, items to advance the plot, and, of course, engaging in or avoiding battles. The game here sees the growing party search Pacifica's towns and cities for the means to open an old Star League era cache of BattleMechs and other equipment Jeremiah seems to have concealed. Navigation around the map is timed to the computer's internal clock, when random encounters with enemy 'Mechs and infantry can occur. The player can choose to manually target his weapons (which introduces the turn based battle system) or can opt for computer-controlled combat. One of the towns is walled (the star port) and requires the 'Mechs to be parked in a Garage, meaning that a 'Mech is not always able to count as protection. Random attacks occur often and cannot always be fled from, and so during this section, keeping the player's 'Mech fully functional and protected becomes both challenging and important. The attackers become stronger if the player gains more 'Mechs, and less strong again if the player loses a 'Mech. C-Bill shortages can become a real problem, especially if the player is using weapons with ammunition like missile racks, or if no party member can perform 'Mech repairs. The final section, which is reached once the means of entry to the cave is discovered, consists of a series of puzzles, requiring a combination of luck and logic.

Although the game data contains info for all of the pre-3050 weaponry found in the table-top games, a very limited catalogue of 'Mechs appear in the actual game.

== Reception ==
Computer Gaming World's review of the game noted it wildly deviated from normal Infocom adventures, concluding, "It's a good game, but definitely for beginning to low intermediate players."

Tony Watson reviewed Battletech, The Crescent Hawk's Inception in Space Gamer/Fantasy Gamer No. 88. Watson commented that "it's a judgement call; while I enjoy playing the game, I like the way it was done more than its subject matter. Fans of the FASA Battletech universe will probably enjoy the game more than most players."

In a retrospective review of BattleTech: The Crescent Hawk's Inception in Black Gate, John ONeill said "the EGA graphics [...] were gorgeous eye-candy in 1988, and the ability to move a Mech around the screen and fire off its complement of missiles was thrilling. I know — I spent the first ten minutes of the game time doing exactly that (over and over again)."

== Notes ==
Ral Partha Phoenix Hawk Reward Miniature

Some first-wave releases of BattleTech: The Crescent Hawk's Inception included a goldenrod colored order form that the player could complete and mail-in. The form required correctly identifying the name of a 'mech hidden in the game's final complex and then upon successfully answering the question and submitting the form they would receive by mail a limited-edition Ral Partha miniature of the Phoenix Hawk LAM (Land-Air-Mech), the correct answer to the question. The secret 'mech was easy to find through simple gameplay, but not all game packages included the necessary form. This limited-edition miniature has become quite sought after by collectors of Battletech miniatures.
