= BattleTech: The Crescent Hawk's Revenge =

1990 video game

Battletech: The Crescent Hawks' Revenge
- Developer: Westwood Associates
- Publisher: Infocom
- Producers: Scott Berfield; Tony Van
- Designer: Tony Van
- Programmers: David R. Dettmer; Barry Green
- Artists: Chuck Austen; Scott Berfield; Joseph B. Hewitt IV; Jenny Martin; Rick Parks; Aaron E. Powell; Don Woo
- Composers: Paul S. Mudra; Dwight Kenichi Okahara
- Series: BattleTech
- Platform: MS-DOS
- Release: 1990
- Genre: Real-time tactics
- Mode: Single-player

BattleTech: The Crescent Hawks' Revenge is a real-time tactics game based in the FASA BattleTech universe. It is a direct sequel to BattleTech: The Crescent Hawk's Inception, though the gameplay is considerably different from that of the first title, which was primarily an adventure/role-playing game. The game was developed by Westwood Associates for Mediagenic, and produced by Scott Berfield.

== Gameplay ==
BattleTech: The Crescent Hawks' Revenge uses a proto-real-time strategy engine that allows players to pause the game every time orders are issued to a unit. Players can also speed up or slow down time, allowing them to play the game at any desired pace. The combat is modeled modestly well after classic BattleTech rules, much more so than the later MechCommander, making The Crescent Hawks' Revenge one of the few BattleTech games to closely follow the rule set of the board game.

The main part of the game is a linear campaign of missions, where the player is presented with a tactical battle that can last anywhere from 5 to 50 minutes. The first mission involves a simple battle between a Jenner 'Mech and a Locust 'Mech, serving as a tutorial and story kick-off. Later missions give the player control of four 'Mechs in their "command lance" and two additional lances.

Battle scene

The 'Mechs in the command lance can be controlled individually or given orders together as a lance, while 'Mechs in the two other lances are controlled by issuing orders to the entire lance only. This is another major strategy milestone, as The Crescent Hawks' Revenge had the concept of allowing the player to control both individual units and groups of units using the same control scheme.

The campaign is noted for its variety, where the player is tasked with objectives ranging from defending a crashed dropship, to stalling enemy units for a set amount of time, to protecting a convoy that is attempting to load up with ammunition. Campaign missions sometimes have multiple endings, and the outcome of a battle can influence the following missions.

However, the campaign is also noted as being very difficult, with some early campaign choices making subsequent missions much harder without the player realizing it. While the game attempts to present the player with multiple ways to complete some missions, the methods often vary wildly in difficulty, and the player would not know this until after trying all options.

== Plot ==
The story follows the protagonist of the previous Crescent Hawk game, Jason Youngblood, as he heads to the home base of the infamous Kell Hounds mercenary organization. The Hawks are attacked en route, crashland, and spend a good portion of the early game protecting their crashed dropship and helping the Kell Hounds repel the Kurita attack.

After repelling the attack, the Crescent Hawks go on a long series of missions to rescue Jason's father from his Kurita captors, at which they are successful. Jason is reunited with his father, who has been missing since the beginning of The Crescent Hawk's Inception.

The game then has a major timeskip to the period of the clan invasion. The Crescent Hawks join the Kell Hounds and fight alongside them in repelling the clan invasion, often alongside their former Kurita enemies. The Crescent Hawks, Kell Hounds, and Kurita forces are successful in defending the Kurita capital, and the game ends with the Hawks earning the respect of their new Kurita allies.

Notably, there is also a story crossover between the Crescent Hawks and the original MechWarrior game. In a short one-shot mission, the Crescent Hawks attempt to save the Blazing Aces, the mercenary group from the original MechWarrior game, from a Clan attack. They are unsuccessful at saving the main character, MechWarrior Gideon Vandenburg, who dies during the attack. However, Gideon has secretly hidden most of the Ace's 'Mechs from the clan, and the Blazing Aces survive despite their leader's death.

== Reception ==
Reception

Review scores
Publication	Score
Computer Gaming World	3/5
Dragon	4/5

Computer Gaming World in 1991 stated that BattleTech was an excellent conversion of the board game "without having to get out the tape measure and stack of charts", with good VGA graphics and sound card audio. In a 1992 survey of science fiction games the magazine gave the title three of five stars, and a 1994 survey of strategic space games set in the year 2000 and later gave the game two-plus stars out of five, stating that it "has strong role-playing elements, but still retains the tactical flavor of mechwarrior combat". The game was reviewed in 1991 in Dragon #167 by Hartley, Patricia, and Kirk Lesser in "The Role of Computers" column. The reviewers gave the game 4 out of 5 stars.

Jim Trunzo reviewed BattleTech: The Crescent Hawk's Revenge in White Wolf #25 (Feb./March, 1991), rating it a 4 out of 5 and stated that "It's no wonder that the previous Infocom BattleTech games have been best-sellers. When BattleTech fans find out that "The Crescent Hawk's Revenge allows you to do on the computer virtually anything you can do in the board game, this game's going to be on the top of every software best-selling list too."

In a 1999 retrospective, Computer Games Strategy Plus named The Crescent Hawk's Revenge as a runner-up for its "10 Essential Real-time Strategy Games" list.
