= MechCommander =

1998 real-time tactics video game

- Developer: FASA Interactive
- Publishers: MicroProse; Hasbro Interactive (Gold)
- Designers: Ross Babcock; Tom Dowd; Mitch Gitelman; Tim Ryan; Steve Scott; Denny Thorley; Jordan Weisman
- Programmer: Glenn Doren
- Artist: Todd Labonte
- Writers: Tom Dowd; Joel Machak; Jordan Weisman
- Composer: Duane Decker
- Series: BattleTech
- Platform: Windows
- Release: NA: June 24, 1998; EU/AU: July 1998
- Genre: Real-time tactics
- Modes: Single player, Multiplayer

MechCommander is a real-time tactics video game based on FASA's BattleTech/MechWarrior franchise, developed by FASA Interactive and distributed by MicroProse in 1998. An expansion pack, Desperate Measures, was released in 1999. A sequel, MechCommander 2, was released in 2001.

== Gameplay ==
Players assume the role of the commander of Zulu company from the Federated Commonwealth's First Davion Guards, a member of the Inner Sphere (IS). The planet Port Arthur must be taken back from the Clan Smoke Jaguar. The game's campaign progresses through 30 different missions broken into 5 operations with 6 missions apiece. Each mission consists of a number of objectives which may include destroying enemy units, capturing or defending enemy units, protecting friendly units, and capturing and defending bases. Some missions must be completed within a certain time limit.

Battle scene

In each mission, players controls a limited number of units which are either mechs or support vehicles. This control is through a simulated aerial viewscreen above the battlefield. Each mission restricts both the combined tonnage and the number of units allowed. Briefings are supplied prior to the start of the mission which lists the objectives and other relevant information. A wide range of strategies and tactics may be used on any given mission, and players can customize their forces for each one.

In between missions players can repair and refit mechs, assign mechwarriors to each mech and purchase mechs, vehicles, mechwarriors, and components. These items are purchased with Resource Points which are awarded for completing previous mission objectives. Few mechs, vehicles, mech pilots, and components can be purchased at the beginning of the campaign, but more become available as the game progresses. However, only IS technology can be purchased. Clan technology such as weaponry and new mechs must be salvaged from the battlefield. Salvaging equipment is an important feature of the game.

Each mech is piloted by a mechwarrior. Pilots increase in skill as they use them during missions. The more missions and kills a particular pilot has, the more experienced and valuable he or she becomes. If a pilot gains enough experience, he or she will increase in rank. The four ranks from least to greatest are "green", "regular", "veteran", and "elite". Rank determines how effective a pilot is in a certain class of mechs (light, medium, heavy, or assault).

== MechCommander: Desperate Measures ==
MechCommander: Desperate Measures is an expansion pack that was released in 1999. Set immediately after the liberation of Port Arthur, the player once again assumes command of Zulu company in a campaign to liberate the desolate planet Cermak in the Periphery, taken by a renegade Smoke Jaguar, Star Colonel Marcus Kotare (a character that was featured briefly in MechWarrior 2: Mercenaries), for an unknown reason that is revealed later in game. Once again, the player starts with inferior Inner Sphere mechs (pilots and mechs from original campaign cannot be exported into expansion), though both mechs and pilots are better than in the start of the original campaign. The expansion features a total of three campaigns. Aside from the missions, the expansion also includes a new soundtrack, new landscapes along with redesigned and new buildings, new weapons, three new mechs for each side—Stiletto, Bushwacker, and Mauler for IS and Shadow Cat, Nova Cat and Turkina for the Clan, and new vehicles including Alacorn, Pilum and Regulator tanks, as well as ammo trucks that also doubled as mobile bombs and Centipede scout vehicles. Desperate Measures also acted as testbed for the concept of custom NPC mechs that had their own names (like Kotare's Turkina), weapon configurations and overall superiority to the standard modifications. This idea was carried on to, and greatly improved in, MechCommander 2. A compilation called MechCommander Gold was released in 1999 that includes the base game and the expansion.

== Reception ==
Reception

Aggregate score
Aggregator	Score
GameRankings	80%

Review scores
Publication	Score
CNET Gamecenter	8/10
Computer Games Strategy Plus	3.5/5
Computer Gaming World	4/5
Game Informer	8/10
GameRevolution	B+
GameSpot	7.3/10
IGN	7.8/10
Next Generation	3/5
PC Accelerator	8/10
PC Gamer (US)	79%

The game received favorable reviews according to the review aggregation website GameRankings. Next Generation called it "a good first effort, and FASA is to be commended for trying something different in the overcrowded field of RTS games. Unfortunately, it lacks polish, and the repetition of each mission drags down the fun factor."

The Academy of Interactive Arts & Sciences nominated the game for "PC Strategy Game of the Year" at the 2nd Annual Interactive Achievement Awards, although it ultimately lost to Sid Meier's Alpha Centauri. The game was a runner-up for Computer Games Strategy Plus' 1998 "Real-Time Strategy Game of the Year" award, which ultimately went to StarCraft. The staff called the former game "great", but argued that "only StarCraft was stellar".

Due to its science fiction setting, MechCommander received an overt recommendation from The Sci-Fi Channel (now SyFy), to the point of Sci-Fi's logo being present on the box art. Along with Nightlong: Union City Conspiracy, it was one of the few games to ever be officially recommended by Sci-Fi.

== Reviews ==
- The Duelist #34
