= Central America (game) =

Central America: The United States' Backyard War is a board wargame published by Victory Games a subsidiary of Avalon Hill in 1987. Designed by James McQuaid and developed by Mark Herman, it came with thick rules and 780 counters. Although interest in the topic was high, the game was met with an indifferent reception from purchasers. Nevertheless, it won the 1987 Charles S. Roberts Award for Best Modern Era Board Game.

== Reviews ==
- Casus Belli #42 (Dec 1987)
