= Rogue Trooper (board game) =

Rogue Trooper is the name of a British board wargame based on the 2000 AD comic strip of the same name. It was released in 1987 and published by Games Workshop.

== Gameplay ==
In the comic, genetically created soldiers (Genetic Infantryman) are battling on Nu-Earth in the far future on the side of the Southers, a war without rules and where chemical and biological weapons are used with such frequency that the atmosphere is lethal. At the Quartz Zone Massacre, the enemy Norts - with the help of a treacherous Souther - launched an attack that massacred all but one of the Genetic Infantrymen. He became Rogue Trooper and set out to hunt down the traitor on his own side who helped mastermind the massacre.

Although there was only one surviving Genetic Infantryman in the comic, the boardgame is for several players and thus takes a bit of artistic liberty and declares there were actually several survivors. The opposing players control one Rogue Trooper each and must hunt down the traitor across the devastated wastes of Nu-Earth. The winner is the one who finds and kills the traitor.

It employed a board separated into hex map areas representing different parts of Nu-Earth. Plastic miniatures represent the GIs and a card-system is employed for revealing who or what lay in each of the areas as the players explore the planet.

== Reception ==
Jervis Johnson reviewed Rogue Trooper for White Dwarf #89, and stated that "it's fun, can be played to a finish in 2-3 hours and all the players are involved right up to the end. C'mon Gunnar, we've got a traitor to find..."

== Reviews ==
- Casus Belli #40 (Oct 1987)

== See also ==
- Rogue Trooper computer games
