= Living Legends (MechWarrior) =

Role-playing game supplement

Living Legends is an adventure published by FASA in 1995 for the science fiction mecha role-playing game MechWarrior.

== Contents ==
This role-playing adventure, written by Diane Piron-Gelman, Chris Hartford and Bryan Nystul, is part of a long line of MechWarrior adventures scenarios that takes place during the Succession Wars as well as the Clan Invasion of the Inner Sphere.

In the adventure, the players take the role of some members of the Explorer Corps who are trying to sabotage a Clan Smoke warship and escape safely. The players encounter security guards as well as dinosaurs.

== Reception ==
In the February 1996 edition of Arcane (Issue 3), Alex Bund gave a thumbs up, saying, "All in all this is a brilliant supplement - one which any Mech Warrior referee should consider as an addition to his collection, especially if his players get a little too cocky about their abilities. Let them see how good they really are." Bund concluded by giving this adventure an above average rating of 8 out of 10.

In the May 1996 edition of Dragon (Issue #229), Rick Swan called this "an action-packed adventure... good, goofy fun, and easy to run." Swan warned that the authors of the adventure highly recommended that potential referees should read five other supplements before running this adventure, and concluded, "That's a lot of homework."
