= The Succession Wars =

- Designers: L. Ross Babcock III
- Publishers: FASA Corporation, Fantasy Productions, Inc.
- Publication: 1987
- Players: 2 − 5
- Playing time: 240 minutes
- Age range: 10+

The Succession Wars is a 1987 FASA Corporation wargame set in the BattleTech universe, representing the struggle for power at a strategic level. The title of the version published in Germany is MechWars - Kampf um die Innere Sphäre.

== Gameplay ==
Players assume the role of one of the five House Lords of the Inner Sphere, and fight to conquer all the other Houses and become the undisputed leader of a restored Star League. The rules are fairly simple by wargame standards, but ambiguous in places. The game uses an area-based mapboard. Units must be transported by JumpShips to move from region to region. The counters come in different sizes, representing leaders, Mech units, conventional forces, JumpShips, manufacturing centers, and markers. The game also comes with C-bill play money and events cards.

The main scenario is set in the BattleTech universe of 3025, shortly before the Fourth Succession War, and is unbalanced, in keeping with the unequal balance of power. There is also a First Succession War scenario, in which all players start off on an equal footing.

== Reviews ==
- GM #2
- Casus Belli #51
