= MechWarrior 2: Mercenaries =

1996 video game

- Developer: Activision
- Publisher: Activision
- Director: Jack Mamais
- Producer: Tim Morten
- Designer: Dustin Browder
- Programmer: Bill Ferrer
- Writer: Dustin Browder
- Composer: Jeehun Hwang
- Series: MechWarrior
- Platforms: DOS, Windows 95
- Release: September 25, 1996
- Genre: Vehicle simulation game
- Modes: Single-player, multiplayer

MechWarrior 2: Mercenaries is a video game released in September 1996 as a stand-alone expansion to MechWarrior 2: 31st Century Combat and the last BattleTech game made by Activision. In this game, the player takes control of a mercenary squad that pilots giant, robotic fighting machines in the far future of an interstellar civilization, with player control over the squad's finances and a choice of missions.

== Gameplay ==
The game plays similar to MechWarrior 2: 31st Century Combat: the player pilots a large, robotic combat vehicle, called a "BattleMech", using a first- or third-person view. The player character and their BattleMech must fight enemy BattleMechs and complete other mission objectives. The player can also command a computer-controlled squad of BattleMech pilots during missions. As the player progresses through the game, they can acquire additional BattleMechs to pilot and customize the weapons and gear of the BattleMechs they own. More BattleMechs are available than in MechWarrior 2: 31st Century Combat, as well as other vehicles that can be piloted or hired as support.

Mercenaries progresses through a series of discrete missions, some of which the player must attempt or complete to advance through the game. However, the player is able to choose at points which jobs they or their squad will accept over others, and not all missions or objectives require player success to advance, allowing for variance in each playthrough. An optional mode requires the player to manage their mercenary squad's finances, as they fund BattleMech customizations, repairs between missions and other expenses through mission contracts; in this mode, the player must select contracts with the squad's financial well-being in mind, as insolvency leads to a game over.

== Plot ==
Mercenaries is a prequel to the other MechWarrior 2 games and, like the other games, presents a clash of interstellar military and political powers in humanity's far future. Its story culminates in the invasion of the Milky Way Galaxy's disunited "Inner Sphere" region by a technologically superior force, the Clans. The game adapts the pivotal years from 3044 to 3052 in the fictional timeline of the BattleTech franchise, ending with the critical Battle of Luthien.

The player, a mercenary BattleMech pilot working for hire within the Inner Sphere, can take contracts from any of four Inner Sphere factions: the Draconis Combine, the Federated Commonwealth, ComStar, or the Free Rasalhague Republic. The Draconis Combine and the Federated Commonwealth, the Inner Sphere's two great powers, are making moves towards yet another war after the stalemate of the last one, building up their forces and fighting strategic skirmishes to position themselves for the coming conflict. Meanwhile, ComStar and the Free Raselhague Republic try to play both the larger powers off against each other to serve their own ends. The player can accept contracts from both sides in the brewing conflict without censure from either, though doing so will cause time-limited contract openings to close if the player is already "booked".

Player missions include helping (and crushing) uprisings against the existing powers, deep recon and raids, anti-pirate campaigns and even fights against other mercenary units. Other contracts include guarding the surface of an icy comet during its transport through outer space to a world in need of water, or babysitting an incompetent royal BattleMech pilot who believes he is in command of a reputation-building combat mission. Another group of missions chronicles the player's bid for the Championship of Solaris, the winning crown of a deadly and decadent professional sports tournament where BattleMechs fight inside massive enclosed arenas.

The plot of Mercenaries turns dramatically as the buildup to the impending war suddenly ends, aborted by the shock invasion of the Inner Sphere by a third party: the Clans, a mysterious and overwhelming force from the galaxy's outer regions. The Clans boast more advanced weaponry and BattleMechs than those of the Inner Sphere powers, and their ruling party forwards a militant doctrine of conquest. The invaders launch a crusade through the factious Inner Sphere in a drive to seize its worlds and, ultimately, "Terra"—the planet Earth, which the legends of the Clans portray as an Edenic paradise.

In the game's remaining missions, the player is thrust into battles against the "unknown 'Mechs" of the invading Clans. Captured by the enemy, the player escapes their BattleMech guards in a stolen hovertank and returns to the Inner Sphere. The player goes on to fight in some of the most pivotal battles of the war, such as the Battle of Wolcott and the game's climactic campaign, the Invasion of Luthien.

The game ends with an event scene presenting the Battle of Tukayyid, in which the fate of the war will be decided.

== Development ==
The developers had little choice but to make the game a prequel, since FASA would not allow Activision to use any time period in the BattleTech franchise's fictional timeline later than the time period already depicted in the expansion MechWarrior 2: Ghost Bear's Legacy.

The MechWarrior 2 engine was still used but with upgraded graphics, with terrain texture mapping, enhanced lighting effects and higher resolutions. A completely new musical score was devised for the game, as well as native Internet-playing ability.

== Reception ==
Reception

Review scores
Publication	Score
Computer Gaming World	4.5/5
GameSpot	8.5/10
Next Generation	4/5
PC PowerPlay	85%
Computer Games Strategy Plus	3.5/5
PC Magazine	4/5
PC Games	A−

Computer Gaming World rated the game highly, praising the graphics, AI and gameplay elements as well as calling it a significant improvement over MechWarrior 2 and its previous stand-alone expansion, MechWarrior 2: Ghost Bear's Legacy. The magazine also gave it the Space Simulation of the Year award the following year, as chosen by staff and readers. Bernard H. Yee of PC Magazine wrote, "With its new resource management requirements, its cutthroat attitude, and its free online hooks, MechWarrior 2: Mercenaries is the most complete, fun and addictive game in the MechWarrior series." A reviewer for Next Generation noted the additions of "fully texture-mapped mechs, particle-system explosions, and much more realistic environments" to MechWarrior 2, and was pleased with how the mercenaries structure gives the player greater freedom with respect to choosing missions and other elements. He criticized that building mechs is slow and tedious and the enemy AI is too difficult, but concluded that "Mercenaries is at the top of the mech sim heap, hands down." Trent Ward of GameSpot praised the scenarios, graphics, resource management aspects, voice acting, network play, and mission design, though he felt the music does not hold up over the long play sessions which the game demands. He summarized it as "all you've been waiting for and more."

In Computer Games Strategy Plus, Tom Chick criticized Mercenaries' performance and stability, and called it "clearly a game rushed out the doors and onto the shelves before it's ready." He also found fault with the game's multiplayer feature and artificial intelligence. However, Chick concluded, "In spite of these (considerable) drawbacks, Activision has done an admirable job taking their Mechwarrior engine to the next level."

Mercenaries won the 1996 Spotlight Award for "Best Simulation Game" from the Game Developers Conference.
