= Living Legend (attraction) =

Coordinates: 49.220°N 2.165°W

Living Legend was a tourist attraction in Jersey, consisting of a show detailing Jersey's history, an "adventure golf" course and a craft and shopping village. It did not re-open for the 2016 season after 24 years of operation.

== The Jersey Experience ==
The show, entitled "The Jersey Experience", consisted of three sections. The first was a section that visitors can walk around, set on a Victorian paddle steamer destined for St. Helier. It contained videos showing all the major events that occurred on Jersey during the previous century, a section on Jersey urban legends, and information on famous people who were born on or live on Jersey.

Visitors then entered the second section, which is made to look like a submarine. Here they were introduced to Jersey's maritime history by Captain Nemo, played by John Nettles.

Finally, visitors were invited to cross a drawbridge into a large cinema where they could witness a celebrity-packed show, featuring Tony Robinson, Roger Lloyd Pack, Brian Blessed, Samantha Janus, Kevin Whately and Stephen Tompkinson, who played key figures from the island's history. They were taken through from the creation of Jersey to the present day. The show was presented through various means such as videos, holograms, and moving models. To add to the experience, at one point wind blew through the theatre.

== Adventure Golf ==
Living Legend featured two 18-hole adventure golf courses, akin to a more advanced form of crazy golf, which it claimed was the first of its kind in Britain (although technically Jersey is not in Britain). Covering 3 acres (12,000 m^{2}), and based on similar courses in America, it incorporated caves, lakes and waterfalls. It was opened in 1997 by Ian Woosnam MBE and closed for the last time in 2015.

== Craft and Shopping Village ==
Living Legend also featured a craft and shopping village selling a wide array of products from jewellery to lace and ceramics.

== Closure ==
In 2015 the Jersey Living Legend closed its doors for the last time and did not re-open in the 2016 season. A statement on its website by Chris Lewis the Managing director said.

"Dear All,

After 24 years of trading we have decided to close.

We would like to thank all our millions of visitors (over the years) for their custom and support. We are so grateful; it has been an exciting adventure and a great pleasure! We would also like to thank Visit Jersey/Jersey Tourism, all our agents, partners and suppliers for their continued service and support. Finally, we would like to thank our fantastic staff for their loyalty, hard work, care, inspiration and dedication over past 24 years. It has been a great privilege working alongside you all. So many wonderful, memories. We have been truly blessed!

As for the future of the site, we are currently considering our options. In the meantime we will be focusing on our other tourism related businesses, Tantivy Coaches and the Seaside Café, Greve de Lecq.

Yours sincerely

Chris Lewis

Managing director"

== See also ==
- Miniature golf
