= Ediciones Zinco =

Former publisher in Spanish

Ediciones Zinco was a Spanish publisher based in Barcelona dedicated to the publication of literature and entertainment material, from coloring booklets or books intended for children to western novels and espionage, comics, role playing and board games. It is remembered above all for having translated and published in Spain, between 1982 and 1997, the comics of the American publishing giant DC Comics. The publisher definitively signed its closing balance in 1998.
