= BattleTroops =

1989 wargame

- Publishers: FASA Corporation
- Publication: 1989
- Players: 2
- Playing time: 90 minutes

BattleTroops is a board game of urban man-to-man combat published by the FASA Corporation and is part of the BattleTech universe.

It was expanded to include Clan Elementals with ClanTroops. It was published in 1989.
