= MechWarrior 2: 31st Century Combat =

1995 video game

- Developer: Activision
- Publisher: Activision (Note: Bandai Visual published the Japanese version of MechWarrior 2: Arcade Combat Edition for the PlayStation and Saturn (under the Emotion Digital Software label).)
- Director: John Spinale
- Producer: Josh Resnick
- Designers: Sean Vesce, Zachary Norman
- Writer: Zachary Norman
- Composers: Gregory Alper; Jeehun Hwang
- Series: MechWarrior
- Platforms: MS-DOS, Windows, Classic Mac OS, PlayStation, Saturn
- Release: MS-DOS; July 24, 1995; Windows; December 1995; Mac; July 1996; PlayStation, Saturn: NA: April 4, 1997; UK: April 11, 1997
- Genre: Vehicle simulation
- Modes: Single-player, multiplayer

MechWarrior 2: 31st Century Combat is a vehicle simulation game developed and published by Activision, released in 1995 as part of the MechWarrior series of video games in the BattleTech franchise. The game is set in 3057, and is played as a tactical simulation that incorporates aspects of real-time first-person combat and the physical simulation of the player's mech. It is a game recreation of the "Refusal War". The player can join one of the clans, Clan Jade Falcon or Clan Wolf, while engaging in up to 32 missions.

The game was originally developed for MS-DOS and was ported to Windows, Classic Mac OS, and the Saturn and PlayStation consoles as MechWarrior 2: Arcade Combat Edition. The console versions tweaked the game's mechanics to emphasize action over the tactical simulation of the original release. Several enhanced versions were released to use 3D graphics accelerator cards. The game has a pre-rendered introduction sequence produced by Digital Domain and its soundtrack was composed by Jeehun Hwang.

MechWarrior 2: 31st Century Combat received a follow-up expansion pack called MechWarrior 2: Ghost Bear's Legacy and a stand-alone expansion titled MechWarrior 2: Mercenaries. MechWarror 2 was critically well-received and its sales exceeded 500,000 copies within three months of its release.

== Gameplay ==
At the start of MechWarrior 2: 31st Century Combat, the player must join either Clan Wolf or Clan Jade Falcon, which are involved in the "Refusal War". The game's battles take place on fictional extrasolar planets that are named in the franchise's canonical media. Each battle has a goal such as search-and-destroy, reconnaissance or a base strike. Initially, the player controls one mech and in later missions has access to squad commands. Between missions, a mech lab allows players to customize the weapon, armor, engine and heat sinks of any drivable mech.

Fighting an enemy mech (DOS)

MechWarrior 2 is played as a tactical simulation that incorporates aspects of real-time first-person combat and the physical simulation of the player's mech. The player can choose between several control modes that range from a basic "point and shoot" mode to an advanced mode that allows the player to independently manage the legs and torso of the mech. The mech's on-board computer provides feedback ranging from the proximity of friendly and enemy forces to system damage and ammunition depletion to the player, who must carefully manage heat buildup. The mech's computer attempts to perform an emergency shutdown if heat levels rise too much but the player can override this. Rising temperatures caused by the repeated firing of weapons can cause ammunition explosions and damage to the mech, including the loss of limbs, actuators, and the catastrophic detonation of the mech's fusion engine. A version for Windows 95 includes NetMech software for player vs. player battles over a network or direct connection.

== Plot ==
MechWarrior 2: 31st Century Combat is set in 3057, shortly after the Battle of Tukayyid between the Inner Sphere and invading Clan armies. The plot revolves around an ideological conflict inside the Clans. It focuses on the Clans Jade Falcon and Wolf, which represent either Crusaders and Wardens, respectively. The Clans are the descendants of the Star League Defense Force, most of which was led by their commander Aleksandr Kerensky into the unknown regions of space in an attempt to prevent the warring nations of the Inner Sphere from obliterating each other. These forces eventually splintered and formed 20 groups called Clans, creating a society based around warfare and creating warriors for their advanced BattleMechs. During the years of isolation, two ideologies divided the Clans; Crusader Clans wished to return to the Inner Sphere as conquerors, forcing the nations to unite and recreate the Star League. The Warden Clans believed the Clans should act as protectors of the Inner Sphere, only intervening if a threat of sufficient magnitude was encountered.

Eventually, the Crusader faction won and the Clans returned to the Inner Sphere as an invasion force containing a small fraction of the clans including the Diamond Sharks, Jade Falcons, Ghost Bears, Nova Cats, Smoke Jaguars, Steel Vipers and Clan Wolf. The Warden faction, herein most prominent among the ranks of clans Steel Viper and Wolf, also participated in the invasion in an attempt to mitigate the damage caused by the Crusader faction. The invasion continued until the invading Clans were challenged by the ComStar organization to a fight on the planet Tukayyid. If the Clans won, they would gain control of Terra, which was controlled by ComStar; if they lost they would halt the invasion for 15 years under a truce. The Clans lost the battle and their invasion was halted for 15 years. In the wake of the defeat, Ulric Kerensky, the leader of the invasion and warlord of the Clans, as well as a staunch Warden and member of the Warden-leaning Clan Wolf, was charged with treason and accused of deliberately losing by the Crusader elements of his Clan. They claimed because Ulric was a Warden, he engineered the defeat to sabotage the invasion, and also accused him of genocide.

The basis of Clan law was "might equals right" so matters could be settled by combat. Ulric challenged the Crusaders to uphold his status within the Clan Council and, as a result, maintain the Truce of Tukayyid. The Jade Falcon Clan, the strongest of the Crusader Clans and historic enemy of Wolf Clan, took up the challenge. In the conflict, which became known as the Refusal War, the Jade Falcons fight to uphold the council's judgment of guilt, allowing an immediate resumption of the Invasion against the still-weakened Inner Sphere. Ulric and the Wolves, however, are determined to fight a war of extermination against the Falcons and weaken them so they cannot threaten the Inner Sphere.

== Development ==
MechWarrior 2 was originally planned for a release in October 1994 but development problems, including an almost-complete overturn of personnel in the development team, led to a series of considerable delays. The game was originally developed for MS-DOS but was ported to other platforms including Windows, Apple Macintosh, and the game consoles Sega Saturn and Sony PlayStation (as MechWarrior 2: Arcade Combat Edition). The MS-DOS, Windows, and Mac releases share the same gameplay but the console versions tweaked the game's mechanics to emphasize arcade-style action over the tactical-simulation of the original PC release. Several enhanced versions were released to take advantage of the 3D graphics accelerator cards at the time. Its soundtrack was composed by Jeehun Hwang and its rendered introductory sequence was produced by Digital Domain.

The Saturn and PlayStation versions were developed by Quantum Factory. Project coordinator Brian Clarke said they were adapting the game to appeal to a console gaming audience, adding: "Instead of doing a sim game, we're making the crossover into a console type game, where it's more action-oriented and fast paced, and also doing things like adding power-ups so it's more of an arcade experience. We're also adding more enemy mechs to each mission so there's a certain carnage element to the whole thing."

Neither the Saturn nor PlayStation version is a port of the other; the code for each version was built from the ground up. All 32 missions from the PC version were included in the console versions, though some were shortened to maintain a fast pace. These versions also include 16 new missions. According to producer Murali Tegulapalle, the team considered including missions from the Ghost Bear's Legacy expansion and MechWarrior 2: Mercenaries but decided because those missions were designed with a PC gaming audience in mind, it would make more sense to design new missions in keeping with the console versions' overall philosophy of offering a more fast-paced experience than the PC version.

Activision was also developing a version of MechWarrior 2 for the Panasonic M2, but this version was never released due to the cancellation of the system.

Gregory Fulton began his career in the video game industry as a tester on MechWarrior 2, and later served as the lead game designer of Heroes of Might and Magic III.

== Expansion packs ==
=== MechWarrior 2: Ghost Bear's Legacy ===
MechWarrior 2: Ghost Bear's Legacy is the follow-up expansion pack for MechWarrior 2 that was released in November 1995. The expansion pack allows players to play as Clan Ghost Bear and gives access to 14 new BattleMechs, some new weapons, twelve new missions and some new environments, such as outer space and underwater. It also adds new songs to the soundtrack. If players complete the 12 missions of the regular campaign without being killed or failing one mission, they enter a five-mission competition for a "bloodname".

=== MechWarrior 2: Mercenaries ===
MechWarrior 2: Mercenaries was released in September 1996 as a stand-alone expansion to MechWarrior 2: 31st Century Combat; it is the last BattleTech game made by Activision. In Mercenaries, players take control of an Inner Sphere mercenary squad, with control over finances and free choice of missions.

== Reception ==
Reception

Review scores
Publication	Score
Electronic Gaming Monthly	8.125/10 (PS1)
GameRevolution	A− (PC)
GameSpot	8.5/10 (PC); 6.6/10 (PS1); 7.0/10 (SAT)
Next Generation	4/5 (PC, PS1)
PlayStation Official Magazine – UK	9/10 (PS1)
PC Gamer (US)	93/100 (PC)
Maximum	5/5 (PC)
MacUser	3.5/5
PC Games	A−
Sega Saturn Magazine	89% (SAT)

Sales of MechWarrior 2 exceeded 500,000 copies within three months of its release. According to market research firm PC Data, it was the 12th-best-selling computer game in the United States for the year 1996, after claiming sixth in the rankings for the first half of the year.

MechWarrior 2 was critically well received. Maximum lauded the cut scenes, graphics, training section, customizable mechs, music, and sound effects, but concluded by saying: "If you put all this great quality stuff together, it's still hard to explain what it is that really makes MechWarrior 2 strut. It could be something to do with attention to detail and a sense of continuity which combine to create a feeling of completeness. The game feels confident, it feels deep." Next Generation called it "the best 'mech simulator currently available" making particular note of the rendered graphics and attention to detail in the game world. The reviewer complained at the fact that the initial release was single-player only, but noted that an add-on disk for networked multiplayer was due out by the end of the month. GameSpot praised the game for its high-resolution graphics and its requirement of strategy and planning from the player. The control complexity was likened to that of a flight simulator. GameRevolution also noted the controls were not overly complex for a simulation and that a throttle-control joystick was particularly intuitive. NetMech had some problems with stability and smoothness.

PC Gamer US named MechWarrior 2 the best action game of 1995, while Computer Games Strategy Plus declared it the year's top "sci-fi/fantasy sim" title. The editors of PC Gamer US wrote that "MechWarrior II has everything an action game needs—beautiful graphics; great sound effects; smooth animation, even at high resolution; lots of options; and tons of firepower—all set against the wonderfully rich background of FASA's Battletech universe."

In the third quarter of 1995, Activision reported up to an hour's wait time to talk to their game counselors, chiefly due to a flood of calls from gamers asking for MechWarrior 2 hints.

MechWarrior II won the Origins Award for Best Fantasy or Science Fiction Computer Game of 1995. In 1996, Computer Gaming World ranked it as the 27th best game of all time and called it "an amazingly immersive experience". That same year, it was also ranked as the 54th top game of all time by Next Generation. In 2000, Computer Games Strategy Plus named MechWarrior 2 one of the "10 Best Sci-Fi Simulations". The magazine's Steve Bauman wrote: "While subsequent games, whether it's the seemingly thousands of variations Activision released in its wake, or the more recent sequel, feature better graphics and production, this is the still the benchmark." In 2004, MechWarrior 2 was inducted into GameSpot's list of the greatest games of all time. Mech Warrior 2 was named one of the top 100 CD-ROMs by PC Magazine.

Jeff Gerstmann of GameSpot predicted the game's PlayStation version "will receive decidedly mixed reviews. Fans of the original will likely feel the game has been watered down to appease the younger-skewing console demographic." Instead, reviews were overwhelmingly positive, and many critics outright praised the way the adaptation from PC to console was handled. For example, GamePro remarked: "The term 'PC port' often makes console gamers wince because many PC titles suffer severely in the switch. MechWarrior 2 deftly avoids that pitfall, ditching the complexity of the classic PC sim in favor of gripping arcade-style mayhem." Next Generation said: "Activision finally releases a console version that does the MechWarrior series justice. MechWarrior 2 for PlayStation is a faithful recreation of the PC title, although a few modifications were made with the arcade-oriented console owner in mind. The combat arenas have been condensed to prevent unnecessary wandering around, and a non-campaign mode has been included for some quick, no frills fighting." Gerstmann himself, while criticizing the appearance of the exploding mechs and the music, concluded that "For those of you who want a quick-and-dirty combat simulator with a lot of things to shoot, and can get past the uninspired graphics, MW2 fits the bill nicely." Even Crispin Boyer of Electronic Gaming Monthly, one of the few to dislike the changes, summarized that "Although it has been dummied down a little from the PC original, Mech 2 is still one of the most complicated and rewarding sims you can play on the consoles-and it's definitely the best console mech game available."

The Saturn version received similar critical praise. Sega Saturn Magazine's Matt Yeo remarked: "Fans of the original PC game will find little to gripe about here, the game's much-heralded strategy elements having been retained ..." GamePro stated that aside from "slight differences in graphics and control", the Saturn version is the same as the PlayStation version.

== Soundtrack ==
The Mechwarrior 2 soundtrack received near-universal praise from game reviewers. The soundtrack was composed by Gregory Alper and Jeehun Hwang, and was said to create a new standard in video game music when it was released. The music is stored as standard audio CD tracks, allowing the music to be played on a standard audio CD player.
