= Take Off! =

- Players: 2-6
- Setup time: 5-10 min.
- Playing time: 60+ minutes
- Age range: 6+
- Skills: Geography, history

Take Off! is a board game designed to teach geography, first released in 1988. The game is developed by Resource Games.

== Game play ==
The game uses cards with blue cards representing the Western Hemisphere and brown ones representing the Eastern Hemisphere. Players use 8-sided dice with which to move their planes along colored lines depicted on the map, moving along lines that match the colors showing on the dice rolled. The dice also features a wild "Jet Facet" side, allowing a player to ride on any line regardless of color. A "Take Off!" face showing on the dice means a player draws a card and must move one of their planes to a country shown on the card. The players goal is to move from Hawaii all the way from the Eastern world to the Western world (or reverse).

== 15th anniversary ==
In 2002-2003, various board games have been produced that have been updated for the early 2000s period.

== Reception ==
The Vancouver Sun declared that the game is "Excellent for adults and children over the age of six."

The Ledger-Enquirer gave the game an overall grade of B and noted that "with geography a weakness of Americans and an emphasis in schools, Take Off! has added appeal."

Take Off! was recognized in 1992 as one of the Canadian Toy Testing Council's Top Ten Award winners out of 1,500 evaluated toys and games.

Resource Games noted that by 1999, more than 250,000 copies had been sold.
