= BattleTechnology =

The logo of BattleTechnology magazine.

BattleTechnology is a magazine that was published irregularly between 1987 and 1995 by Pacific Rim Publishing Company dedicated to BattleTech, a tabletop game of futuristic combat published at the time by FASA Corporation. The magazine includes game scenarios, optional rules, technical specifications for BattleMechs and other units, historical and current events in the fictional BattleTech universe, and short fiction, all of which was approved by FASA. The magazine is considered an official source of optional materials for the game.

BattleTechnology has an 8.5" x 11" format and generally includes about 60 pages per issue. Its subtitle is, "the magazine of combat in the 31st century."

== Publications ==
Twenty-one issues of BattleTechnology were published, as well as two special editions — The Lost Issues and The Early Years. The first six issues, printed in 1987 and 1988, are numbered 0101, 0102, 0201, 0202, 0203 and 0204; subsequent issues use normal sequential numbering (7-21).

The first 12 issues are collected into a set known as BattleTechnology: The War Years. Issues 13 through 21 are known as BattleTechnology: The Time of The Clans.
