= MechWarrior: Dark Age =

Tabletop wargame

- Designers: Kevin Barrett; Paul Nobles; Matt Robinson; Kelly Bonilla
- Illustrators: Sandra Garavito; Ethan Pasternack; Kevin Perrine; Vic Bonilla
- Publishers: WizKids
- Years active: 2002–2008
- Genres: Science Fiction; Collectable Miniatures Game (CMG)
- Players: 2–4
- Playing time: 60 Minutes
- Age range: 10+

MechWarrior: Dark Age (MWDA; later as Age of Destruction or AOD) was a tabletop wargame by WizKids set in the BattleTech universe that uses the Clix system. The game's miniatures are pre-painted models of infantry squads, vehicles, and giant walking war machines known as BattleMechs or more simply "'mechs".

Mechwarrior: Dark Age is played on a 36" x 36" game surface with each player taking turns giving his units "orders" that involve moving or attacking opposing units. A measuring tape and three six-sided dice are used while executing these orders. Frequently miniaturized "terrain", such as buildings (blocking terrain), forests (hindering terrain), or lakes (shallow water), is placed on the game board. The victor is determined after one or more "victory conditions" have been achieved by a player or when the predetermined time limit for the game has been reached, depending on the game scenario that is being played.

The game may be purchased in booster packs (similar to Magic: The Gathering). There are units that players can only acquire through trade or send-aways, such as the Battle forces and the Designer Series Mechs and pilots. From August 2002 to August 2003, WizKids organized story-based campaigns wherein it was possible for players to win units based on the factions named in the story. Such items – the Champion, Fellowship, and two Participation units (one for each faction) – are unique versions of certain game pieces with higher stats and a special lapel pin.

There are several factions to collect, and many are interconnected by alliances and other relations. Many of the factions from Classic Battletech were introduced into the game and the game has several original factions as well. In keeping with the spirit of the Battletech universe, there are also many mercenary units referred to as Gunslingers.

In 2003, MechWarrior: Dark Age won the Origins Awards for Best Illustration 2002, Best Science Fiction or Fantasy Miniatures Series 2002 and Game of the Year 2002. In 2005, WizKids updated MechWarrior: Dark Age. In conjunction with a rules overhaul, the game was renamed MechWarrior: Age of Destruction. In early 2008, WizKids announced that MechWarrior franchise will be put on hiatus until further notice. No new announcements about the franchise future were made other than a new novel based on the franchise was due to be released on November 19, 2008. On November 10, 2008, Topps announced the closure of Wizkids.

== Factions ==
=== New Factions ===
- Republic of the Sphere / RotS
- Northwind Highlanders – Part of the RotS
- Stormhammers
- Dragon's Fury
- Swordsworn
- Bannson's Raiders
- Spirit Cats
- Steel Wolves
- Wolf Hunters

=== Original Factions ===
- Capellan Confederation
- Lyran Alliance
- Federated Suns
- Clan Wolf
- Clan Nova Cat
- Clan Jade Falcon
- Clan Hell's Horses
- Clan Sea Fox (formerly known as Clan Diamond Shark in BattleTech)
- Highlanders
- Draconis Combine
- Rasalhague Dominion (formerly known as Ghost Bear Dominion)
- Comstar

Over time, these factions have acquired their own particular style of play. For example, the repairability of the Bannson's Raiders units allows the player to conduct quick strikes followed by a retreat. Three factions (House Liao, Clan Jade Falcon, and Clan Sea Fox) have inherent abilities not stated on their figures to compensate for higher point costs. Examples of these abilities include improved damage to elite or novice-ranked units, better targeting through forests, improved jumping attacks, or gaining the ability to deprive an enemy player of an order. This concept has been extended in later expansions by the addition of faction pride cards and special pilot abilities. Starting with the release of the Domination expansion set in January 2006, the faction abilities for House Liao, Clan Jade Falcon, and Clan Sea Fox were replaced with faction pride cards. However, the three factions' figures released before that set can still use the team abilities without having to require a faction pride card.

MechWarrior: Age of Destruction introduced new rules and new mechanics to the game, most notably the pilots and gear. These cards are included with the booster packs, and improve any 'Mech they are attached to, depending on the weight class. This has also introduced Gunslingers, mercenary pilots with preferred 'mechs that can be "recruited" to all, or most, factions. They have become common prizes at sanctioned tournaments.

Many of the older factions have been absorbed into their larger Houses or Clans, starting with the Firepower expansion in May 2005. For example, the Swordsworn were absorbed by House Davion, and the Stormhammers were absorbed by House Steiner. The Steel Wolves faction "evolved" into their own mercenary group known as Wolf Hunters with the introduction of Clan Wolf into the game.

== Sets ==
=== Dark Age Sets ===
- Dark Age (August 2002) – The original set, available as a starter pack and boosters.
- Fire For Effect (February 2003) – Introduction of artillery, transports, and mercenaries.
- Death From Above (May 2003) – Adds VTOLs and AA defense systems. Republic of the Sphere and Stormhammers introduced as playable factions.
- Liao Incursion (September 2003) – House Liao becomes playable faction. Introduction of faction abilities.
- Counterassault (January 2004) – Introduction of positive heat dial modifiers.
- Falcon's Prey (August 2004) – Last Dark Age set. Clan Jade Falcon introduced as regular faction.

=== Age of Destruction Sets ===
- Age of Destruction (January 2005) – Available as a starter pack with revised rules and units.
- Firepower (May 2005) – Introduces House Kurita and mail-in offer 'Mechs as part of tie-up with Wizard Entertainment.
- Annihilation (November 2005) – Introduces Clan Nova Cat; last expansion with Dark Age splinter faction units.
- Domination (January 2006) – Rasalhague Dominion becomes playable faction, as well as Wolf Hunters. Introduced the Officer's Club series of Mechs, featuring members of WizKids Mechwarrior design team, and purple-colored gear (PPC Capacitor, Artemis V Fire-Control System, Coolants, Reconnaissance, Anti-Missile System)
- Vanguard (May 2006) – RISC gear cards introduced (available in certain Unique mechs only). Last set with mail-in mechs.
- Wolf Strike (September 2006) – Clan Wolf becomes playable faction. Each booster box now has two mechs, one vehicle, two infantry pieces, two pilot cards, two gear cards, and a random card, including the new "squadron cards." Last set with Officer's Club Mech. Was also infamous for having two Mechs that were never officially released by WizKids because three eBay sellers in Hong Kong auctioned copies of them, sans pilot cards, before their scheduled release. The Vindicated Warwolf was a planned mail-in offer for the novel Wolf Hunters by Kevin Killiany, and the Deception Vixen was slated as a tournament prize. As a result, WizKids has ruled that the two figures are not legal for tournament play.

=== Battleforce series ===
In early 2006, WizKids released the Battleforce series, which consists of pre-packaged sets of 'Mechs painted to represent normal service units from each major faction. They come with pilot cards that depict ranked pilots from the faction.

- Clan Jade Falcon (January 2006) – Contains 2 Shrikes, 2 Eyries, and 2 Gyrfalcons, plus pilots.
- Republic of the Sphere (May 2006) – Contains 2 Malices, 2 Mangonels, and 2 Nyxes, plus pilots.
- War College (Summer 2006) – This set was designed to help attract new players to the game. Contains a Unique Atlas and Marauder IIC mech and their pilots, plus a playmat, two sets of dice, and 18" tape measures. Only available at War College events.
- Ares 3-Pack (Debuted at GenCon 2006; general release September 2006) – This set marked the debut of the Colossus-Class Mechs. The robots and their accompanying gunner, pilot, and engineer cards are named after figures in Greek mythology. Their tripod shape is reminiscent of the alien robots in The War of the Worlds.
- Phantom War Battleforce Set (September 2006) – A product tie-in with the Nintendo DS game MechAssault: Phantom War, the set features units from House Steiner and Clan Hell's Horses. The Steiner side comprises a Raptor, Uziel, and the Unique Atlas "Unsterblich". The Hell's Horses are represented by a Unique Hellbringer (Loki) "Brimstone", a Timberwolf (Mad Cat; a revived sculpt from the Dark Age sets, but presented as a first model Mad cat, not a Mad Cat Mk II), and a Kit Fox (Uller).
- Poseidon (October 2006) – Contains the Ares Battlemech Poseidon and two infantry pieces, plus their cards.

=== Action Packs ===
In late 2006, WizKids announced that the blind booster pack format was over for MechWarrior: Age of Destruction and that they would switch to non-blind faction-specific "Action Packs" for all 2007 releases. The first Action Pack releases are:

- House Davion Action Pack (May 2007) – Contains 2 Atlas, 2 Templar, and 2 Enforcer III mechs with pilots for House Davion.
- Champions Vol.1 (June 2007) – Containing Ghost, Jupiter, Locust, and Mortis battlemechs with pilots based on the Top Four fellowship players of the 2006 MechWarrior Fellowship World Championships. A 'Fellowship' in Mechwarrior parlance can be loosely described as a sportsmanship award.
- Champions Vol.2 (July 2007) – Containing Raven, Griffin, Warhammer IIC, and Daishi battlemechs with pilots based on the top four champion players of the 2006 MechWarrior World Championships.
- MechWarrior: Solaris VII (August 2007) – the series features 24 Gunslinger mechs that do combat on the gaming planet of Solaris VII. The mechs, plus their corresponding pilots and equipment, are grouped together in every pack according to each of the four weight classes – Light (eight), Medium (six), Heavy (six), and Assault (four). Each pack contains a rulebook, a set of six target tokens, and a playmat that can be connected with those from the three other packs to form one giant arena map.
- Undead Lance (October 2007) – A set of Gunslinger units based on the Four Horsemen of the Apocalypse.
- Wolf's Dragoons Wolf Spiders Action Pack (November 2007) – Includes four heavy 'Mechs (Loki, Madcat IV, Vulture IV, and Thor) painted in the colors of the Wolf's Dragoons mercenary unit's Wolf Spiders battalion and their corresponding pilot cards, plus a Jaime Wolf pilot card.
- Wolf's Dragoons Gamma Regiment Action Pack (December 2007) – Includes two ’Mechs, three vehicles, and six infantry pieces of different models, plus a set of pilot cards.

Both the Wolf Spiders and Gamma Regiment sets have pilots with combat abilities that can be used in other mechs. Previous pilot abilities were only activated in the pilot's preferred Mech, due to the familiarity with the machine. In GenCon 2007 WizKids announced the production of a Solaris VII champions set, coinciding with the six Players who had won the Solaris VII Open Worlds Event hosted that year. However, due to issues in production, the Mechwarrior line was put on permanent hold status, and the Solaris VII Champion set was never produced. WizKids did however, create a set of custom mechs based on existing sculpts for the six Champions, they are the only known Solaris VII Champion mechs produced, but did not come with pilot cards.

=== DropShip ===
In 2003, WizKids produced a special DropShip playset. Sold only at conventions and through special promotions, the Aurora DropShip is a massive unit that has five cannon turrets and four bays for repairing units. The playset also has special rules.

== Novels ==
The MechWarrior: Dark Age game also shares its name with its companion series of novels. As of July 2008 there are 30 novels in the MechWarrior: Dark Age series.

== Reviews ==
- Pyramid
- Syfy
