= BattleTech =

Wargaming and military science fiction franchise

Former BattleTech logo

BattleTech is a wargaming and military science fiction franchise launched by FASA Corporation in 1984, acquired by WizKids in 2001, which was in turn acquired by Topps in 2003; and published since 2007 by Catalyst Game Labs. The trademark is currently owned by Topps and, for video games, Microsoft Gaming; Catalyst Game Studios licenses the franchise from Topps.

The series began with FASA's debut of the board game BattleTech (originally named Battledroids) by Jordan Weisman and L. Ross Babcock III and has since grown to include numerous expansions to the original game, several board games, role playing games, video games, a collectible card game, a series of more than 100 novels, and an animated television series.

== Gameplay ==
In its most basic form, BattleTech is played on a map sheet composed of hexagonal terrain tiles. The combat units are roughly 12-metre-tall (39 ft) humanoid armored combat units called BattleMechs, powered by fusion reactors and armed with a variety of weapons. Typically, these are represented on the game board by two-inch-tall miniature figurines that the players can paint to their own specifications, although older publications such as the first edition included small scale plastic models originally created for the Macross TV series, and the 2nd and 4th edition boxed sets included small cardboard pictures (front and back images) that were set in rubber bases to represent the units. The game is played in turns, each of which represents 10 seconds of real time, with each turn composed of multiple phases.

== Setting ==
Battletech Timber Wolf miniature

BattleTech's fictional history covers the approximately 1,150 years from the end of the 20th century to the middle of the 32nd. Most works in the series are set during the early to middle decades of the 31st century, though a few publications concern earlier ages. MechWarrior: Dark Age and its related novels take place in the mid 3100s.

A detailed timeline stretching from the late 20th century to the mid-32nd describes humanity's technological, social and political development and spread through space both in broad historical terms and through accounts of the lives of individuals who experienced and shaped that history, with an emphasis on (initially) the year 3025 and creating an ongoing storyline from there. Generally, BattleTech assumes that its history is identical to real-world history up until approximately 1984, when the reported histories begin to diverge; in particular, the game designers did not foresee the fall of the Soviet Union, which plays a major role past 1991 in the fictional BattleTech history. Individual lifestyles remain largely unchanged from those of modern times, due in part to stretches of protracted interplanetary warfare during which technological progress slowed or even reversed. Cultural, political and social conventions vary considerably between worlds, but feudalism is widespread, with many states ruled by hereditary lords and other nobility, below which are numerous social classes.

A key feature of the BattleTech universe is the absence of non-human intelligent life. Other than one or two isolated encounters in novels, mankind is the only sentient species.

Above all, the central theme of BattleTech is conflict, consistent with the franchise's wargaming core. Interstellar and civil wars, planetary battles, factionalization and infighting, as well as institutionalized combat in the shape of arena contests and duelling, form the grist of both novelized fiction and game backstories.

The level of technology evident in BattleTech is an unusual blend of the highly futuristic and the nearly modern. The universe leans towards hard science fiction concepts. Much of the technology is either similar to that of the present day, or considered plausible in the near-future, such as the railgun. There are exceptions such as faster-than-light travel and communication, without which the setting cannot function. Radically advanced tech mixes with seemingly anachronistic technologies such as internal combustion engines and projectile weapons. Artificial intelligence, nanotechnology, androids, and many other staples of future fiction are generally absent or downplayed. Incessant warfare is generally blamed for the uneven advancement, the destruction of industry and institutes of learning over the centuries of warfare having resulted in the loss of much technology and knowledge. As rivalries and conflicts have dragged on, advanced technologies are redeveloped for the battlefield.

== History ==
=== Conception ===
Chicago-based FASA Corporation's original 1984 game focused on enormous robotic, semi-humanoid battle machines battling in a science-fiction feudalistic Dark Age setting. The game was at first called Battledroids. The name of the game was changed to BattleTech in the second edition because George Lucas and Lucasfilm claimed the rights to the term "droid"; the machines themselves were renamed BattleMechs from the second edition onward.

The game components included:

- First edition: two full-color terrain maps, 48 stand-up BattleMech counters, four sheets of playing markers, plastic counter stands, dice, and a rule book.
- Third edition: two color maps, a pack of record sheets, and fourteen 2" plastic miniatures of various BattleMech war machines.
- Fourth edition: two rule-books, a booklet of record sheets, 48 stand-up playing pieces, and a sheet of 144 insignia stickers.

=== Illustrations and imagery ===
Rather than create their own original robot art, FASA decided to use already-extant designs that had originally been created for a variety of different Japanese anime, including Dougram, Crusher Joe, and Macross. The rights to these images were licensed from Twentieth Century Imports (TCI). In later years, FASA abandoned these images as a result of a lawsuit brought against them by Playmates Toys and Harmony Gold over the use of said images.

The anime-sourced BattleMechs continued to be referenced in-universe, but their images were no longer seen in new sourcebooks. This led them to be termed by fans as "the Unseen". When Fantasy Productions licensed the property, these "Unseen" images were expanded to include all art produced "out-of-house" – that is, whose copyrights resided with the creators, not the company. Catalyst Game Labs has continued this practice.

=== Expansions ===
The game's popularity spawned several variants and expansions to the core system, including CityTech which fleshed out urban operations, infantry, and vehicle combat, AeroTech which focused on air and space-based operations, and BattleSpace which detailed large spacecraft combat. FASA also published numerous sourcebooks, known as Technical Readouts, which featured specifications for new combat units that players could select from. However, despite the large number of such pre-designed BattleMechs, vehicles, aerospace units and other military hardware, the creators also established a system of custom design rules, enabling players to generate their own units and field them in combat. In addition to game rule books, FASA published several background books detailing the history, political and social structures of various factions in the game, including all five Great Houses of the Inner Sphere, ComStar, the Periphery states and the fallen Star League.

FASA launched two additional systems to complement the core game: BattleTroops, an infantry combat system, and BattleForce, a large-scale combat simulator governing the actions of massed BattleTech units. The Succession Wars, a board game released in 1987, is one of only two purely strategic titles of the series (the other being "The Inner Sphere in Flames" from the Combat Operations book). The Succession Wars is played on a political star map, with players trying to capture regions of space.

Recent years have seen a trend of consolidating the expansions into "core products" for efficiency. Beginning under FanPro's aegis, then continued under Catalyst Game Labs, the various rulesets have been combined into a series of Core Rulebooks:

- Total Warfare (TW) integrates the original boardgame with CityTech, BattleTroops, and parts of AeroTech 2 (itself a consolidation of AeroTech and BattleSpace) pertaining to atmospheric operations (such as simplified rules for Dropship operations, and the use of AeroTech Fighters in atmospheric combat).
- Tactical Operations (TO) supplements Total Warfare with rules for expanded game-play (advanced rules). These include an expanded weapons / equipment table listing (Lostech), advanced unit types (such as "mobile structures", planetary fortresses, and "large support vehicles") as well as numerous optional gameplay enhancements for planetary-level conquests (consolidating Maximum Tech and other expansion packs, like Explorer Corps).
- Strategic Operations (SO) consolidates the rules for multi-game campaigns within a single star system (such as unit morale and management, repair and maintenance, equipment salvage, in-game construction, and unit-level economics) with the remaining AeroTech 2 rules omitted from TW. These include the introduction of capital-level spacecraft (Jumpships / Warships / Space Stations / Fighter Squadrons) and equipment, space warfare rules, and the use of space travel as a gameplay element. A revised version of BattleForce is also consolidated into the book.
- TechManual (TM) consolidates the customization rules with technical fluff from various products for units compliant to Total Warfare rules. (Construction rules for the missing units are listed in TO or SO, as these units are not considered to be "tournament legal" for gameplay).
- Interstellar Operations (IO) was originally a project that had been available in beta form. The book was designed to introduce rules for faction-wide operations (such as entire Clans / Succession Houses / Empires) across multiple campaigns and star systems—up to and including the entire Inner Sphere. The book itself would have also included an expansion of additional technologies which stipulated per time period in the game universe's history, including revised rules for more advanced types of vehicles such as Land-Air 'Mechs, Superheavy BattleMechs, and unique period technologies. The size of the materials slated for the book forced its splitting into two volumes; the second, which was initially known as the Campaign Companion, was renamed.
- Campaign Operations (CO) is the self-contained companion book to Interstellar Operations. The book provides core rules handling player campaigns, using different rules sets. Taking older legacy rules found in previous source books, CO presented them in a singular core rulebook for better accessibility for the player. Included in the publication are rules to build environments for players to create and maintain combat units to be played in the game universe and rules allowing them to design their own worlds and star systems if desired.
- BattleMech Manual is an alternative Core Rulebook to Total Warfare. Unlike Total Warfare, the Battlemech Manual ignores all elements of combined operations, instead presenting concise and developed rules for playing games of Battletech focused exclusively on BattleMechs fighting against Battlemechs. The book is marketed as "table usage friendly" and serves as a complete, standalone game experience for players who want a single book for Mech focused combat.

=== After FASA ===
After the FASA Corporation closed in 2000, Wizkids bought the rights to the game in January 2001. They reworked the IP to launch their MechWarrior: Dark Age collectible miniatures game, but licensed the rights to continue to publish products for the old game to FanPro (itself a subsidiary of Fantasy Productions). Topps bought Wizkids in 2003, but this did not change any publishing agreements at that time. FanPro held the license to the original tabletop game (which they rebranded as "Classic BattleTech") until 2007. At that point Catalyst Game Labs (CGL) acquired the license from Topps. CGL continues to hold the license to this day; with the end of the MechWarrior: Dark Age miniatures game, the name of the traditional tabletop game has reverted to simply BattleTech.

On June 24, 2009, Catalyst Game Labs announced that they had secured the rights to the "Unseen" art. As a result, art depicting the original 'Mechs could be legally used again. However, an update on August 11, 2009, stated that the part of the deal regarding designs that originated in images from Macross had fallen through, returning the original images to Unseen status once again. Since then, designs that originated in images from Dougram and Crusher Joe are no longer considered Unseen.

=== Kickstarters ===
In 2019 Catalyst Game Labs launched the Battletech: Clan Invasion crowdfunding campaign on Kickstarter. To match its modernization effort around the rules of Battletech, with the Clan Invasion campaign Catalyst Game Labs aimed to update the designs and physical models of a number of classic Battlemechs with modern, plastic kits. While initially the campaign sought only a minimum of $30,000 in funding, over its 30-day funding period $2,586,421 was raised. This success led to Catalyst Game Labs launching a second crowdfunding campaign in 2023. The Battletech: Mercenaries campaign focused on combined arms, updating a number of vehicle designs with plastic models in addition to more Battlemechs. The second campaign nearly tripled the amount raised by its predecessor, totalling $7,549,241 pledged in its 30-day funding period.

== Reception ==
In the March 1988 edition of Dragon (Issue 131), Jim Bambra called the first edition BattleTech tabletop game "a brilliantly conceived and presented game of robotic combat set in the war-torn universe of the Successor States", and complimented the high production values of the game components. Bambra concluded with a recommendation: "Try the Battletech game. If you like it, it might inspire you to form your own BattleMech unit and battle your way across the Successor States."

In the June 1993 edition of Dragon (Issue 194), Rick Swan reviewed FASA's third edition and liked the rules revisions "presenting the fundamentals in clear, simple language". Swan also admired the game's post-apocalyptic vision, calling it "one of the hobby's richest settings." He concluded with a recommendation to buy the third edition: "While the previous version was a class act ... the third edition stands as the definitive treatment, a handsome upgrade worth the purchase price even for owners of the old editions."

In the August 1997 edition of Dragon (Issue 238), Rick Swan reviewed FASA's fourth edition of BattleTech, and called it "A snap to learn... as exciting as it is addictive; there are few gaming experiences more satisfying than blasting giant robots into scrap metal." However, for people who already owned the third edition, Swan suggested that "there's no compelling reason to invest in version four."

== Reviews ==
- Casus Belli #32 (Apr 1986)
- Casus Belli #45 (June 1988)
- Magia i Miecz (Issue 4 - 1993) (Polish)
- Jeux & Stratégie #51

== Spin-offs ==
The BattleTech franchise first extended beyond the tabletop wargame format with the release of MechWarrior, a role-playing game in which players portray BattleMech pilots or other characters in the 31st century. The RPG system has been republished in several editions and expanded by various sourcebooks and supplements. In 1996, FASA also introduced the BattleTech Collectible Card Game, a CCG developed by Wizards of the Coast, creators of the popular Magic: The Gathering.

WizKids, owners of the BattleTech franchise after 2001, introduced a collectable miniatures-based variant of the classic tabletop game called MechWarrior: Dark Age in 2002 (later renamed MechWarrior: Age of Destruction). The game incorporates WizKids' "Clix System", a means of tracking the combat statistics and abilities of each figure by turning a dial in its base.

BattleMechs, the hulking flagship units of the franchise, made a natural subject for computer emulation, and so in 1988 Infocom released a PC/Commodore 64/Amiga based RPG called BattleTech: The Crescent Hawk's Inception. It was later followed up with a sequel, BattleTech: The Crescent Hawk's Revenge in 1990. Both games were reasonably well received, although aside from storyline continuity the second game held few similarities to its predecessor. The first pure simulation of BattleMech combat, however, was released for computers in 1989. Titled MechWarrior and published by Activision, the single-player game gave users the opportunity to pilot a range of Mechs and engage in combat against computer-controlled opponents. Sequels MechWarrior 2 (1995), MechWarrior 2: Mercenaries (1996), MechWarrior 3 (1999) and MechWarrior 4 (2000), and MechWarrior 4: Mercenaries (2002) created simulations of progressively higher technical sophistication. "Mekpaks" for MechWarrior 4: Mercenaries made by Mektek were released, adding new weapons, Mechs and graphics. A group also modded Crysis for the release of a BattleTech game known as MechWarrior: Living Legends and the first public beta was released on December 26, 2009. A possible MechWarrior 5 was being produced, though it lingered in development for about a year and was eventually canceled. Originally, Smith & Tinker owned the BattleTech electronic rights, but, after failing to find funding for a new MechWarrior game, the rights to the series were bought by Piranha Games in 2011, who had originally been working with Smith & Tinker to create MechWarrior 5. On July 9, 2009, it was confirmed that the franchise would be rebooted. Further trailers were released and it was confirmed that the timeline would be set around 3015. Though it seemed that the legal troubles which originally plagued FASA due to the similarities between BattleTech mechs and those in Robotech/Macross had returned to cause some troubles for Piranha Games, the company later released a statement noting that their primary troubles had been with finding a publisher, which eventually led to the announcement of a free-to-play reboot called Mechwarrior Online, set around the start of the clan invasions. The game was published in 2013 by Infinite Games Publishing, the same company which later published MechWarrior Tactics. IGP filed for bankruptcy and sold off the rights in December 2014. Piranha Games continued work on MechWarrior 5: Mercenaries, was released as an Epic Games exclusive in December 2019. Piranha Games released a stand-alone sequel to MechWarrior 5: Mercenaries called MechWarrior 5: Clans on October 17, 2024.

The franchise saw its first online-dedicated game with Multiplayer BattleTech: EGA in 1992, which was followed by Multiplayer Battletech: Solaris in 1996. 1994 saw the series' first console original title, the simply titled BattleTech for the Sega Genesis. Other notable titles include the MechCommander series for the PC (MechCommander in 1998 and MechCommander 2 in 2001), the MechAssault series (MechAssault and MechAssault 2: Lone Wolf in 2002 and 2004, respectively, for the Xbox, and MechAssault: Phantom War in 2006 for the Nintendo DS). A new turn-based strategy game, simply titled BattleTech, was released in April 2018. The game was developed by Harebrained Schemes, and led by Jordan Weisman, the creator of the series.

== Magazines ==
BattleTech material appeared in various publications from other companies, ranging from articles in professional gaming magazines to fanzines devoted exclusively to the game. FASA provided some material to gaming magazines, allowed associated fan clubs like MechForce to publish newsletters, and treated some magazines like BattleTechnology as semi-official publications. Some of this material was treated as canon at the time and some of it, especially 'Mech designs, came to be used in official product.

An exhaustive list is impossible but more notable publications are listed below.

Magazines with some BattleTech articles:

- Challenge (Game Designers' Workshop) - #30, 35, 36, 38, 39, 44, 47, 48, 51, 54, 55, 60, 61, 67–70, 71, 73
- Dragon - issues #114, 144, 161–163, 166
- Mecha Press (IANVS) - issues #0, 1, 3, 4, 7–17
- The Space Gamer (Steve Jackson Games) - issues #75, 78–80, 83, 85
- Stardate (FASA/Associates International/Reluctant Publishing) - issues Volume 1 #5/6; Volume 3 #1-6
  - StarDrive a one-shot from Reluctant Publishing
- White Wolf - issues #7-10, 33, 41

Fanzines and magazines dedicated to BattleTech:

- BattleTechnology (Jeffry Tibbetts/Pacific Rim Publishing, 1987–1995, 23 issues) - had semi-official status and featured material from several writers of official BattleTech fiction.
- Commando Quarterly (FanPro Commandos, 7 issues, 2003–2006)
- Future Wars (Herb Barents, 42 issues) - 41 regular issues and a best-of
- Mech (MechForce North America, 1990–1995, 18 issues) - newsletter, replaced by MechForce Quarterly in 1995
- MechForce Quarterly (21 issues, 1995-?) - newsletter of MechForce North America
- Shrapnel (Catalyst Game Labs, 2020-) - ongoing digital house publication
- Magistracy Monthly (Riley Centrella, 2022-) - ongoing digital newsletter

== Other media ==
=== BattleTech Center ===
The BattleTech creators' goal of creating an immersive BattleMech simulation came about 1990 with the opening of the first BattleTech Center at the North Pier Mall in Chicago. The BattleTech Center featured 16 networked, full-sized cockpits or "pods" that resembled a BattleMech cockpit with over 80 separate controls. Each player selected a 'Mech to pilot into combat against up to seven other human players in the other cockpits. Virtual World Entertainment, the company that managed the centers, later opened many other Virtual World centers around the world. It later merged with FASA Interactive Technologies (FIT) to form Virtual World Entertainment Group (VWEG) in order to better capitalize on FASA's properties. In 1999, Microsoft Corporation purchased VWEG to integrate FIT into Microsoft Game Studios and sold VWE. VWE continues to develop and support the current BattleTech VR platform called the Tesla II system, featuring BattleTech: Firestorm. Members of the "pod" ownership community continue to update the software and hardware for the Tesla II cockpits (e.g., by developing kits that allow to replace the original CRT monitors with modern LCD ones) for both private, commercial, and convention use.

=== Tie-in fiction ===
- More than 100 tie-in novels. The novels are set in both the Classic BattleTech era (mid-3000s) and the Dark Age era (3130s). The original (Classic) BattleTech novels were produced between 1986 and 2002, while the "Dark Age Era" novels were produced from 2002 to early 2008. Publication of titles under the Classic BattleTech and MechWarrior lines resumed at the end of 2008.
- An online writing project named BattleCorps produces novelettes set in different eras. The subscription-based BattleCorps offers monthly stories set across the history of the fictional universe. As of mid-2017, no new stories have been released in the first two quarters of 2017.
- The Spider and the Wolf, a comic book-style sourcebook published by FASA in 1986 as a supplement to the original board game. It depicts the inception of the "Black Widow Company" in 3015 and offers a brief introduction to the BattleTech universe as a prelude on the inside cover. Three potential game scenarios are presented in the back of the book.
- A series of licensed comics, published in the late 1980s by Blackthorne Publishing under the BattleTech and BattleForce monikers. The BattleTech comics included an "annual" and a "3-D" special issue, while the third of the three-issue BattleForce comic was left unpublished. The comics are not officially dated, but due to real-life publication date and plot context, speculation suggests that setting is circa 3025.
- A five-issue comic book limited series based on BattleTech: The Animated Series, BattleTech: Fallout was published by Malibu Comics from 1994 to 1995. The series is set in early 3050 during the Clan Invasion and depicts a group of disparate fugitives pairing with the Belt Pirates. The two parties form an irregular BattleMech force to remove the Clans from the Star's End system. The first issue has two special editions, one with gold print ("gold edition") and one with a holographic cover. The fifth issue (titled "Issue #0"), offers three very short supplemental stories outside of the main plot of the comic.
- A 13-episode television show, BattleTech: The Animated Series, aired on Fox in late 1994. The show was produced by Saban Entertainment and followed Major Adam Steiner and his unit, the First Somerset Strikers in an ongoing conflict with Clan Jade Falcon.
- Electric Entertainment, a company under contract to Paramount Studios, has leased the rights to produce a motion picture based on the BattleTech universe. Development has been slow and little is known about the project's status.

== See also ==
- BattleTech Tactical Handbook
