= A Living Legend =

Studio album by Mother Maybelle Carter
- Released: 1965
- Recorded: 1964–65
- Genre: Country
- Length: 26:40
- Label: Columbia
- Producer: Don Law, Frank Jones

Mother Maybelle Carter chronology
Queen of the Autoharp (1964)	A Living Legend (1965)	Mother Maybelle Carter (1973)

A Living Legend is the fifth album by Mother Maybelle Carter.

== Track listing ==
Side one
No.	Title	Length
1.	"I Told Them What You're Fighting For"	2:54
2.	"Kitty Puss"	2:01
3.	"Charlie Brooks"	3:04
4.	"San Antonio Rose"	2:06
5.	"We All Miss You Joe"	2:18
6.	"Black Mountain Rag"	1:56

Side two
No.	Title	Length
7.	"A Letter From Home"	2:30
8.	"Tom's Cat Kitten"	2:08
9.	"Let's Be Lover's Again"	3:02
10.	"Give Me Your Love And I'll Give You Mine"	2:39
11.	"There's A Mother Always Waiting"	3:09
