= Guillotine (1987 game) =

1987 board game

Guillotine is a 1987 board game published by Avril et Floréal.

== Gameplay ==
Guillotine is a game in which a strategic game of the French Revolution has players lead parliamentary factions, negotiate and betray, and strive to keep the most members alive after 10 rounds.

== Reviews ==
- Casus Belli #44
- Casus Belli #45
- Jeux & Stratégie #49
