= MechWarrior (role-playing game) =

Science fiction tabletop role-playing game

The BattleTech Role Playing Game
- First edition cover, 1986
- Publishers: FASA Corporation, Fantasy Productions LLC
- Publication: 1986; 40 years ago
- Genres: Science fiction

MechWarrior is a set of role-playing game rules published by FASA Corporation in 1986 that were designed to be used with FASA's previously published mecha wargame BattleTech.

== Description ==
MechWarrior is the role-playing system set in the same fictional universe as the wargame BattleTech. Players assume the roles of MechWarriors (BattleMech pilots) or other individuals in the 31st century.

Character generation is quite long, as the entire life of the character from childhood through school, training and into adult occupations and skills is determined.

== Publication history ==
There have been three editions and many expansions and adventures, the first of which was published in 1986 by FASA Corporation. In addition, numerous novels by such authors as Michael A. Stackpole flesh out the game's fictional world. There is also an animated series.

=== Editions ===
- MechWarrior: The BattleTech Role Playing Game (FASA Corporation, 1986)
- MechWarrior: Second Edition (FASA Corporation, 1991)
- MechWarrior: Third Edition (FASA Corporation, 1999)

- Reprinted as Classic BattleTech RPG (FanPro, 2006). To reduce confusion between WizKids' MechWarrior: Dark Age games and the MechWarrior roleplaying game, FanPro renamed this reprint as Classic BattleTech RPG.

- BattleTech: A Time of War (Catalyst Game Labs, November 2010)

- Reprinted November 2022.

- MechWarrior: Destiny (Catalyst Game Labs, June 2020)

- "MechWarrior: Destiny is a new, alternative fast-play BattleTech RPG... [it] represents an additional option for BattleTech role-playing rather than a replacement for AToW".

=== Translations ===
==== Finnish ====
The first edition of MechWarrior was translated into Finnish by Meyer Richards and Jaakko Mäntyjärvi for the Finnish publishing house Pro-Games, a successor of Protocol Productions. The game was published on 1991 under the title Mechwarrior: Battletech roolipeli.

==== French ====
The first edition of MechWarrior was translated into French by Michel Serrat for the French publishing house Hexagonal. Serrat's translation was published in 1989 under the title of Technoguerriers, which loosely translates the original English title.

==== Japanese ====
Fujimi Shobo published a translation of MechWarrior in 1993. It was supported by the scenario collection Tamar and four replays.

==== Spanish ====
In Spain the two first editions of the game were translated into Spanish and published: the first edition in 1990 by the nowadays defunct Diseños Orbitales publishing house and the second edition in 1994 by Ediciones Zinco, also defunct. Both publishing houses were from Barcelona.

== Reception ==
In Issue 78 of Space Gamer/Fantasy Gamer, Scott Tanner commented, "I found this supplement very useful, for not only did it provide a roleplaying side to the game, but the background material was useful in setting up scenarios and the like."

Stephan Wieck reviewed Mechwarrior in White Wolf #7 (1987), rating it a 6 out of 10 and stated that "Mechwarrior is by far not the best roleplaying game on the market, but it is adequate. It is the weak point of a very good and enjoyable system."

In Issue 58 of the French games magazine Jeux et Stratégie, Pascal Gros noted "From the point of view of 'playability', no problem if you are an old hand at role-playing games and at the same time a fan of these robot-war machines. The rules are detailed, coherent and complete." However Gros didn't think role-playing was really the point of the game, saying, "The very definition of a role-playing game is only skimmed ... in our opinion, it's more of a super wargame with custom tokens than a real role-playing game." Gros gave the game a "likeability" rating of only 1 out 3.

In his 1990 book The Complete Guide to Role-Playing Games, game critic Rick Swan noted that "Role-playing seems like an afterthought, as player characters exist mainly to pilot the giant machines." Nonetheless, Swan found the game "features intelligent, streamlined rules for creating characters." Swan gave the game a solid rating of 3 out of 4.

In a 1996 reader poll conducted by the British games magazine Arcane to determine the top 50 role-playing games of all time, MechWarrior was ranked 49th. Editor Paul Pettengale commented: "Over the years since its original release, FASA has developed every aspect of the background and history of the Battle Tech setting. The result is a detailed universe overflowing with potential for adventure."

The German games magazine Envoyer liked the lengthy character generation system, commenting, "By means of a 'life path' system, the characters are gradually taken through their early and late childhood, their apprenticeship period and finally the 'seriousness of life' phase. It's a lengthy, but all the more rewarding method of creating a hero; you are rewarded by the fact that every player character has a complete background story from the beginning ... and thus your own character is 99.9% of their own personality instead of being another 'street samurai' version 1.0 clone." Envoyer also liked the many empty worlds that could be customized with flora and fauna by the gamemaster. There were some problems with the German translation, especially the complete lack of artwork that had been present in the English edition. The review conclude on a positive note, calling the game, "a mature, easy-to-learn role-playing game, with well-planned and elaborate game worlds, and yet almost unlimited possibilities for creating new worlds that adventure-making allows. If you like realistic science fiction and avoid Shadowrun because of its rules, this is your game!"

== Reviews ==
- G.M. The Independent Fantasy Roleplaying Magazine #2

== See also ==
- The Periphery, a supplement to the game
- Living Legends (MechWarrior)
- Royalty and Rogues
