= MechWarrior 2: Ghost Bear's Legacy =

Expansion pack to MechWarrior 2

- Developer: Activision
- Publisher: Activision
- Designer: Chad Findley
- Writer: Sacha Howells
- Composer: Jeehun Hwang
- Series: MechWarrior
- Platforms: DOS, Windows
- Release: December 1995 (DOS); June 1996 (Windows)
- Genre: Vehicle simulation game
- Mode: Single-player

MechWarrior 2: Ghost Bear's Legacy is an expansion pack to MechWarrior 2: 31st Century Combat.

== Gameplay and story ==
MechWarrior 2: Ghost Bear's Legacy is the follow-up expansion pack for MechWarrior 2 that was released in November 1995. The expansion pack allows players to play as Clan Ghost Bear and gives access to 14 new BattleMechs, some new weapons, twelve new missions and some new environments, such as outer space and underwater. It also adds new songs to the soundtrack. If players complete the 12 missions of the regular campaign without being killed or failing one mission, they enter a five-mission competition for a "blood name".

Ghost Bear's Legacy takes place after the Refusal War, and is the story of a new Ghost Bear warrior living in the Inner Sphere who initially repels raids by mercenaries but is enraged when the Draconis Combine steals the genetic material of the Clan founders Hans Ole Jorgensson and Sandra Tseng. The Ghost Bears send units to track down the culprits but find the matter is more complex than they first thought. The Draconis Combine has been framed for the raids and the BattleMechs used in the raid were captured by Clan Smoke Jaguar several months before. A search through the Clans for the culprit ensues.

It is found the Smoke Jaguars lost the BattleMechs in a raid by Clan Wolf. After the Refusal War, the Wolf Clan divided into the Crusader faction under Khan Vlad Ward and the Warden faction. Sending units to investigate, it is soon discovered the Jade Wolves, two rogue Galaxy Commanders of the Crusader Clan Wolf, stole the material in the fake raid. The Wolves allow the units sent to investigate Clan Wolf in Exile to honorably withdraw and the stage is set for the final battle.

== Reception ==
Shane Mooney for PC World said "some of these tough missions are well thought out and involve strategy as opposed to having you just wander around blowing away any mech unfortunate enough to cross your path".

German magazine Power Play gave the game 87%.

Florian Strangl for PC Player gave the game 80%.

Martin E. Cirulis for Computer Gaming World magazine issue #139 gave the expansion pack 4 out of 5 stars, citing the pros as "a good story, 14 new Mech designs, new weapons from the Battletech universe, and new environments." and the cons as "combat physics in the new environments don't seem entirely realistic. The new career track probably won't pose a long-term challenge to experienced players.". Overall, Cirulis concluded that "Ghost Bear's Legacy is still a damn good expansion package, one that actually fleshes out the Battletech universe for computer gamers, rather than just delivering "more of the same". The Bear's bellowing roar is worthy to take its place with the Falcon's angry cry and the Wolf's Noble howl."

== Reviews ==
- The Adrenaline Vault - Feb 05, 1999
- PC Multimedia & Entertainment - Jan 15, 1996
- Computer Games Magazine - Jan 18, 1996
- GameSpot - May 01, 1996
- High Score - Apr, 1996
- Excalibur - Mar, 1996
- Level (Czech)
