= BattleForce =

1987 wargame

- Designers: L. Ross Babcock III, Cory Glaberson, Jordan Weisman
- Publishers: FASA Corporation
- Publication: 1987
- Players: 2–20
- Playing time: 120 minutes

BattleForce is a board game created by the FASA Corporation and is part of the BattleTech universe.

It is wargame designed to allow the simulation of larger-scale actions. Units typically represent lances, but there are provisions for allowing the counters to represent larger units/formations, such as companies, battalions, and so forth.

Normal BattleTech game play usually is set up for small encounters (up to 12 units per side). Though large battles are possible using the normal games rules for BattleTech, playing the game can consume much time. BattleForce was designed to address this problem.

The game allows wide use of units (vehicles, Battlemechs, air vehicles, etc.).

== Revision and revival ==
In 2006, BattleTech was relaunched, revising and reprinting many its rule sets under the name of the BattleTech: Total Warfare rule set. A supplementary rulebook called Strategic Operations includes several chapters for revised and updated edition of BattleForce and its successor Battleforce 2. New units have been added to BattleForce game (including new units added to BattleTech since its launch, including Large Naval Vessels). While BattleForce's elements appear in Interstellar Operations which will be a component of large scale combat operations on interstellar scale (Solar System to Solar System vs planetary operation which BattleForce is originally conceived for).

== Basic rules ==
In its simplest description the game of BattleForce is still a tactical level game comparable to BattleTech, but on a slightly larger scale. Individual vehicles still retain statistics to track, but are much simplified over the normal game of BattleTech.

For example, in BattleTech a BattleMech combat robot is tracked internally for 8 locations and for exterior armor in 11 locations, but in the game of BattleForce there is a pair of stats for armor and internal structure as a whole, both of which are usually single digit numbers between 1 and 9.

Combat units are grouped together and move together in small units rather than independently.

There are also far less complicated rules for movement and for variables like terrain and movement's effect on weapon accuracy.

== Reviews ==
- G.M. The Independent Fantasy Roleplaying Magazine #2
