= MechWarrior: Living Legends =

- Developer: Wandering Samurai Studios
- Series: MechWarrior
- Engine: CryEngine 2
- Platform: Microsoft Windows
- Release: 2009
- Genre: Vehicle simulation
- Mode: Multiplayer

Mechwarrior: Living Legends (also known as MW:LL or MWLL) is a free, fan-created multiplayer-only game based in the BattleTech universe - originally a total-conversion mod for Crysis, it's since become stand-alone - running on Crysis Wars, and using CryEngine 2 as its engine. It's one of the few mods based on the BattleTech universe (and its supporting Intellectual property) to have been sanctioned by Microsoft—who currently (as of 2011) owns the rights to the Mechwarrior video-game franchise—and additionally received pre-SDK support and sanctioning directly from Crytek, producers of the games' engine. On December 26, 2009, an open beta (version 0.1.0) was released via BitTorrent and other distribution methods. Because the project changes the play-style and feel of the game it is originally based on (Crysis and Crysis Warhead) so completely as to be unrecognizable in comparison, it is billed as a "full-conversion" mod, since little to no trace of the original game's art or play-style (besides the most basic menus seen when first loading the game) exists any longer within MW:LL. It was created by American developer Wandering Samurai Studios.

== History ==
Mechwarrior: Living Legends is based in the BattleTech universe and began as a mod for Quake Wars. However, for a number of reasons, the team decided to switch to Crysis and continue development on the CryEngine 2. Not long after the switch, German Crysis developer Crytek announced that the team would be one of only four to receive the Crysis Software Development Kit (SDK) in advance.

On Friday October 28, 2016 a new development team, unaffiliated with Wandering Samurai, released a 0.8.0 version of the game.

Since the community team took over development, Mechwarrior: Living Legends has received a number of new playable mechs, vehicles and aircraft as well as maps, in addition to significant gameplay and balance changes. As of August 2022, the game is in version 0.15.3.

== Gameplay ==
MW:LL is a multiplayer-only game with no single-player mode. As such, it has no specific story and does not seek to establish canon. However, it is loosely set during the Clan Invasion of 3050-3061, with the playable teams being the Inner Sphere and the invading Clans. With some exceptions, the majority of playable assets are from this era in BattleTech canon.

The game is limited strictly to the first person point of view, and focuses largely on vehicular combat, including the franchise hallmark BattleMech. Additionally, it is the first game in the MechWarrior series to allow players to operate a wide range of vehicles in addition to 'Mechs; Battle-Armor, tanks, hovercraft, VTOLs, and aerospace fighters.

Each 'Mech, ground vehicle and aircraft chassis (asset) has multiple variants to choose from, sporting different weapon and equipment loadouts - determining their combat roles, effectiveness and capabilities in a given scenario.

Players must manage their asset's heat, ammo and damage in combat. Most energy weapons (lasers) are hit-scan and tend to build the most heat, but do not require ammunition - while Ballistic and Missile weapons fire projectiles, with a limited ammunition pool and generally producing less heat per damage, with some notable exceptions. Overheating can cause an automatic shutdown, which can be overridden at risk of causing severe damage or outright destruction to the asset. Maps have different ambient temperatures, as well as environmental features such as bodies of water or lava, all of which can effect an asset's cooling.

Each asset is divided into several different hitboxes - For mechs; the Center, Rear, Left and Right torsos, Left and Right legs, Head, and any external pods. Tanks have front, back and side panels, as well as their turret and internals. Aircraft have the body, wings, tail and engine. Arms and external pods on mechs, as well as wings on VTOLs and Aerospace fighters can be destroyed, along with any weapons carried in them - these are not replaceable through repairs. Mech side-torsos can also contain weapons, but if destroyed they can be fully restored. Destruction of the turret on tanks and hovercraft reduces its turn rate, but does not disable its weapons. The rear torso on mechs, and rear panel on tanks, contains the asset's engine - severe damage to these will reduce their top speed. Mechs can be mobility-killed by destroying one leg, or by severely damaging both legs. Destruction of the center torso for mechs, internals for tanks and hovercraft, or body for aircraft will destroy the asset.

=== Gamemodes ===
Mechwarrior: Living Legends offers five game modes. In each, the player will spawn as Infantry equipped with Battle Armor (BA), and is able to purchase an asset if they spawn at a factory - or weapons for their BA at these and all other spawnpoints - using the C-Bills they spawn with. By dealing damage, destroying enemy assets, capturing control points and using certain electronics systems, players earn more C-Bills in their current life - and progress towards the next rank, enabling them to respawn with more C-Bills. Team-based modes can be played in "PureTech" mode - restricting players on the Inner Sphere and Clan teams to their respective faction's assets.

==== Terrain Control ====
In Terrain Control (TC), similar to the Battlefield series' Conquest mode, the objective for each team is to capture and maintain control of several capture points spread across the map, in order to drain the opposing team of their Tickets. Each team starts with 625 Tickets, and each player starts off with 43,000 C-Bills - enough to choose from a small selection of light mechs and vehicles. Player deaths, the destruction of enemy assets, and controlling a majority of capture points, will bleed the opposing team's tickets. Some capture points may feature factories, from which players can buy mechs and vehicles, while others may be worth more in terms of their effect on ticket bleed.

Each asset has a specific ticket value, with heavier mechs and vehicles costing more upon destruction. Upon a team reaching 0 tickets, dead players will be unable to respawn, and a 3-minute timer begins. If both teams reach 0 tickets, the team with the most players alive at the end of the 3 minutes wins. If the round timer runs out before either team reaches 0 tickets, the team with the most tickets remaining wins.

==== Solaris Arena ====
Solaris Arena (SA) is a free-for-all deathmatch mode, with most maps being set on Solaris VII - A planet famous for its gladiatiorial Solaris games. George Ledoux reprises his role from Mechwarrior 4: Mercenaries as Duncan Fisher, a Solaris announcer, providing commentary during gameplay.

==== Team Solaris Arena ====
Team Solaris Arena (TSA) is a team-based deathmatch mode, and can be played on most TC maps. The objective for each team is to destroy as many tickets' worth of enemy assets as possible.

==== Test of Strength ====
Test of Strength is similar to TSA, however players start with a finite number of C-Bills, and have no way of earning more.

==== Practice ====
In practice mode, players spawn with a large amount of C-Bills and can give themselves as much as they require, in order to test out all the game's playable assets.

== Reception ==
In 2010, MechWarrior: Living Legends was declared the winner of Mod DB's 2009 Players' Choice - Mod of the Year contest. As of August 2022, MW:LL is rated 9.5/10 based on 528 reviews.

In 2014, it was named by PCGamer among the "Ten top fan remade classics you can play for free right now".

== Sequel ==
In 2021 it was announced that a sequel titled 'Living Legends 2: Armored Combat' was in production, dropping the "MechWarrior" title. Living Legends 2 is being developed as a standalone title on Unreal Engine 5. As of 2025 this project has been shelved due to a lack of programming resources.
