= MechAssault: Phantom War =

2006 video game

- Developer: Backbone Entertainment
- Publishers: WW: Majesco; AU: Eidos Interactive
- Designer: Dan Mueller
- Programmer: Chris Larkin
- Artist: Kevin James
- Composers: Joshua Podolsky; Jesse Stern; David Levison
- Series: BattleTech
- Platform: Nintendo DS
- Release: NA: September 12, 2006; EU: June 29, 2007; AU: August 3, 2007
- Genre: Action
- Modes: Single-player, multiplayer

MechAssault: Phantom War is an action video game that is part of the MechWarrior series and part of the BattleTech universe created by FASA. Players assume the role of a BattleMech pilot in a 3D environment with a third person view of the combat via the top screen of the DS, while the touch screen displays the inside of the cockpit and acts as the game's controls.

== Story ==
Still involving the struggle between the Houses and the Clans within the Inner Sphere, players assume the role of recently administered Mech Warrior Vallen Brice, an expert hacker and Tech Warrant who has been assigned a difficult mission. For the past sixty years, the planets among the Republic of the Sphere have been unable to communicate with each other as each planet's Hyperpulse Generators have been afflicted with a computer virus, rendering each Generator inoperable. Rumors spread throughout each House on the planets that the Hyperpulse Generators may be re-established as weapons during their inoperable state. The Lyran Alliance is the first to act on this rumor and the first to try shut it down by sending Vallen into combat to hack into each Hyperpulse Generator and ensure none of them are used for destructive purposes.

== Reception ==
Reception

Aggregate score
Aggregator	Score
Metacritic	66/100

Review scores
Publication	Score
Electronic Gaming Monthly	4.5/10 (Note: Three critics of Electronic Gaming Monthly gave the game each a score of 4/10, 6.5/10, and 3/10.)
Game Informer	7.75/10
GameSpot	7.1/10
GameSpy	1.5/5
IGN	7/10
Jeuxvideo.com	11/20
NGamer	65%
Nintendo Life	4/10
Nintendo Power	8/10
Pocket Gamer	3.5/5
411Mania	7/10

MechAssault: Phantom War received "average" reviews according to the review aggregation website Metacritic. The game received praise for its FMV cutscenes and voice acting. Common criticisms include lack of online play, lackluster graphics, shortness of the single player campaign, and issues with the game mechanics.
