= Shadowrun (disambiguation) =

Shadowrun is a pen and paper role-playing game, first released in 1989.

Shadowrun may also refer to:

- Video games based on the role-playing game:
  - Shadowrun (1993 video game), a 1993 video game for the Super NES
  - Shadowrun (1994 video game), a 1994 video game for the Sega Genesis
  - Shadowrun (1996 video game), a 1996 video game for the Sega Mega-CD
  - Shadowrun (2007 video game), a 2007 game for the Xbox 360 and Windows Vista
  - Shadowrun Returns, a 2013 game for Windows, OS X and Linux, iOS and Android
  - Shadowrun: Dragonfall, a 2014 game for Windows, OS X, Linux, iOS and Android
  - Shadowrun Chronicles: Boston Lockdown, a 2015 game for Linux, Windows, OS X, Android, iOS and Ouya
  - Shadowrun: Hong Kong, a 2015 game for Windows, OS X, Linux
- Shadowrun: The Trading Card Game, a 1997 collectible card game
- Shadowrun Duels, a 2003 collectible miniatures game
- Other uses:
  - Shadow Run (film), a 1998 crime film based on the novel The Shadow Run
