= Cyber Knights: Flashpoint =

- Developer: Trese Brothers
- Publisher: Trese Brothers
- Platforms: Windows, MacOS, Linux
- Release: January 5, 2022 (Early access); June 2, 2025 (Full release)
- Genre: Turn-based tactics
- Mode: Single-player

Cyber Knights: Flashpoint is an indie turn-based tactics video game developed and published by Trese Brothers, developers of the 2018 Star Traders: Frontiers. It was funded on Kickstarter in 2020, its alpha version was launched in early access on January 5, 2022, and the game saw a full release on June 2, 2025 for Windows, MacOS and Linux. The game revolves around a gang of mercenaries in a cyberpunk world, who are hired to attack rival gangs or corporations to steal things.

== Development ==
The game was developed by Philadelphia-based studio Trese Brothers. It is based on an original cyberpunk tabletop gaming setting created by the Trese brothers, and which had been "tinkered with" over a decade. Andrew Trese described it as trying to avoid "rehashing tropes redundant to the real world", such as the "idea that technology or money are inherently dehumanizing".

== Reception ==
In 2022, Donovan Erskine of Shacknews published impressions of the game's demo, comparing it to XCOM and saying that he was "excited to experiment with different builds and combat strategies" in the full release. In 2023, Mikhail Madnani of TouchArcade reviewed the game positively in early access, saying that it had "the potential to be amazing" despite rough edges. Saying that it "excels with how it blends heists, turn-based strategy, and builds", he called it "the perfect game to play if you miss the likes of Shadowrun Returns". He described the game as playing "brilliantly" on Steam Deck, though noting issues with interface scaling in which text and menus overlapped or were cropped if increased in size. He summed up the game as "well worth keeping an eye on". In 2023, Katharine Castle of Rock Paper Shotgun described the game as a spiritual successor to Invisible, Inc. 2024, Sin Vega of the same publication criticized the game's lack of context and brief tutorial when starting out, saying that it "does not lead with its best foot". While describing its world and character design as generic, Vega nevertheless said that it was worth recommending with caveats, praising the developers' decision to delay the game until 2025.
