= Dex (video game) =

- Developer: Dreadlocks Ltd
- Publisher: Dreadlocks Ltd
- Designer: Jan Jirkovský
- Programmers: Michal Červenka; Jaroslav Meloun
- Writers: Jan Jirkovský; Morris Stuttard; Axel Droxler
- Composer: Karel Antonín
- Engine: Unity
- Platforms: Linux, OS X, Windows, PlayStation Vita, Xbox One, PlayStation 4, Nintendo Switch
- Release: Linux, OS X, Windows; May 7, 2015; PlayStation Vita; December 20, 2016; Xbox One; July 8, 2016; PlayStation 4; July 12, 2016; Nintendo Switch; July 24, 2020
- Genre: Action role-playing
- Mode: Single-player

Dex is a 2015 side-scrolling action role-playing game developed and published by Dreadlocks Ltd. The game was crowdfunded on Kickstarter, and was released in 2015.

== Gameplay ==
Gameplay screenshot

Dex is a 2D side-scrolling platform game focused on exploration and non-linear gameplay, more like a Role-playing game. The player controls the eponymous character, Dex, and receives quests from NPCs. Every quest has multiple possible solutions and it is up to player which of them to choose.

The player receives experience points for every quest completed or enemy killed. Experience points grant skill points that can be invested into the character's skills. Skills include fighting, shooting, hacking, and lock-picking.

== Plot ==
The story follows Dex, a young woman living in Harbor Prime. Harbor Prime is a city controlled by corporations that are integrated into a secret authority known as the Complex. Dex becomes a target of the Complex that sends its assassins to her. Dex is saved by a hacker known as Raycast who guides her to safety. Raycast reveals that Dex is the "fragment of Kether." Kether was the supreme Artificial Intelligence program created by the Complex. It was shut down when the Complex lost control of it. Dex becomes part of the resistance against the Complex.

== Development and release ==
The game was announced at the Game Developers Session 2012 and originally scheduled to be released in 2013. In late 2012, developers started a Kickstarter campaign, which started on November 12 when the studio asked for £14,000. The amount was reached a week later and in the end the game was pledged £30,647. On November 4, 2012, Dex was greenlit for Steam.

The first build of Alpha version was released an Early Access on August 14, 2014. It featured a limited amount of quests and locations. The second build was released three months later, featuring more quests, locations and characters. The Beta was released on April 1, 2015, adding almost all features intended for the final release, including the story, and was published only in Steam Beta Build. The final version was released on May 7, 2015.

A physical version produced by publishers PQube and BadLand Games for the PlayStation 4 console was released on July 29, 2016.

== Reception ==
Reception

Aggregate score
Aggregator	Score
Metacritic	(PC) 62/100 (XONE) 69/100 (PS4) 67/100 (Vita) 49/100 (NS) 72/100

Dex received mixed reviews upon its release. Arcade Sushi praised the gameplay system which "combines expressive 2D sprites and nostalgic platforming with some grade-A, modern action-RPG." It also praised the story and its familiarity to Deus Ex and Shadowrun. On the other hand, the save system was criticised as was the journal system. The review also mentioned some minor bug, but was overall positive and called Dex a "solid game worth investment." Czech website Zing praised the atmosphere of the game world and the story along with the soundtrack. Side-quests that include possibility to make a decision also gained praise. However, it criticised the number of bugs and noted that Dex should have stayed in Early Access for a bit longer. Dex won the Czech Game of the Year Award for artistic contribution to Czech video game output in 2014.

Website Games.cz voted Dex the best Czech video game developed in 2015. They noted that the game would not have been nominated for the title at release due to the high number of bugs that spoiled the experience, but Dreadlocks had released multiple bug-fixing and game-improving updates since then. The review noted that after these updates Dex "is the undisputed best title" among Czech games of 2015. Game Obscura also praised the Enhanced Edition, saying "it's a must play for the fans of cyberpunk RPG games."

The console version has received more positive reviews than the PC version. It holds a 69% rating on Metacritic. Elias Blondeau of CGMagazine praised the story and gameplay. He called Dex "the absolute best Ghost in the Shell game we've ever gotten." Digitally Downloaded compared Dex with The Technomancer. It praised Dex for its gameplay but criticised narrative. Lauren Relph praised the art design and the inspiration from various cyberpunk sources such as Blade Runner. Another praise was for story and well-acted characters. Relph on the other hand criticised the combat and hacking mechanics. Relph concluded her review: "A modest and enjoyable game, with a selection of great characters, and a storyline often giving pause for thought. Dex is a solid project, clearly put together with love. While its combat mechanic and hacking are lacking, the majority of the experience is deep and interesting." ZTGD published a negative review which criticised the combat, story and controls. He also noted performance issues with the Xbox One version. His conclusion was: "Dex just never stood out enough for me. The generic and clichéd story left me cold, and the technical issues made the game hard to like. However, it is worth noting that the various performance issues I encountered on the Xbox One were not present on the PC version. So if you feel like you need to check Dex out and have the ability to do so, get it on PC. It doesn't differ much in general, but at least it will be slightly more pleasant to play." Brandon Marlow wrote another negative review. He praised the game's world and story, noting interesting characters and places; but he criticised its gameplay which he called a "dull affair."
