= Mimpi (disambiguation) =

Mimpi is a compilation album by Indonesian singer Anggun.

Mimpi can also refer to:

- Mimpi (video game), an indie video game by Silicon Jelly
- "Mimpi" (Danell Lee song), a 2005 single released by Daniel Lee Chee Hun
- "Mimpi" (Isyana Sarasvati song), a 2016 single by Isyana Sarasvati
