= Dreadlocks (company) =

Czech video game developer

Dreadlocks Ltd
- Company type: Private
- Industry: Video games
- Founded: 2011; 15 years ago
- Headquarters: Prague, Czech Republic
- Key people: Michal Červenka (CEO & CTO)
- Subsidiaries: Dreadlocks Mobile s.r.o.
- Website: dreadlocks.cz

Dreadlocks Ltd is a Czech video game developer based in Prague. The company's first game, Rune Legend, was the winner of the 5th AppParade. The company was officially formed in 2011. The company's most recent release is Dex, an action role-playing game.

== History ==
Dreadlocks was established in 2011 by a group of students from Czech Technical University in Prague. The idea of forming a studio was based on a game engine created by them for their bachelor work. Their first project was Rune Legend, a mobile game that was released in 2012. The studio then focused on creating a game titled Enlightened, but its development was suspended when the company acquired a team that worked on the video game Dex, which was successfully funded through Kickstarter and released in May 2015.

Ghost Theory, a horror ghost hunting game, was announced at the Game Developers Session 2015 and was scheduled to be released in Q4 2017. In April 2016, the crowdfunding project went live on Kickstarter. In January 2019, the project stalled as the developers have made a game engine switch from Unity to CryEngine. Dreadlocks underwent financial problems after failing to get funding from Crytek's Indie Development Fund. The studio decided to focus on smaller projects to fund the further development of Ghost Theory.

== British subsidiary ==
The company also has a United Kingdom subsidiary which is based in Northampton that serves to help with legal issues and an earlier availability of certain technologies or services to British developers. An example is a Kickstarter campaign for Dex.

== Mobile division ==
In May 2017, Dreadlocks acquired Silicon Jelly, the team responsible for the Mimpi video game series. Silicon Jelly became Dreadlocks Mobile.

== Games ==
All games by Dreadlocks Ltd.
Title	Year	Platform(s)	Genre	Description
Rune Legend	2012	Windows Phone	Puzzle	Puzzle game with story inspired by Norse mythology
Dex	2015	Linux	Action RPG	Cyberpunk action RPG game
Dex	2015	Ouya	Action RPG	Cyberpunk action RPG game
Dex	2015	OS X	Action RPG	Cyberpunk action RPG game
Dex	2015	Windows	Action RPG	Cyberpunk action RPG game
Dex	2016	Xbox One	Action RPG	Cyberpunk action RPG game
Dex	2016	PS4	Action RPG	Cyberpunk action RPG game
Dex	2016	PS Vita	Action RPG	Cyberpunk action RPG game

=== Developed by Dreadlocks Mobile/Silicon Jelly ===
All games by Dreadlocks Ltd
Title	Year	Platform(s)	Genre	Description
Mimpi	2013	Windows	Platform Adventure game	Side-scrolling platformer with elements of adventure game
Mimpi	2013	Android	Platform Adventure game	Side-scrolling platformer with elements of adventure game
Mimpi	2013	iOS	Platform Adventure game	Side-scrolling platformer with elements of adventure game
Mimpi	2013	OS X	Platform Adventure game	Side-scrolling platformer with elements of adventure game
Mimpi Dreams	2015	Windows	Platform Adventure game	Sequel to Mimpi
Mimpi Dreams	2015	Android	Platform Adventure game	Sequel to Mimpi
Mimpi Dreams	2015	iOS	Platform Adventure game	Sequel to Mimpi
Mimpi Dreams	2015	OS X	Platform Adventure game	Sequel to Mimpi
