= Nightshade (1992 video game) =

1992 video game

- Developer: Beam Software
- Publisher: Ultra Games
- Designer: Pauli Kidd
- Writers: Pauli Kidd; Jef Kamenek
- Composer: Marshall Parker
- Platform: Nintendo Entertainment System
- Release: NA: January 1992
- Genre: Action-adventure
- Mode: Single-player

Nightshade, entitled Nightshade Part 1: The Claws of Sutekh onscreen, is a 1992 action-adventure game developed by Beam Software and published by Ultra Games for the Nintendo Entertainment System. The game was meant to be the first part in a series, but no sequels were ever made; however, it served as the basis for Beam Software's video game adaptation of Shadowrun.

It was released on the Nintendo Switch for the Nintendo Classics service in December 2020.

== Plot ==
The game takes place in a fictional urban city called Metro City. As the story unfolds, the city's local superhero named Vortex is outnumbered by gangs and killed. With the city's protector murdered, crime grows rapidly. Soon enough, the city's crime lords start fighting over control of the city, until a villain named Waldo P. Schmeer (more commonly known as Sutekh) takes control, combining all the gangs into one. With the city completely overrun by Sutekh and the other crime lords (Rat King, Goliath, Lord Muck, and Ninja Mistress), it is soon devoured in crime. A vigilante named Mark (alias Nightshade) decides to step up and take the law into his own hands, vowing to rid Metro City of crime.

== Gameplay ==
The game had a unique feature; along with the action sequences and point-and-click game elements, there was a "popularity meter" that would go up or down as Nightshade performed good deeds well or poorly. Higher popularity meant greater recognition by everyday citizens of Metro City and allowed Nightshade access to more areas.

The game also included fighting segments that required quick button responses.

== Development ==
According to Pauli Kidd, who served as the director, writer and lead designer, she was not allowed to put a battery-backed ROM to allow save files. To work around this issue, Kidd and the other developers decided that Sutekh would throw Nightshade into a deathtrap, inspired by various James Bond movies.

Kidd spoke on the genesis of the title stating "We had been commissioned to do an adventure game, these guys wanted a gumshoe, 1930s, film noir kind of thing...on the last day I hooked up with a very talented programmer called Jef Kamenek...we took a look and thought yeah this is fine but it lacks something so we sat down together and said why don't we do this as a comedy ? So what I did was rewrite all the dialog as comedy dialog"

The first four traps each had a solution and Nightshade would escape back onto the streets of Metro City (minus some popularity points). The final one does not, and the player would have to start over from the beginning of the game. Additionally the game begins with Nightshade tied to a chair, next to which Sutekh has placed a small bomb. While technically not a deathtrap (the bomb, if not escaped on time, does not do lethal damage) this introduces the trap-escape/problem-solving element early on.

== Reception ==
Reception

Review score
Publication	Score
Electronic Gaming Monthly	7/10, 8/10, 4/10, 5/10
