= Mus of Kerbridge =

Book by Pauli Kidd

- Mus of Kerbridge first edition cover.
- Author: Pauli Kidd
- Cover artist: Jennell Jaquays
- Language: English
- Genre: Fantasy
- Publisher: TSR
- Publication date: May 1995
- Publication place: Australia
- Media type: Print (Paperback)
- OCLC: 9780786900947

Mus of Kerbridge is a 1995 fantasy novel by Pauli Kidd.

== Premise ==
It follows the story of a mouse called Mus who, after being changed into an intelligent humanoid version of his species able to talk, has been sent to spy on the princess of Kerbridge only to help her fight against the warlady of the South. It is set in the same world detailed in the Lace & Steel RPG.

== Background ==
Mus of Kerbridge was first published in the United States in May 1995 by TSR, Inc. in paperback format. In 2007 it was republished at Lulu. It was a short-list nominee for the 1995 Aurealis Award for best fantasy novel but lost to Garth Nix's Sabriel.

== Reviews ==
- Review by Carolyn Cushman (1995) in Locus, #411 April 1995
- Review by Jonathan Strahan (1995) in Eidolon: The Journal of Australian Science Fiction and Fantasy, Winter 1995
- Review by Fred Patten (1995) in Yarf! The Journal of Applied Anthropomorphics #37
- Review by Fred Patten (2008) in Anthrology Two, (2008)
