= Rune Legend =

2011 video game

- Developer: Dreadlocks Ltd
- Publisher: Dreadlocks Ltd
- Designer: Václav Sahula
- Programmer: Michal Červenka
- Artist: Alena Bendová
- Composer: Karel Antonín
- Engine: XNA
- Platform: Windows Phone 7
- Release: Windows Phone 7: WW: December 30, 2011
- Genre: Puzzle
- Modes: Single-player, multiplayer

Rune Legend is a Windows Phone 7 puzzle game developed by Dreadlocks Ltd with the game's setting being inspired by Norse mythology.

== Gameplay ==
The player places differently shaped rune stones on the game board. Their goal is to place the different shaped rune stones on the board to completely fill the game board in. When the game board is filled in, the level is completed. In the story mode of the game, the player earns a unique rune stone after completing each level. The game also features the swift time mode or multiplayer mode and various challenges to accomplish.

== Features ==
- 6 different game modes
- Unlimited generated mode
- Optional difficulty
- Background story based on Norse legends
- 24 collectible rune stones with magical powers
- Detailed graphics

== Awards ==
- Winner of 5th App Parade

== Availability ==
The full version of Rune Legend is available on Microsoft Store, an online game market, for $0.99.
