= Shadowrun (2007 video game) =

2007 video game

- North American Windows Vista cover art
- Developer: FASA Interactive
- Publisher: Microsoft Game Studios
- Designers: John Howard; Sage Merrill; Derek Carroll
- Artist: Evan Marc Hirsch
- Series: Shadowrun
- Platforms: Xbox 360, Microsoft Windows
- Release: NA: May 29, 2007; EU: June 1, 2007; AU: June 14, 2007
- Genre: First-person shooter
- Mode: Multiplayer

Shadowrun is a first-person shooter video game, developed by FASA Studio for Xbox 360 and Windows Vista. The game was inspired by the role-playing game of the same name, and features a buying system inspired by the game Counter-Strike.

== Gameplay ==
Shadowrun's multiplayer consists wholly of a first-person/third-person deathmatch. Players choose various races with unique abilities. Additionally, a currency system dictates in-match upgrades, with each race given a different amount of starting capital. The four playable races are Human, Elf, Dwarf, and Troll. Magic is a key component to this game. Players can heal, damage, teleport, and summon to gain advantages over others. Additionally, gadgets, or "tech", are obtainable through currency. Currency also allows players to purchase new weapons.

Shadowrun features no campaign mode. If a user is without online services, they can set up bot matches and hone their skills.

== Plot ==
According to the ancient Mayan calendar, magic is cyclical, leaving the world and returning every 5000 years. Magic enters the world, grows, peaks, and eventually retreats. When magic was last at its peak, a powerful Ziggurat was constructed near what would be modern day Santos, Brazil. The purpose of this construct is shrouded in the mists of history. Even the Chancela family, who secretly maintained the ziggurat for thousands of years, did not know its purpose, nor did they know the purpose of the strange artifact somehow connected to the ziggurat. In the millennia since its construction, the ziggurat was eventually buried, hidden in the side of a mountain. Then, on December 24, 2012, magic began returning to the world, leaving change and confusion in its wake.

The years after magic's return wrought change on a global scale. RNA Global, a powerful multinational corporation, sent a research team to Santos, Brazil. Their job was to explore and research the strange energies coming from a mountainside along one edge of Santos. Armed with an artifact from ancient times, the research team sought to channel and control the magical energies they were exploring. Instead, they caused a magical accident that destroyed half the city and brought down the mountainside, revealing the ziggurat to all. Deflecting blame for the incident to an Ork paramilitary organization, RNA retreated from the city while rethinking their strategy.

After a time, RNA Global returned to Santos, this time armed with a government contract that provided them control over the city. Vowing to keep the peace and clean up Santos, RNA's first actions were to enact martial law and declare a curfew for all citizens. The locals, still upset over the initial accident and trying to rebuild on their own, began resisting RNA's efforts. The resistance was helped greatly by the leadership of the Chancela family, who were dedicated to defending the ziggurat and recovering the artifact. Resistance turned to conflict, conflict turned to skirmish, and skirmish eventually plunged the city into all-out war. Eventually, forces began to organize themselves under the Chancela family, and became known as "The Lineage".

The battle between these two sides has grown to great proportions as of 2031, as the struggle for the artifact continues between RNA Global forces and The Lineage.

== Development ==
Three video games based on the Shadowrun universe were created throughout the 1990s: one for the SNES, one for the Sega Genesis, and one other for the Mega-CD (released only in Japan). In January 1999, Microsoft purchased FASA Interactive, acquiring the electronic rights to Shadowrun in the process. Microsoft then filed a trademark for the Shadowrun title in November 2004. Initial gameplay prototyping was done using the Halo: Combat Evolved engine while FASA Interactive worked on creating their own engine.

At E3 in May 2006, Microsoft officially revealed Shadowrun for Windows Vista and the Xbox 360. Originally, the game was set to have a single-player campaign to complement the multiplayer. FASA Studio's Bill Fulton later revealed the campaign mode was cut due to "resource constraints" and the "quality over quantity" focus of development.

== Release ==
On September 12, 2007, FASA Studio announced its closure. On January 7, 2008, it was announced that the dedicated servers hosted by Microsoft for PC users would be available until at least the beginning of February 2008, at which time plans for their future support would be evaluated. The official Shadowrun forums were closed on January 31, 2008, and the announcement also stated the Shadowrun.com domain name would soon be transferred to Smith & Tinker, the company which licensed the electronic entertainment rights for Shadowrun from Microsoft.

On December 15, 2009, the game was made available on the Games on Demand store for Games for Windows – Live, and was the second game to allow for Windows users to play with Xbox 360 users (the first being Final Fantasy XI in 2006). A Games for Windows – Live update released on November 15, 2010, changed the voice codec used by the platform. As a result, Shadowrun players on Windows and Xbox 360 can no longer hear each other in-game (though they can still hear other players on the same platform). It was later cracked to work on Windows XP, confirming speculation that it was intentionally limited to Windows Vista.

== Reception ==
Reception

Aggregate score
Aggregator	Score	
Aggregator	PC	Xbox 360
Metacritic	67/100	66/100

Review scores
Publication	Score	
Publication	PC	Xbox 360
The A.V. Club	C+	C+
Edge	6/10	6/10
Electronic Gaming Monthly	N/A	6.67/10 (Note: Three critics of Electronic Gaming Monthly gave the Xbox 360 version each a score of 5/10, 7/10, and 8/10.)
Eurogamer	6/10	6/10
Famitsu	N/A	(X360) 30/40; 28/40
Game Informer	6.5/10	6.5/10
GameRevolution	C+	C+
GameSpot	6.9/10	6.9/10
GameSpy	2/5	2/5
GameTrailers	6.9/10	6.9/10
GameZone	6.9/10	7.5/10
IGN	6.8/10	(US) 6.8/10 (AU) 5.5/10
Official Xbox Magazine (US)	N/A	7/10
PC Gamer (US)	76%	N/A
Digital Spy	N/A	3/5

The game received "mixed or average" reviews on both platforms according to the review aggregation website Metacritic. In Japan, where the Xbox 360 version was ported for release on June 21, 2007, Famitsu gave it a score of 28 out of 40, while Famitsu X360 gave it a score of one seven, two eights, and one seven for a total of 30 out of 40.

Vicious Sid of GamePro said of the Xbox 360 version, "For $30 or $40, Shadowrun would be a worthwhile online shooter, even if it is a little rough around the edges. As it stands, it's hard to make a glowing recommendation about a $60 game that includes virtually no offline mode, lacks variety in its weapons and match types, and suffers from rookie blunders in terms of presentation and interface. It all points to a rushed, chaotic development cycle." (Note: GamePro gave the Xbox 360 version 3.75/5 for graphics, two 3.5/5 scores for sound and control, and 3.25/5 for fun factor.) A little later, however, Brian Newton said of the PC version, "Those able to play Shadowrun with an open mind and invest the time to learn the game will find one of the deeper online FPS games to date. The fine-tuned balance of the numerous powers and technology throws a spin on the usual formula. It may not be for those looking for a simple pick up and play experience, or those who aren't willing to push past its initial barriers. For everyone else, though, there is an experience here well worth the cost of entry that becomes more interesting the more you play and will last quite a while." (Note: GamePro gave the PC version 4/5 for graphics, two 4.25/5 scores for sound and fun factor, and 4.5/5 for control.)

On June 22, 2007, FASA Studio head Mitch Gitelman provided an in-depth 40 minute interview, on the podcast KOXM, regarding the game and its critical reviews. He defended the pricing over the long term value of gameplay compared to other first-person shooters:

The most important thing is the value of what you're getting, I think there is value there at the $60 price point. If you play just about any first person, next-generation shooter that's come out recently, you're looking at the single player game being about 10 hours. I've been playing Shadowrun for three years... You can see this game truly has legs. So, ten hours of gameplay for sixty bucks, plus some probably-lame multiplayer they tacked on, versus Shadowrun that you can play, let's say, for years.

=== Sales ===
As of July 31, 2007, the game sold roughly 162,000 units in North America according to NPD Group with 150,000 being sold on the Xbox 360 and the remaining 12,000 on the PC. Upon release Shadowrun debuted as the sixth highest selling game out of 40 titles for the week ending June 2, 2007, in the United Kingdom. The game fell off the UK charts the week ending 30 June 2007.

== See also ==
- 1-800-Magic, a machinima series by Rooster Teeth Productions created using the Shadowrun engine
