= Lace & Steel =

Tabletop role-playing game

Lace & Steel is a fantasy tabletop role-playing game published by TAGG (The Australian Games Group) in 1989. The game concentrates on swashbuckling action and has rules for both swordplay and romance.

== Description ==
The game is set in a fantasy world that resembles 17th-century Europe, though civilized centaurs ("half-horses") living with humans. A card-based system determines the results of all conflicts, fencing and sorcery. Characters are generated using a tarot deck. Courtly skills are given equal weight with combat abilities. The game also includes rules for character honor, and mass and hand-to-hand combat, plus a scenario.

== Publication history ==
Lace & Steel, with art by Donna Barr, and published as a boxed set containing a 56-page book, two 48-page books, and a 24-page book, two card decks, and an outer box sleeve.

== Reception ==
Lawrence Schick says that "[t]he rules take a highly original approach that will not be to all tastes [...] Definitely a system for players who are more interested in character interaction than in forming a group to go bash monsters."

== Tie-Ins ==
Pauli Kidd's novel Mus of Kerbridge is set in the same world as the RPG.

== Reviews ==
- GamesMaster International Issue 1 - Aug 1990
- Far & Away (Issue 1 - Apr 1990)
- RPG Review (Issue 35 & 36 - Jun/Sep 2017)
