= Shadowrun (1993 video game) =

1993 video game

- North American cover art
- Developer: Beam Software
- Publisher: Data East: PAL: Laser Beam Entertainment
- Producers: Koichi Ota; Adam Lancman
- Designers: Pauli Kidd; Greg Barnett; Arthur Kakouris
- Programmers: Darren Bremner; Andrew Bailey
- Artists: Holger Leibnitz; Mark Maynard
- Composer: Marshall Parker
- Series: Shadowrun
- Platform: Super NES
- Release: NA: May 1993; PAL: August 1993; JP: March 25, 1994
- Genre: Action role-playing
- Mode: Single-player

Shadowrun is a cyberpunk-fantasy action role-playing video game for the Super Nintendo Entertainment System, adapted from the tabletop role-playing game Shadowrun by FASA. The video game was developed by Australian company Beam Software and first released in 1993 by Data East.

The game is loosely based on the novel Never Deal with a Dragon by Shadowrun co-creator Robert N. Charrette and set in the year 2050. The player takes on the role of Jake Armitage, a man suffering from amnesia after having been critically wounded by assassins. The plot then follows Jake as he attempts to uncover his own identity and the identity of the mysterious figure who wants him dead, and eventually complete his mission. Harebrained Schemes' 2013 Shadowrun Returns links the stories of this game and of Shadowrun for the Sega Genesis.

A project to adapt Shadowrun for the Super NES had a turbulent history between 1989 and 1993, including having been halted in mid-development before being resumed in late 1992 under a tight deadline. Its eventual lead designer was Pauli Kidd, creator of Beam Software's 1992 Nightshade, elements and a feel of which she then carried on to Shadowrun. The game was a critical success, winning a number of industry awards, but was a commercial failure nevertheless. It was retrospectively acclaimed by several publications as an "ahead of its time" milestone in the history of the role-playing genre for the consoles and credited for having pioneered film noir style in video games.

== Gameplay ==
Gameplay screenshot

Shadowrun is an action role-playing game (RPG) that combines the statistical factor of the original tabletop game (with minor changes) with real-time gameplay. The player is given direct control over the protagonist Jake and moves him around using the directional pad within the game's isometrically displayed world. A cursor system allows the player to scroll a pointer across the screen and perform various actions that include opening doors and passageways, examining and picking up objects, engaging in conversation with non-player characters (NPCs), and utilizing firearms and magic commands while in combat.

In interacting with other characters, Shadowrun allows the player to gain information using a bank of terms. Whenever Jake hears a new and unusual term, this word is highlighted and is then added to the bank that he can use; from that point on, when speaking with NPCs, Jake is able to ask them about this new word; only in this manner can a player progress with the game. As the title of the game implies, Jake is described as a "shadowrunner", a mercenary type of character common within the Shadowrun world. The player is given the option to hire other shadowrunners as henchmen with "nuyen", the game's currency that can also be used to purchase guns and certain key items scattered throughout various locations.

Combat within Shadowrun often requires sharp reflexes, as practically every screen contains hidden assassins who, from random locations, open fire on Jake; the player may retreat or must otherwise immediately find the source of the attack and respond. Enemies typically drop nuyen, while at the same time, Jake builds up "karma". If the player retires to a bed to restore health and save one's progress, karma can be allocated into different attributes, skills, and magical powers.

At certain points in the game, Shadowrun allows the player to enter cyberspace. Using an item called a "cyberdeck", Jake is able to hack into computers to retrieve information, as well as gain more nuyen. During such scenes, the gameplay switches to a top-down perspective while an icon of Jake moves through cyberspace, fights intrusion programs, and retrieves data. If Jake dies in cyberspace, he dies in the outside world as well.

While the setting and a lot of gameplay elements are taken from the original pen and paper variant, certain gameplay elements have been modified. One example is that the "Condition Monitor" has been replaced with a more traditional hit points system, and the removal of the "Essence" mechanic, which decreases when cyberware is installed. This would reduce a character's ability to use magic as the installation of cyberware is making one less alive, thus less in tune with magic.

== Plot ==
Shadowrun is an adaptation of the FASA tabletop role-playing game of the same name. The storyline of the video game is loosely based on the first Shadowrun novel, Never Deal with a Dragon, written by Robert N. Charrette. The narrative opens in Seattle, Washington in the year 2050, where the protagonist Jake Armitage is shown being gunned down in the street. A shapeshifting vulpine figure rushes to his side and is seen casting a spell over Jake before leaving hastily as the medics arrive on the scene. Jake awakens in a morgue with complete memory loss. Soon, he is approached by the "Dog", a shamanistic totem who gives him a warning before vanishing.

The rest of the story is spent investigating the events leading to Jake's shooting, learning the identity of the shapeshifter who saved him, as well the person who ordered his assassination, a mysterious crime lord named "Drake". Most of the information is found by piecing together snippets of data found by hacking various protected computer systems. Along the way, he has encounters with gangs, criminals, and magically awakened creatures while under constant threat of attack from contract killers. Jake also discovers and develops his own latent magical abilities. Apart from his totem spirit, his only allies are the hired services of shadowrunners. It is eventually revealed that Jake is a data courier who was carrying a program in a computer built inside his brain. The program was designed to destroy a malevolent artificial intelligence, which the Aneki Corporation is trying to protect. The company is being aided by Drake, who turns out to be a dragon and the mastermind behind the plot.

== Development ==
The work to develop an adaptation of Shadowrun for the Super NES by the Australian developer Beam Software began when Adam Lanceman, part of the company's management team, acquired the license for FASA's 1989 tabletop RPG. The project was initially headed by Gregg Barnett until he abruptly left Beam midway through the game's development to start Perfect Entertainment in the United Kingdom. The game's production was halted by Beam, but eventually resumed before its set deadline.

Having been hired by Beam's parent company Melbourne House, fantasy and sci-fi writer Pauli Kidd quickly took Barnett's place as lead designer. According to Kidd, the given timeframe for finishing Shadowrun for publisher Data East was very short, forcing the team to complete production in a tumultuous five and a half to six months. An avid role-player, Kidd was already familiar with the Shadowrun license, but had to utilize the storyline that her predecessor had already gotten approved. Aspects of Beam's earlier action-adventure game Nightshade, of which Kidd was the writer, director and lead designer, were used as a basis for Shadowrun; specific film noir components such as "dark cityscapes, dialogue-heavy exchanges, and touches of humor" were adapted directly from the former to the latter. To coincide with the last of these qualities, Kidd and programmer Jeff Kamenek altered the original "serious" tone of Shadowrun by replacing portions of the script and artwork with more comedic elements. According to Kidd, "we made improvements and changes, but the basic concepts were pretty much the same [as in Nightshade]."

The ROM image of the first version of Shadowrun contains a much more crude script, with more sexual suggestive and violent phrases. For example, one line is changed from "morgue guys" to "chop shop guys". The game's distributor favored the less serious version for retail release, sparking indignation and conflict among Kidd and other members of Beam's staff. Kidd recalled: "Beam Software was a madhouse, a cesspit of bad karma and evil vibes. The war was reaching shooting level; old school creators who just wanted to make good games were being crushed down by a wave of managerial bull. It was no longer a 'creative partnership' in any way; it was 'us' and 'them'. People were feeling creatively and emotionally divorced from their projects." Shadowrun was ultimately completed by its deadline. Kidd credits this to the staffers abstaining from company meetings and workshops, and continually keeping management away from the designers.

Shadowrun was released in North America and Japan by Data East. In PAL regions, it was self-published by Beam Software as Laser Beam Entertainment. The 1994 Japanese version has a significantly longer introduction sequence than the English version of the game and also has a vertically uncompressed Shadowrun logo on the title screen. Other than that, it uses the same script as the North American and PAL editions, just with Japanese subtitles.

== Reception ==
Reception

Aggregate score
Aggregator	Score
GameRankings	70%

Review scores
Publication	Score
AllGame	3.5/5
Electronic Gaming Monthly	6/10, 7/10, 6/10, 7/10
Famitsu	7/10, 9/10, 8/10, 7/10
GameFan	89%, 84%, 80%, 80%
GamePro	18.5/20
Nintendo Life	9/10
Nintendo Power	3.7/5
Official Nintendo Magazine	90%
RPGamer	2/5
Super Play	85%
VideoGames & Computer Entertainment	9/10
Electronic Games	94%

The game was met with a positive critical reception and good reviews. Shadowrun was given a number of awards from various publications, including the title of the Best RPG of the Year by VideoGames, Electronic Games, and Game Informer, and was a runner-up for it in GamePro (behind Secret of Mana). The game was given the second place Nintendo Power Award in the category "Most Innovative (Super NES)" (it was also nominated in the category "For Challenge"), Nintendo Power describing it as "one of the best sci-fi games ever". However, the game sold poorly, partly because of low shipping numbers.

Shadowrun has been positively recounted in many retrospective lists and articles. It was listed it as the 34th best Super NES game by Super Play in 1996, as well as the 48th best game on any Nintendo platform by Nintendo Power in 1997. Ranking it as the 77th top Super NES game in 2011, IGN commented that while Shadowrun "didn't quite get away from all the common RPG stereotypes" it was still "a milestone for the introduction of film noir style into the gaming industry, though, so we can forgive the game for only being 90% groundbreaking." The game was also cited as an important milestone in the use of film noir style in video games by Game Informer, according to which "Shadowrun's moody music and dark streets set the somber tone for this RPG's prying conversations and self-reflective narrative." Game Informer also ranked Shadowrun as 125th place on their list of best video games of all time in 2009. IGN Australia listed Shadowrun among their favourite Australian video games in 2010, writing it was "without question, one of the best underexposed classics of the SNES era" because it presented players with "a mature narrative, strong characters and a dystopian backdrop" blended with traditional RPG elements in an "irresistible" way. That same year, 1UP.com included Shadowrun on their list of 15 games "ahead of their time" for its use of a keyword dialogue system, common to PC games but foreign to console games of the time. In 1996, GamesMaster ranked Shadowrun 9th on their "The GamesMaster SNES Top 10."

In 2002, GameSpot included it on the list of video games that should be remade and compared this "groundbreaking RPG" that was "truly ahead of its time" to the more recent Planescape: Torment. A remake of the game was also requested by Sam Bandah of X360, who called it "rather excellent", a "little-known classic" and "a cyberpunk RPG classic begging to return", and stated: "Shadowrun would be a perfect game to remake as a Mass Effect-style RPG – perhaps with the conversation system of the sadly much-maligned Alpha Protocol." In 2012, GamesRadar ranked this "one incredibly unique, noir-style story" as the third top "cult-classic franchise" that should be rebooted similar to how X-COM was.

== Legacy ==
Two co-licensed role-playing video games of the same name were released around the same time by different developers and publishers: the 1994 North America-exclusive Sega Genesis title by BlueSky Software and Sega, and the 1995 Japan-exclusive Sega Mega-CD title by Group SNE and Compile. The storyline and gameplay of the Super NES Shadowrun are completely different from these two games. In 2007, FASA Studio and Microsoft Studios released a multiplayer first-person shooter adaptation of the franchise for the Xbox 360 and Microsoft Windows.

The 1998 PC RPG Alien Earth was declared a spiritual sequel to Shadowrun by Beam Software (which developed both games), with producer David Giles saying he hoped to "Keep the original's gameplay RPG/combat/adventure elements that people liked, but up the graphic side of it."

In 2012, Harebrained Schemes announced that it would be producing a new Shadowrun role-playing video game, Shadowrun Returns, to be funded through Kickstarter. As a result of the Kickstarter appeal reaching a 1.5 million dollar target, Shadowrun's original creator and FASA Corporation's founder Jordan Weisman announced that the game would now feature an additional storyline tying in the new game with both the Super NES and Sega Genesis versions. This extra content was initially made available only to backers, becoming generally available some time after release. The protagonist of the Super NES game, Jake Armitage, is featured in Shadowrun Returns as both part of the game's main plotline and as an NPC that the player can hire to accompany them on various missions.
