= Pauli Kidd =

Australian writer of fantasy fiction

- Born: Paul James Kidd
- Occupation: Novelist
- Writing career
- Genre: Fantasy fiction

Pauli Kidd (Pauli Jayne Kidd; formerly Paul James Kidd), also known as Patpahootie, is an Australian writer of fantasy fiction.

== Career ==
Before pursuing a career in writing Kidd had worked at Beam Software, an Australia-based game developer. She is credited as, among other things, the writer, director and lead designer of Nightshade, an action-adventure title for the NES. She is also credited as the lead designer for Shadowrun.

Kidd's first book, entitled Mus of Kerbridge, was released in 1995 and received a short-list nomination for the 1995 Aurealis Awards best fantasy novel. She has since released six more stand alone novels, written a two book series and has contributed to two of the Dungeons & Dragons novel series, Forgotten Realms: Nobles and Greyhawk. Her novel releases include White Plume Mountain (WOTC), Descent into the Depths of the Earth (WOTC), A Whisper of Wings (Vision), The Rats of Acomar (Vision), The Fangs of K'aath (United Press UK), Lilith (Vision), Petal Storm (Vision), Neue Europa (Vision), and the Petal Storm graphic novel series. Kidd also has written a non-fiction strategy guide based on the video game Discworld II: Missing Presumed...!?, and has written two short stories which were published in Dragon Magazine.

Kidd lives in Perth, Australia. She had a lengthy career as an author.

== Bibliography ==
Kidd has had a long career as an author.

=== Novels ===
- Mus of Kerbridge (1995) (based in the setting of her own Lace & Steel roleplaying game)
- The Council of Blades (1996) (Forgotten Realms: Nobles, Book Five)
- A Whisper of Wings (1999)
- White Plume Mountain (1999) (Greyhawk Classics #2)
- Descent into the Depths of the Earth (1999) (Greyhawk Classics #3)
- The Rats of Acomar (2000)
- Queen of the Demonweb Pits (2001) (Greyhawk Classics #6)
- Fey (2005)
- Dreamscape (2007)
- Lilith (2007)
- Petal Storm (2007)
- Neue Europa (2007)
- Tiamat (2011)
- Halls of Orpheus (2011)
- Mission (2011)
- Red Sails in the Fallout (Gamma World (2011)
- Those Who Are Left (2012)
- Infinite Seas (2019)
- Earth-Kin (2021)

==== Effectuators ====
- Effectuators Book 1: Horrors of the Night (2011)
- Effectuators Book 2: Green and Pleasant Land (2012)
- Effectuators Book 3: To Foreign Shores (2013)
- Effectuators Book 4: Sweet Albion! (2014)

==== Fangs of K'aath ====
- Fangs of K'aath (1999)
- Guardians of Light (2006)

==== Travellers ====
- Travellers Book 1: The Epsilon Queen (2010)
- Travellers Book 2: The Ryakan Legacy (2010)
- Travellers Book 3: The Kimtoa Bequest (2010)

==== Spirit Hunters ====
- Spirit Hunters Book 1: The Way of the Fox (2014)
- Spirit Hunters Book 2: The Open Road (2016)
- Spirit Hunters Book 3: Tails High (2016)
- Spirit Hunters Book 4: Shadow of the Oni (2017)

==== GeneStorm ====
- City in the Sky (2015)
- Fort Dandelion (2015)

==== Infinite Seas ====
- Infinite Seas - Part One (2019)
- Infinite Seas - Part Two (2019)

=== Short fiction ===
- "By The Job" (2000) in Dragon Magazine, May 2000 - Issue #271
- "Keoland Blues" (2000) in Dragon Magazine, December 2000 - Issue #278

=== Non-fiction ===
- Discworld II: Missing Presumed...!? - The Official Strategy Guide (1996)
