= Mimpi Dreams =

2015 video game

- Developer: Silicon Jelly
- Publisher: Silicon Jelly
- Producer: Ondřej Bach
- Designers: matěj moravec, jakub kučera
- Writer: martin vaňo
- Engine: Unity
- Platforms: iOS; Windows; Android; OS X Linux; Nintendo Switch
- Release: iOS: 22 November 2015 (Czech Republic); 17 March 2016 (Worldwide); Windows: 22 March 2016; OS X: 22 March 2016; Linux: 22 March 2016; Android: 28 March 2016; Nintendo Switch; 15 November 2018
- Genres: Adventure, puzzle, platform
- Mode: Single-player

Mimpi Dreams is a 2015 video game developed by Czech company Silicon Jelly. It is a mix of an adventure puzzle and a platform game. It is a sequel to Mimpi.

== Gameplay ==
Mimpi Dreams features gameplay similar to the original game. The player controls Mimpi with directional arrows and interacts with surroundings by tapping, swiping, and dragging on them. He has to solve puzzles he comes across. The player can use bulbs for hints if he gets stuck at a puzzle. These bulbs can be collected along the way. He can also collect bones and Easter eggs that unlock special content.

There are currently 6 levels, each with a storyline. Challenge mode lets you replay the levels but with only one life.

== Reception ==
Pocket Gamer UK gave Mimpi Dreams 8/10 score. It praised the game's cartoon style and its visuals. It also compared it favorably to its predecessor and noted that Mimpi Dreams offers sharper controls and is more relaxed. On the other hand, it noted that the game is very linear and doesn't offer much challenge.

Server Gadgets gave the game 7 points of 10. This review praised the game's visuals and music. Gameplay and noticeably puzzles were also praised. The review noted on the other hand some "on-screen elements that make it tough to play on 4-inch iPhones."

Server Games.cz included Mimpi Dreams in its list of top 2015 video games developed in the Czech Republic and Slovakia.
