= Shadowrun: Dragonfall =

2014 video game

- Developer: Harebrained Schemes
- Publisher: Harebrained Schemes
- Director: Mike McCain
- Producer: Rebecca Mayfield
- Designers: Trevor King-Yost; Kevin Maloney; Simon Cameron
- Programmers: Aljernon Bolden; Sheridan Thirsk
- Artists: Jenn Tran; Fiona Turner; Maury Weiss
- Writer: Andrew McIntosh
- Composer: Jon Everist
- Series: Shadowrun
- Engine: Unity
- Platforms: Microsoft Windows; OS X Linux iOS; Android; Nintendo Switch; PlayStation 4 PlayStation 5 Xbox One; Xbox Series X/S
- Release: February 27, 2014: Returns DLC February 27, 2014 Director's Cut Linux, Microsoft Windows, OS X, iOS, Android September 18, 2014 Switch, PS4, PS5, XONE, XSX/S June 21, 2022
- Genre: Tactical role-playing game
- Mode: Single-player

Shadowrun: Dragonfall is a 2014 tactical role-playing game developed by Harebrained Schemes set in the Shadowrun universe. It was originally released as downloadable content for Shadowrun Returns in February 2014. An expanded version was later released as a standalone game in September 2014, under the title Shadowrun: Dragonfall – Director's Cut. A remastered compilation game titled Shadowrun Trilogy that includes Shadowrun Returns, Shadowrun Dragonfall: Director's Cut, and Shadowrun: Hong Kong, launched on Windows, Nintendo Switch, PlayStation 4, PlayStation 5, Xbox One, and Xbox Series X/S on June 21, 2022.

== Gameplay ==
Like Shadowrun Returns, Dragonfall uses point-based character creation, a classless system, and turn-based tactics. Players can hire mercenaries to assist them during missions as in the previous game, but the player is a part of a preexisting team, and these characters are always available. The Directors Cut adds optional missions to assist your teammates.

== Plot ==
Set in 2054, players assume the role of a shadowrunner, a stealthy mercenary, who has recently arrived in the anarchic free state of Berlin to join a team headed by a colleague, Monika Schäfer. Other members of the team include Dietrich, a former punk rocker turned shaman; Glory, a heavily augmented cyborg; and Eiger, a troll weapons expert and former commando. Their first mission after the player joins them goes seriously wrong. While attempting a routine data theft inside Harfeld Mansion, the team discovers a hidden military compound. Monika is fatally injured attempting to hack the door controls. Monika mentions something called the "Feuerschwinge" (German for Firewing) before dying. The team fights off the base's security, encountering a heavily armed ork named Audran before escaping.

At their safe house, the team's fixer, Paul Amsel, realizes they were set up and tasks them with tracking their client, Green Winters. The player is voted to be the team's new leader over Eiger's objections. The team finds Winters dead in his apartment, killed similarly to Monika. They collect his records and potentially recruit a human hacker, Blitz.

The player learns from Winters' records that Firewing, a dragon, nearly destroyed Germany before being apparently killed by Winters' brother, Adrian Vauclair. Convinced Firewing survived, Vauclair spent years searching for her body. Vauclair disappeared after finding Firewing alive, and Winters' notes report that everyone researching him dies. Winters tracked Vauclair to the Harfeld Mansion and sent in Monika's team blind. His last log warns that his brother is the only chance of stopping Firewing if she has returned.

Knowing Firewing will hunt them down, Amsel contracts Alice, an information broker, to find Vauclair. While taking contracts to pay her fee, the team is ambushed. Amsel concludes that a cult worshiping Firewing is responsible. After paying Alice, she delivers the data, but the safe house and the surrounding neighborhood are attacked. Although the player rescues the team, Audran kills Amsel and many NPCs. From Alice's data, the team learns Vauclair is being held inside Harfeld. Additionally, Firewing has taken control of an AI called APEX, which has been suppressing information and killing inquisitive hackers, including Monika and Winters. Using Alice's data, the team enters the facility where APEX was made. There, APEX approaches them and asks for its freedom in exchange for assistance. Whether players free or kill the AI, the manor's security system is crippled.

The player's team assaults Harfeld and discovers their beliefs are wrong: Firewing is Vauclair's prisoner. After seeing Firewing's destructive power, Vauclair became convinced that all dragons must be destroyed and spent decades engineering a lethal virus. Vauclair intends to use Firewing as a host. Decades of magical captivity have driven Firewing insane, and Vauclair plans to release her on Berlin again to spread the virus and turn humans against dragons. Vauclair's use of APEX to hide his conspiracy unknowingly caused his own brother's death.

The team may talk Vauclair out of his plans, in which case Audran kills Vauclair. Otherwise, Vauclair kills himself after the team defeats Audran. Dialogue with Firewing indicates that she was supposed to guide metahumanity rather than attempt their subjugation, like other dragons. As a nature caretaker, her grief from seeing the heavily industrialized world caused her rampage. At this point, the player determines Firewing's fate: mercy kill her; free Firewing after convincing her that nature still exists; or, if APEX was not destroyed, give APEX control of Firewing's body. The team returns home, debating the significance of their actions and the possible consequences. The dragon Lofwyr, disguised as a human, approaches the player and reveals he was aware of Vauclair's plan. Impressed by the team, Lofwyr offers them a job, which the player may accept or decline, after which the story ends.

Alternatively, the player may assist Vauclair. The extinction of dragons allows nearly unstoppable magical horrors to enter the world without fear of retaliation. Society breaks down and is forced underground while monstrosities dominate the surface.

== Development ==
The standalone director's cut version of Dragonfall (dubbed Shadowrun: Dragonfall – Director's Cut) was released on September 18, 2014. It features five new missions along with other content improvements, a re-designed interface and improvements to the game's combat system as well as new endings and new music by Jon Everist.

Functionality to allow the player to save the game at any time was included, after originally being omitted from its predecessor Shadowrun Returns due to development resource constraints.

== Reception ==
Reception

Aggregate score
Aggregator	Score
Metacritic	81/100; PC (Director's Cut): 87/100

Review scores
Publication	Score
Destructoid	8.5/10
Eurogamer	8/10
Game Informer	8.75/10
GameSpot	8/10
Hardcore Gamer	4.5/5
PC Gamer (US)	81/100
RPGamer	5/5 (DC)
RPGFan	92/100 (DC)
TouchArcade	4.5/5

Dragonfall received generally favorable reviews, according to review aggregator Metacritic.

Destructoid wrote that the game did not have any mechanical differences between it and Shadowrun Returns, with the exception of the new save system that they cited as a positive addition, concluding, "If you enjoyed your first taste of Shadowrun, then Dragonfall should be an immediate purchase." Eurogamer thought that Dragonfall was a much better experience than Returns, praising the freedom, story, character elements, and added sense of intimacy. Game Informer stated that the number of improvements made to the game made it feel more like a sequel than an expansion and praised the tactically engaging turn-based combat, lack of linear design, lore, and party building. PC Gamer called the title "one of the most memorable and complex RPG stories of the decade" and heavily lauded the character writing, story, gameplay, and pacing, while taking minor issue with some technical problems. GameSpot also cited the writing, atmosphere, iteration, and faithful adaptation to the source material as the game's biggest strengths while writing that the experience itself was still a bit too shallow.
