= Shadowrun =

Tabletop science fantasy role-playing game

- 20th Anniversary edition cover
- Designers: Robert N. Charrette; Paul Hume; Tom Dowd; L. Ross Babcock III; Sam Lewis; Dave Wylie; Mike Mulvihill
- Publishers: FASA; Fantasy Productions; Catalyst Game Labs
- Publication: 1989; 37 years ago; 1992 (second edition); 1998 (third edition); 2005 (fourth edition); 2009 (20th anniversary); 2013 (fifth edition) 2016 (Shadowrun Anarchy); 2019 (Sixth World)
- Genres: Science fantasy
- Systems: Custom
- Set in the same world as Earthdawn, millennia later (2088 AD) (Note: The first and second edition books were set 61 years in the future from their release dates (giving the game an original start date of 2050). This was increased to 65 years for the fourth edition. The fifth edition is set in 2075, 62 years in the future. The sixth edition, released in 2019, returns to the convention of first and second edition by setting the game year to 2080.)

Shadowrun is a science fantasy tabletop role-playing game set in an alternate near future, in which cybernetics, magic, and fantasy creatures co-exist. It combines the social genres of cyberpunk, urban fantasy, and true crime with shadow technology occasional elements of magic, Corp conspiracy, horror, and detective fiction. From its inception in 1989 it has spawned a franchise that includes a series of novels, a collectible card game, two miniature-based tabletop wargames, and multiple video games.

The title is taken from the game's main premise – a near-future world damaged by a massive magical event, where industrial espionage and corporate warfare run rampant. A shadowrun – a successful data theft or physical break-in at a rival corporation or organization – is one of the main tools employed by both corporate rivals and underworld figures. Deckers (futuristic hackers) can tap into an immersive, three-dimensional cyberspace on such missions as they seek access, physical or remote, to the power structures of rival groups. They are opposed by rival deckers and lethal, potentially brain-destroying artificial intelligences called "Intrusion Countermeasures" (IC), while they are protected by street fighters and/or mercenaries, often with cyborg implants (called cyberware), magicians, and other exotic figures. Magic has also returned to the world after a series of plagues; dragons who can take human form have returned as well, and are commonly found in high positions of corporate power.

== Publication history ==
Shadowrun was developed and published by FASA from 1989 until early 2001, when the company closed and Shadowrun was transferred to WizKids, a company founded by former FASA employees. Two years before its closure, FASA sold its videogame branch, FASA Interactive, to Microsoft corporation, keeping rights to publishing novels and pen and paper RPGs. Since then, digital rights to Shadowrun IP have belonged to Microsoft. WizKids licensed the RPG rights to Fantasy Productions, who were already publishing a German version, until WizKids was acquired by Topps in 2003. Catalyst Game Labs, a publishing imprint of InMediaRes Productions, licensed the rights from Topps to publish new products. WizKids itself produced an unsuccessful collectible action figure game based on the property, called Shadowrun Duels.

A fifth edition of Shadowrun was announced in December 2012. A limited-edition softcover was sold at the Origins Game Fair in June 2013, and the PDF in July 2013. A hardcover was published in August 2013.

Shadowrun Anarchy was published in October 2016 It is a simplified version of the ruleset which allows focus more on the narration than on the rules.

The sixth edition, called Shadowrun, Sixth World, was announced on May 1, 2019 to coincide with the game's 30th anniversary, along with a new website at shadowrunsixthworld.com. The game was published on August 26, 2019. The mechanics for this new version are generally similar to those of fifth edition, with some rules reworked for what line developer Jason Hardy describes as streamlining. This new version also progressed the in-game year to 2080.

Since 2004, Shadowrun Missions (SRM) has offered fans "living campaigns" that allow for persistent character advancement. SRM is broken down into seasons which are made up of up to 24 individual missions that can be played at home, with special missions available to play exclusively at conventions. Each SRM season develops an overarching plot focused on a specific city from the Shadowrun setting. Missions settings have included the divided city of Denver, the corporate city-state of Manhattan, the Seattle Metroplex city-state, the formerly walled-off wastelands of Chicago, and Neo-Tokyo. For Shadowrun, Sixth World missions returned to Seattle, with twenty-four missions set in 2081, right after Seattle declared independence from the UCAS. The current Shadowrun Missions setting is 2083 New Orleans.

The Shadowrun role-playing game has spawned several properties, including Shadowrun: The Trading Card Game, eight video games, an action figure game (Shadowrun Duels), two magazines, an art book and more than 50 novels, starting with the Secrets of Power series which introduces some of the original characters of Shadowrun and provides an introduction to this fictional universe. In addition to the main rule book there have been over 100 published supplements including adventures and expansions to both the rules and the game settings. Catalyst Game Labs announced that 2013 would be "The Year of Shadowrun," and in addition to the release of Shadowrun fifth edition that it has collaborated with publishers on the following properties: Shadowrun: Crossfire, The Adventure Deck-building Game; Shadowrun: Sprawl Gangers, a tactical miniatures wargame; and Shadowrun: Hostile Takeover, a board game designed by Bryan C.P. Steele was planned for release in late 2014/early 2015. Catalyst had been in collaboration with Nordic Games and Cliffhanger Studios to create Shadowrun Chronicles: Boston Lockdown online RPG, however it was shuttered November 30, 2018, with the producers citing lack of funding and the end of the license terms for use of the IP.

== Fictional universe ==
Shadowrun takes place several decades in the future (2050 in the first edition, currently 2088). The end of the Mesoamerican Long Count calendar ushered in the "Sixth World", (Note: See 2012 phenomenon.) with once-mythological beings (e.g. dragons) appearing and forms of magic suddenly emerging. Large numbers of humans have "Goblinized" into orks and trolls, while many human children are born as elves, dwarves, and even more exotic creatures. In North America, indigenous peoples discovered that their traditional ceremonies allow them to command powerful spirits, and rituals associated with a new Ghost Dance movement let them take control of much of the western U.S. and Canada, where they formed a federation of Native American Nations. Seattle remains under U.S. control by treaty as a city-state enclave, and most game materials are set there and assume campaigns will use it as their setting.

In parallel with these magical developments, the setting's 21st century features technological and social developments associated with cyberpunk science fiction. Megacorporations control the lives of their employees and command their own armies; many of the largest have extraterritoriality, such as currently enjoyed by foreign heads of state. Technological advances make cyberware (mechanical replacement body parts) and bioware (augmented vat-grown body parts implanted in place of or in tandem with natural organs) common. The Computer Crash of 2029 led to the creation of the Matrix, a worldwide computer network that users interact with via direct neural interface. When conflicts arise, corporations, governments, organized crime syndicates, and even wealthy individuals subcontract their dirty work to specialists, who then perform "shadowruns" or missions undertaken by deniable assets without identities or those that wish to remain unknown. The most skilled of these specialists, called shadowrunners, have earned a reputation for getting the job done. They have developed a knack for staying alive, and prospering, in the world of Shadowrun.

The Shadowrun world is cross-genre, incorporating elements of both cyberpunk and urban fantasy. Unlike in a purely cyberpunk game, in the Shadowrun world, magic exists and has "worked" since 2011. Among other things, this split humankind into subtypes, also known as metatypes/metahumans. Some of these metatypes take the form of common fantasy races. Likewise, some animals have turned into familiar monsters of past fantasy and lore and both monsters and human magicians have regained magical powers. By the second half of the 21st century, in the time the game is set, these events are accepted as commonplace. Man, machine, and magic exist in a world where the amazing is among the most common and technology has entered into every facet of human (and metahuman) life.

=== Races ===
Characters in Shadowrun can be humans, orks, trolls, elves, dwarves, as well as certain diverging subspecies (known as metavariants) such as gnomes, giants, dryads, etc. In the early days, when magic returned to the world, humans began to either change into, or give birth to, elf and dwarf infants, a phenomenon called Unexplained Genetic Expression (UGE). Later, some juvenile and adult humans "goblinized" into other races (mostly orks, but also some trolls). The term "metahuman" is used either to refer to humanity as a whole, including all races, or to refer specifically to non-human races, depending on context. The return of Halley's Comet brought even further variation in the form of changelings, who have variation atypical to their metatype or even species, such as electroreception. Two of the metahuman races, elves and orks, have fictional languages.

Additionally, a virus known as the Human Meta-Human Vampiric Virus (HMHVV), with many variant strains, has been known to cause further change, far beyond that of traditional vampirism, frequently resulting in fierce abominations that are no longer human and sometimes no longer even sentient: bandersnatches, banshees, dzoo-noo-quas, goblins, ghouls, nosferatus, vampires, wendigos, wild fomorians, and others. Most of these species do not consider human/metahuman types as more than victims, and are generally treated as dangerous subjects by society. Such characters are only playable in certain editions.

Branching out from metahumanity, the game also presents shapeshifters, sapient animals that can change shape into a metahuman form such as werewolves and selkies, characterized by intelligence and thought processes more in line of animals, and drakes, metahumans with a second form like that of a metahuman-sized dragon. Metasapient is used to refer to non-metahuman intelligent creatures. While many are discussed in various books, only naga, intelligent, thirty-foot long snakes; sasquatches; centaurs; pixies, artificial intelligences and free spirits are ever playable.

Dragons are also present in the awakened world, though they are not playable characters. Dragons are very powerful physically, magically and sometimes financially; some dragons found the riches they hoarded and hid during the last Awakening. Their intelligence allowed them to gain influence and power quickly and a few have risen to high political and economic posts, running entire corporations or even serving as heads of state.

=== Game background ===
The game is set 62 years in the future, following a great change that has returned magic to the world. The emergence of magic, the outbreak of the VITAS plagues, the Computer Crash of 2029, the Euro-Wars, and the fevers for independence of Amerindian tribes, Chinese provinces, and everything else that came with the many struggles that ravaged Europe and Asia left the world's governments tumbling and falling. The United States was broken into substates. Monetary value was lost. The world had to rebuild, and rebuild they did, this time in the image of the megacorporations that seized power. Taking advantage of the laws that had been passed years ago, and using their newfound freedom, the megacorps began impressing their power on the failing governments. Before long the world was transformed. Boundaries were redrawn, and the political landscape was changed forever.

A basic premise of the setting is that as the world endured the string of state-changing events and conflicts, the political landscape fragmented and reformed. In North America, for example, some nations broke apart and reformed, as was the case with the Confederation of American States and the United Canadian and American States, while others became havens for specific racial or ethnic groups, like Native American Nations (the Native Americans having used their newfound magical abilities to regain massive tracts of land) or the Elvish principality of Tír Tairngire, which encompasses all of the state of Oregon. Some, like the California Free State, simply declared independence, while yet others became de facto corporate subsidiaries like Aztlan (the former Mexico), the headquarters of the Aztechnology megacorp. Despite the new role of megacorporations, many nations still hold considerable sway through economic, social and military means. For most people, "getting by" means taking advantage of whatever the corps or the government might bring their way.

=== The corporations ===
The monolithic "enemies" of the Shadowrun world (borrowing heavily from cyberpunk mythos) are the corporations, dubbed "megacorporations", "megacorps", or simply "megas" or "corps" for short. Megacorporations in the 21st-century are global, with all but the smallest corps owning multiple subsidiaries and divisions around the world. They are the superpowers of the Shadowrun universe, with the largest corporations having far more political, economic, and military power than even the most powerful nation-states.

In Shadowrun, corporations are effectively "ranked" by the amount of assets under their control, including material, personnel, and property, as well as profit. These ranks are A, AA, and AAA; AAA corporations are top tier. Most corporations in the AA and AAA level are immune to domestic law, responsible only to themselves, and regulated only by the Corporate Court, an assembly of the ten AAA-rated corporations. All AAA-rated and most AA-rated corporations exhibit a privilege known as "extraterritoriality", meaning that any land owned by the corp is sovereign territory only to the corp and immune to any laws of the country it is located in. Corporate territory is not foreign soil but corporate soil, just like its employees are corporate citizens, though dual citizenship in a corporation and a nation is common. The AAA corps, as well as numerous minor corporations, fight each other not only in the boardroom or during high-level business negotiations but also with physical destruction, clandestine operations, hostile extraction or elimination of vital personnel, and other means of sabotage. Because no corporation wants to be held liable for damages, it has to be done by hired deniable assets, or "shadowrunners", invisible to the system where every citizen is tagged with a System Identification Number (SIN).

=== Technology and the Matrix ===
Despite the Crash which caused much data corruption, technology in the game is advanced. Ability-enhancing Cyberware (artificial cybernetic implants) and Bioware (genetically engineered biological implants) emerged and has become commonplace. Characters can also augment their bodies with nanotechnology implants.

In earlier editions of the background fiction, direct neural interface technology enabled humans and metahumans to directly access computers and the Matrix, the global computer network restructured after the 2029 Crash. Access to the Matrix was accomplished by "deckers": individuals that have "cyberdecks", portable or worn computing devices that interface with the user's brain through a brain–computer interface implant called a "datajack", which is typically located at the temple or behind the ear.

In the fourth edition, the Matrix rules have changed, thanks to the setting's constant evolution and a drive to match real world technological developments. After the second Matrix crash in 2064, Matrix technology was moved away from the wired network and into wireless technology. The most noticeable difference between the Matrix in the 2070s and the earlier editions is that wireless technology has become completely ubiquitous. Communications and Matrix access are provided through Wi-Fi nodes placed throughout the infrastructure of just about every city on Earth, fulfilling a service similar to contemporary cell sites, but as these nodes are as numerous as telephone poles, only a tiny percentage of their range is necessary. The nodes of all electronic devices a person carries are connected in a similar manner, creating a personal area network (PAN). People access their PAN with their Commlink, a combination personal computer/cell phone/PDA/wireless device available either as a brain implant or a head-mounted display. This access can be the total sensory immersion common to cyberpunk fiction, or a sensory enhancement by which the virtual features of one's physical surroundings can be perceived and manipulated. Other worn or carried personal devices are linked to the PAN, and this includes smart firearms. The Matrix of the 2070s is thus not only a virtual reality, but an augmented or mixed reality. Cyberdecks are obsolete, so "deckers" have once again become "hackers". In turn, the otaku of previous versions (deckers who did not need decks to access the Matrix) have been reworked into technomancers, who possess an innate connection to the Matrix that permits them to access the wireless network without hardware, though the phenomenon is not fully understood even within the setting, and may be partly magical in nature.

In the fifth edition, corporations have cracked down on hacking, reforming the matrix into Grids for better control and creating the Grid Overwatch Division (GOD). Hackers were thus forced to acquire specialized, larger variants of commlinks with better processing power, which were swiftly colloquially named "cyberdecks" after the devices of old. This has resulted in the return of the term "decker" of earlier editions.

Meanwhile, "riggers" are people who use datajacks and in most cases a special type of cyberware – called the "control rig" – to interface with vehicles and drones. Often they also use a remote control deck called the "rigger command console". The term "rigger" may also be applied to others using these machines.

Riggers jump in to machines to control them with their mind. While jumped in, they feel like they are the machine, using the vehicle or drone's sensors to replace their own. This allows the rigger to control their machines at Matrix speeds and with greater precision. The downside is if the machine takes damage, the rigger will have to deal with dangerous levels of biofeedback. Likewise, the rigger may have to engage in cybercombat with hostile parties that may attempt to hijack control of their devices.

=== Magic ===
Those able to actively interact with the magical energies of the Sixth World are known as "awakened". An awakened character's power in magic is linked to their Magic attribute. A magic user's approach to working with mystic energy is called their Path. The Awakened fall into three general Paths: magicians, adepts and mystic adepts. Broadly speaking, magicians focus their magic outward, actively affecting the world around them, while adepts focus their magic inward, passively enhancing their bodies and minds.

Magicians are able to cast spells, summon spirits, and create magical artifacts called "foci". All magicians follow traditions that determine their understanding of magic, including hermetic mages (whose control of magic comes through study and manipulation of magical energy or mana, and who summon and bind elementals in lengthy and expensive rituals to be called on later) and shamans (whose magic derives from a connection to nature via a totem spirit, and who can summon the nature spirits associated with a particular place). Adepts use magic internally in order to enhance their natural physical abilities. Adepts can run on walls, use mundane objects as deadly thrown projectiles, shatter hard objects with a single unarmed blow, and perform similar feats of incredible ability. All adepts follow a very personal path (Path of the Warrior, Path of the Artist, etc.) that normally determines their abilities, which might be very different for any two adepts (while one might demonstrate increased reflexes and facility with firearms, a second might possess unparalleled mastery of the katana, and a third might be able to pull off incredible vehicular stunts). Mystic adepts, also known as physical mages, are part magician and part adept who distribute their magic power between the abilities of both aspects.

== System ==
=== Mechanics ===
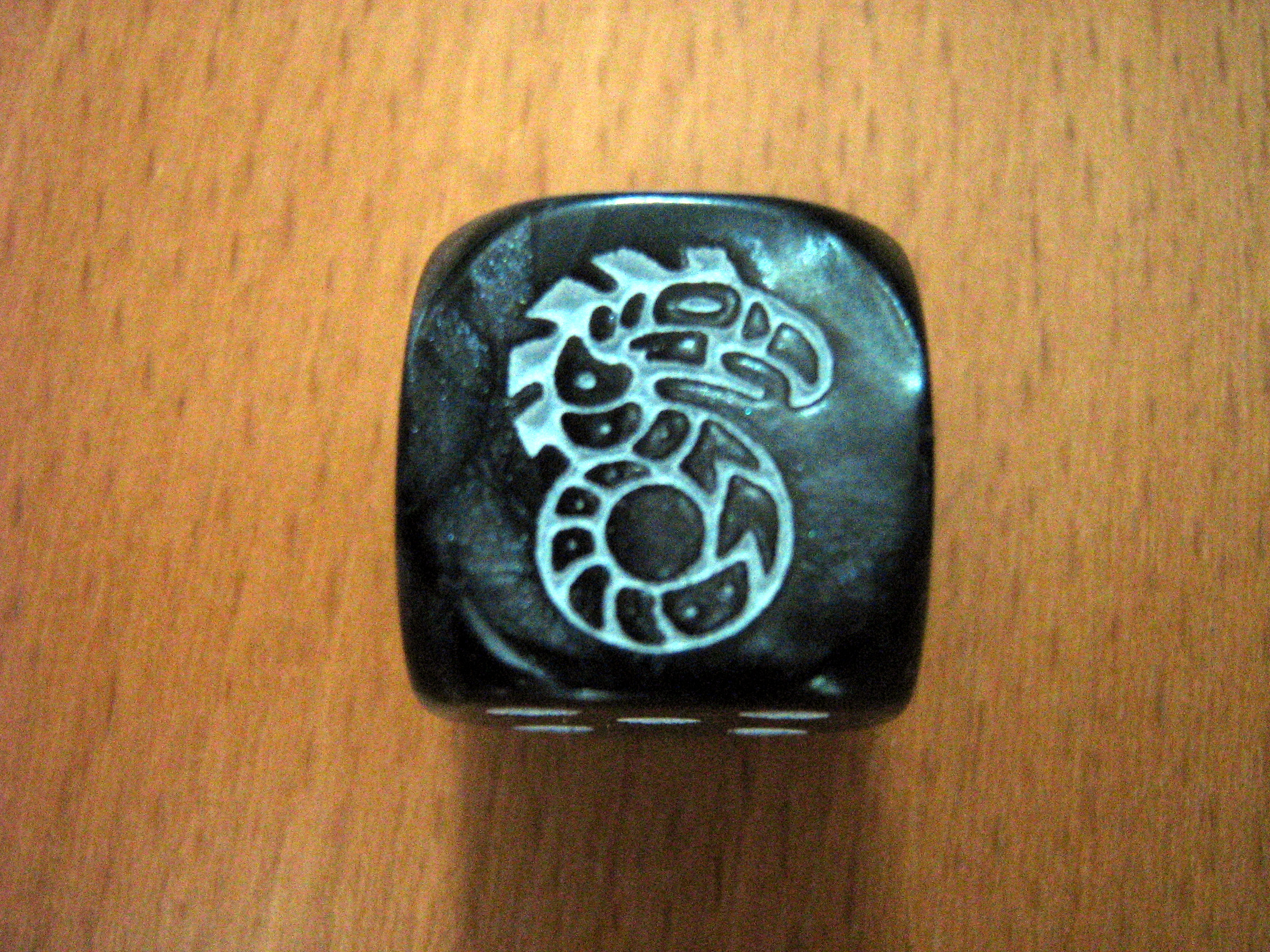
A 6-sided die with the Shadowrun symbol in place of the 6

The Shadowrun game mechanics are based entirely on a 6-sided dice system. The game is skill-based rather than class-based, but archetypes are presented in the main book to give players and gamemasters an idea of what is possible with the system.

Before the fourth edition, skill and ability checks worked as follows: all actions in the game, from the use of skills to making attacks in combat, are first given a target number that reflects the difficulty of the action which is then raised or lowered by various modifying factors, such as environmental conditions, the condition of the character, the use of mechanical aids, and so forth. The player then rolls a number of dice equal to their level in the relevant skill, and the number of dice rolled that meet or exceed the target number determines if the character is successful in performing the action and the degree of success the character has. As an example, a character with a high firearms skill not only has a better chance of hitting a target than someone with a lower ranked skill, but is also more likely to cause more damage to the target. Target numbers may exceed 6, in which case any dice that show a 6 have to be re-rolled (a target number of, e.g., 9 is reached by rolling a 6 followed by at least a 3; a target number of 6 and one of 7 are identical, except extra dice rolls are not allowed for target number 7 or greater). For even higher target numbers, this procedure has to be repeated; thus, an action with a target number of 20 (like attempting to procure military-grade weaponry) will only succeed if three successive dice rolls result in sixes, and the fourth gives at least a 2. For any dice roll, a roll of 1 always counts as a failure.

In addition to this basic mechanic, players can use several task-specific dice pools to add bonus dice to certain tests, though dice that are used do not refresh until the end of a turn. This adds an extra tactical element, as the player must decide where best to spend these bonus dice. For example, combat pool dice could be spent to improve attacks or to improve defense, or some of each. Players also have Karma Pool that can be used to reroll any dice that failed to reach the target number. Karma Pool refreshes rarely, typically once per scene or less, at the GM's discretion. The combination of Karma Pool and dice pools gives players a considerable amount of freedom to decide how important a task is to their character. Two characters with identical statistics could perform very differently on the same tasks depending on their priorities (and thus, allocation of dice pools and Karma Pool).

In the fourth edition, mechanics changed substantially. The game still runs on six-sided dice, but now each task is given a threshold. The player then rolls dice equal to their skill plus the relevant attribute modified by applicable modifiers. The number of fives and sixes is equal to the number of hits. Hits above the threshold indicate extraordinary performance. Furthermore, if more than half the dice rolled are ones, then the player has made a "glitch." Glitches cause bad things to happen to the player and game masters are encouraged to be inventive and funny.

=== Archetypes ===
Although the skill system is freeform, certain combinations of skills and equipment work well together. This combination of specialization in skill and equipment is known as an archetype. The most notable archetypes are street samurai, characters who have heavily augmented their bodies with cyberware and bioware and focus on physical combat; adepts, characters who have magical abilities that increase their physical (and sometimes mental) combat abilities; faces, highly charismatic characters who specialize in negotiations and social manipulation; deckers (hackers), experts in electronic surveillance, security, and augmented/virtual reality monitoring, combat and response; riggers, who augment their brains to achieve fine control over vehicles and drones; and magicians, who cast spells and can view emotions and call spirits from astral space. In Fourth Edition, with the setting change, deckers are replaced by hackers, who manipulate computer networks with augmented reality via ubiquitous commlinks; they also tend to take over the rigger's role.

However, the archetypes are not character classes: the player is allowed to cross boundaries. Restrictions are not imposed by the system itself, but by the player's specializations. Because character-building resources are limited, the player has to weigh which game resource they want to specialize in and which they have to neglect.

=== Character creation ===
The fourth edition of Shadowrun uses a point-based character creation system. Earlier editions, and later in the fifth edition, use a priority-based system with point-based character creation as an advanced option. Priorities are divided into race, magic, attributes, skills, and resources. All things that do not explicitly fall under the first four classifications, including contacts in third and earlier editions of Shadowrun, are given cash-equivalent values to be bought with resources.

Shadowrun characters are created with contacts, friends and acquaintances who serve as key nodes in the character's social network and who will often help the character out. Through the contacts system, players may uncover information that their characters cannot independently acquire. Additionally, players can often negotiate for the use of skills that their characters do not themselves have, a departure from most role-playing games.

=== Essence and Karma/Edge ===
Essence is a measure of a living being's lifeforce. All humans and metahumans start with a value of six (although critters may start with a higher or lower Essence). It powers magic, and as essence fades, so does magical aptitude. Cyberware, bioware, nanotech implants, extreme cases of substance addiction, and other major changes to a being's body can damage its essence as well. Generally, if a being's essence ever reaches zero, it dies. Cybermancy allows metahumans to survive with an essence rating of zero or less.

Players are awarded Karma points as a game progresses. In the third edition and earlier, these points are usually added to a total called Good Karma, which can be used to boost attributes and skills. Skills that are already well-developed cost more Good Karma than skills which are undeveloped, which helps encourage specialized characters to become more flexible by spending Good Karma on weaker attributes. Karma also makes characters more powerful in general because every tenth (or twentieth for metahumans) point is added to the Karma Pool instead of Good Karma. The Karma Pool allows players to re-roll dice or "purchase" additional dice in certain situations. Karma can even be used to avoid certain death, at the cost of all Good Karma and Karma Pool points. In the fourth edition, Karma Pool is replaced by a new attribute called Edge which can be used in most of the same ways as the third edition Karma Pool. Experience and character advancement is still tracked with Karma, although Good was dropped from the name as it no longer needs to be distinguished from the old Karma Pool.

== Influences and links ==
Shadowrun is linked to Earthdawn, and is set in the "Sixth World", where Earthdawn is the "Fourth World" and modern-day Earth is at the tail end of the Fifth World. Such links are not necessary for play, but they allow crossover potential. The concept of the "Worlds" is linked to the ancient Aztec belief that the world is renewed every five thousand years—a period called a "Sun" (currently we live in the fifth Sun). The date of the beginning of the "Sixth World" is based on the ancient Mesoamerican Long Count calendar, which when Shadowrun was developed was correlated as finishing a 5,200-year-long cycle on December 24, 2011. The understanding of the Maya that resulted in the use of the 2011 date and the use of the "worlds" concept is due to the influence of Frank Waters's 1975 book Mexico Mystique: The Coming Sixth World of Consciousness, whose elaborate cosmology is selectively utilized in the framework of the Shadowrun universe. Waters took his information about the date of the end of the Mesoamerican Long Count calendar from the 1966 edition of Michael D. Coe's The Maya.

Shadowrun is also influenced by the writings of William Gibson (particularly Neuromancer). Gibson, who gave no permission and expressed strong aversion for mixing his ideas with "spare me, *elves*," reacted as follows to its release:

[W]hen I see things like Shadowrun, the only negative thing I feel about it is that initial extreme revulsion at seeing my literary DNA mixed with elves. Somewhere somebody's sitting and saying 'I've got it! We're gonna do William Gibson and Tolkien!' Over my dead body! But I don't have to bear any aesthetic responsibility for it. I've never earned a nickel, but I wouldn't sue them. It's a fair cop. I'm sure there are people who could sue me, if they were so inclined, for messing with their stuff. So it's just kind of amusing.

In 2007, Robert Boyd from Carrickfergus, Northern Ireland, robbed a Belfast lingerie shop at knifepoint while wearing a blonde Harpo Marx wig. During his trial, Boyd stated he was playing Shadowrun, specifically the role of criminal elf Buho, at the time and may have "blurred reality and fantasy". This claim convinced only two members of the jury and Boyd was jailed for two years.

== Novels ==
FASA released 40 Shadowrun novels in collaboration with Roc publishing between 1991 and 2001. Shadowrun novels went out of production between 2001 and 2005, making the books produced towards the end of FASA's ownership of the license hard to find. Another (41st) novel was announced, but never released.

In 2005, WizKids began publishing new Shadowrun novels, again through the Roc imprint of the New American Library. Six novels were released in the new series. In 2008, Catalyst Game Labs announced the return of novels for Classic BattleTech, MechWarrior and Shadowrun. The announcement states that the first of the all-new Shadowrun novels would appear tentatively by early 2009, but the novels were not released due to unexplained delays in production of the novels for all three franchises. A collection of short stories titled Spells and Chrome was published in 2010. In 2012, Catalyst Game Labs published a standalone electronic novella, Neat, written by Russell Zimmerman. Catalyst later announced plans to release further fiction and eventually novels to be released in collaboration with Barnes & Noble in Winter 2013.

Several additional novels were published in other languages. More than 30 novels have been written in German, by German and Austrian authors published by Heyne (since 1991) and FanPro (since 1997).

== Video games ==
Eight video games have been developed based on the Shadowrun franchise; the first in 1993 was an action role-playing game titled Shadowrun and developed by Beam Software for the Super Nintendo Entertainment System. The second, also titled Shadowrun, was released for the Sega Genesis in 1994, developed by BlueSky Software. The third game was a visual novel adventure game developed by Japanese company Group SNE in 1995 for the Sega CD, again titled Shadowrun. A fourth game, titled Shadowrun: Assassin, was planned to be released in 1998 by FASA Interactive Technologies for the PC, but was cancelled. The next game released was a first-person shooter for the Xbox 360 and Windows Vista, entitled Shadowrun. It was developed by FASA Interactive, owned by Microsoft, which also produced the title. It was the very first game that allows cross-platform play on the Games for Windows – Live service. As the publishers of the Shadowrun role-playing game stated at the time of the video game's release: "Microsoft rewrote the timeline and setting for this game, so it is not in continuity with the tabletop RPG. It may be more accurately described as a game loosely based on Shadowrun."

In September 2007, Microsoft closed FASA Studios and licensed the Shadowrun electronic entertainment rights to Smith & Tinker, a company owned by Jordan Weisman, one of the original creators of Shadowrun. In 2012, Weisman's company Harebrained Schemes launched a Kickstarter campaign to fund the development of Shadowrun Returns, a 3D turn-based single player role-playing video game. Approximately 1.8 million US dollars were pledged, four times more than the $400,000 goal. Shadowrun Returns was released on July 25, 2013. An expansion for Shadowrun Returns named Shadowrun: Dragonfall was created as a stretch goal, and then later re-released as a standalone game called Shadowrun: Dragonfall - Director's Cut. In January 2015, Harebrained Schemes launched another Kickstarter to fund Shadowrun: Hong Kong, which was released August 2015. Jan Wagner's Cliffhanger Productions also ran a successful Kickstarter campaign for an online 3D turn-based strategy role-playing video game that can be played either alone or with other players. On August 14, 2012, the campaign was funded at $558,863. The game was due to be released at the end of 2013 as Shadowrun Online, but was actually released in April 2015 as Shadowrun Chronicles: Boston Lockdown. In December 2017, Microsoft registered the Shadowrun's trademarks, recovering the rights from the series. Shadowrun Trilogy, including remastered versions of Shadowrun Returns, Shadowrun: Dragonfall - Director’s Cut and Shadowrun: Hong Kong - Extended Edition, was released in June 2022 for consoles.

Chronology of Shadowrun video games:

- 1993 – Shadowrun (Beam Software; SNES)
- 1994 – Shadowrun (BlueSky Software; Genesis/Mega Drive)
- 1996 – Shadowrun (Group SNE; Sega/Mega CD)
- 2007 – Shadowrun (FASA Interactive; Windows and Xbox 360)
- 2013 – Shadowrun Returns (Harebrained Schemes; Windows, Linux, Mac, iOS and Android tablets, Nintendo Switch, Xbox One, Xbox Series X|S, PlayStation 4, and PlayStation 5)
- 2014 – Shadowrun: Dragonfall (Harebrained Schemes; Windows, Linux, Mac, iOS and Android tablets, Nintendo Switch, Xbox One, Xbox Series X|S, PlayStation 4, and PlayStation 5)
- 2015 – Shadowrun Chronicles: Boston Lockdown (Cliffhanger Productions; Windows, Linux, Mac, Ouya, iOS and Android tablets, all desktop browsers via the Unity Web Player)
- 2015 – Shadowrun: Hong Kong (Harebrained Schemes; Windows, Linux, Mac, Nintendo Switch, Xbox One, Xbox Series X|S, PlayStation 4, and PlayStation 5)

== Reception ==
Stephan Wieck reviewed Shadowrun in White Wolf #17 (1989), rating it a 4 out of 5 and stated that "I would recommend Shadowrun to experienced or older gamers. To these players, I give it a very high recommendation."

In the September–October 1989 edition of Games International (Issue #9), Lee Brimmicombe-Wood was impressed by the production values, calling it "beautifully laid out and with some of the best illustrations I've seen outside of French rolegames." He admired the skill resolution system, calling it "beautifully elegant," although he found the magic system "instantly forgettable." Despite all its good points, he found the game's reliance on standard Dungeons & Dragons tropes "does not sit all that comfortably in a cyberpunk universe. [...] The dumping of elves, dwarfs and orcs into this technopunk environment fails to work." He concluded by giving Shadowrun an average rating of 3 out of 5.

In the October–November 1989 issue of Space Gamer, Lester W. Smith commented, "Shadowrun is a very visual game system. That is, it encourages imagery and role-playing, without bogging down in overly dry rules."

In Issue 72 of the French games magazine Casus Belli, Mathias Twardowski reviewed the second edition of the game and commented, "Rather than continuing to mitigate the system's deficiencies in small steps, FASA has courageously rewritten its game. It's a dangerous gamble that few companies dare to attempt, but a successful gamble in every way ... The rules in general are better written, clearer, and now clearly describe this bizarre universe, making this mixture of magic and technology 'coherent'. The role of the Shadowrunners is finally detailed, which is not a luxury since it is neither more nor less what the players embody." Tawrdowski concluded, "Shadowrun 2nd Edition is so close to the old version and yet so much better that it feels like the same game but tested, the first edition being only a draft ... Regulars will move on to the second edition without any difficulty and even with great pleasure as it is thought out, more logical, in short more to the point. For those who don't know Shadowrun, this is an excellent opportunity to discover this game."

Matthew Gabbert reviewed Shadowrun: Second Edition as a sneak preview in White Wolf #33 (Sept./Oct. 1992), rating it a 5 out of 5 and stated that "If the artwork and production values for the final version of Shadowrun II are up to FASA's usual high standards, then I see no reason not to give this nicely maturing product my highest recommendation."

In Issue 8 of the Australian game magazine Australian Realms, Malcolm Adler reviewed the second edition, and commented, "All of you will be relieved to hear magic has been reworked (taking the basis of the new magic system from [1st edition supplement] The Grimoire) and all other facets, especially combat and character creation have been streamlined and explained with examples throughout." Adler also noted "The new edition puts an emphasis on role playing and character building. This adds to a feel throughout the book of the game leaving the 'Disney' look behind. The world just got deadlier and certainly a tad darker." Adler concluded, "FASA has done the impossible it seems and produced a second edition game that looks like it is going to be a hell of a long time before a third edition is ever needed. Strongly recommended to any Shadowrunners. Anyone else who is looking for a change in system, I suggest you give this a very good look over. Man meets magic and machine, well worth it."

Challenge #41 called this "a truly hot game ... It's a great game value, a nicely put together book, and a lot of fun."

The German magazine Envoyer reviewed the third edition of the game and noted, "The new set of rules continues the tradition of the existing works in terms of its structure, but has overall become more user-friendly ... These changes seem logical since they have been house-ruled by most groups in one way or another." However, Envoyer pointed out "the expansion system for vehicles remains unmentioned. The equipment list also only contains the bare essentials. What is particularly noticeable is that this is now 2060, but there is not a mention of the bioware that was introduced into the Shadowrun world in 2054." Despite these issues, the review concluded that the third edition "stands out from its predecessors thanks to its presentation and better readability."

In his 1990 book The Complete Guide to Role-Playing Games, game critic Rick Swan noted the inclusion of magic in the tech-heavy setting, calling it "an excuse to mix fantasy in a pot of hardcore science fiction and see what crawls out." Swan thought the magic system was "terrific fun", with "detailed, imaginative treatments." However, Swan found that "Unfortunately, fuzzy and overly complicated rules plague Shadowrun throughout." Despite this, Swan concluded by giving the game a solid rating of 3 out of 4, saying, "Still, the merits of the setting surpass the awkwardness of the rules ... any game where a fire-breathing dragon can turn up as a corporate chairman is worth checking out."

In a 1996 reader poll by the British games magazine Arcane to determine the 50 most popular roleplaying games of all time, Shadowrun was ranked 8th. Editor Paul Pettengale commented: "Shadowrun's strength lies in the cleverly designed background, which creates a unique setting that actually works and is continually evolving. It also ties in with FASA's other main system, Earthdawn - while Shadowrun is the future, Earthdawn is the past of the same world. Between the two a fascinating universe has been created, offering a great deal of potential for all styles of play."

In 2007, Shadowrun was chosen for inclusion in Hobby Games: The 100 Best. Steven S. Long commented: "Shadowrun second edition belongs on the list of best hobby games because it so superbly integrates the gaming-specific material with the setting information. In doing so it satisfies what many gamers see as their twin needs: hard-and-fast rules that make gameplay fun; and an immersive setting that enhances the gaming experience, rather than detracting from it."

Scott Taylor for Black Gate in 2013 rated Shadowrun as #7 in the top ten role-playing games of all time, saying "Through five editions of the game, it still finds a way to showcase what gamers have enjoyed about it even today. Because of this game many players can still tell you what a decker, a street samurai, and smartlinks are without batting an eye."

In his 2023 book Monsters, Aliens, and Holes in the Ground, RPG historian Stu Horvath noted, "For all the pitfalls, Shadowrun is a game with a heart. The fantasy elements counter the coldness of the game's science fiction, encouraging characters to have beliefs and ideals. Those convictions give stakes to everything in the game, which, in turn, make the world come alive."

=== Awards ===
The second edition won the 1992 Origins Award for "Best Roleplaying Rules" and for "Best Graphic Presentation of a Roleplaying Game, Adventure, or Supplement".

The Shadowrun role-playing game, various expansions, the short story anthology Spells & Chrome, and a Shadowrun collectible card game have won Origins Awards. The fourth edition also won the ENnie Awards for Best Rules as well as for Best Product in 2006. In 2010, Shadowrun – 20th Anniversary Edition won three silver ENnies: Best Interior Art, Best Production Values and Best Game.

== Other reviews and commentary ==
- SF Site
- Dosdediez (Número 1 - Nov/Dic 1993)
- Backstab #11
- Rebel Times #3 (review of 4th ed)
