= Shadowrun: Hong Kong =

2015 video game

- Developer: Harebrained Schemes
- Publisher: Harebrained Schemes
- Directors: Mitch Gitelman; Mike McCain
- Producer: Chris Klimecky
- Designer: Trevor King-Yost
- Programmer: Garret Jacobson
- Artists: Mike McCain; Chris Rogers
- Writer: Andrew McIntosh
- Composer: Jon Everist
- Series: Shadowrun
- Engine: Unity
- Platforms: Microsoft Windows; OS X Linux; Nintendo Switch; PlayStation 4 PlayStation 5 Xbox One; Xbox Series X/S
- Release: Linux, Microsoft Windows, OS X August 20, 2015; Switch, PS4, PS5, XONE, XSX/S; June 21, 2022
- Genre: Tactical role-playing
- Mode: Single-player

Shadowrun: Hong Kong is a turn-based tactical role-playing video game set in the Shadowrun universe. It was developed and published by Harebrained Schemes, who previously developed Shadowrun Returns and its standalone expansion, Shadowrun: Dragonfall - Director's Cut. It includes a new single-player campaign and also shipped with a level editor that lets players create their own Shadowrun campaigns and share them with other players.

In January 2015, Harebrained Schemes launched a Kickstarter campaign to fund additional features and content they wanted to add to the game that would not have been possible with the original budget. The initial funding goal of US$100,000 was met in only a few hours. The campaign ended the following month, receiving over $1.2 million.

The game was developed with an improved version of the engine used with Shadowrun Returns and Dragonfall. Harebrained Schemes decided to develop the game only for Microsoft Windows, OS X, and Linux, so that they did not have to factor in the hardware limitations of tablets, as they did with their previous Shadowrun games. The game was released worldwide in August 2015. An extended edition, featuring a new campaign, a developer commentary, and bug fixes for the original game, was released in February 2016. The update was released for free for everybody who owned the original game. Shadowrun Trilogy, a remastered compilation game that includes Shadowrun Returns, Shadowrun Dragonfall: Director's Cut, and Shadowrun: Hong Kong, launched on Windows, Nintendo Switch, PlayStation 4, PlayStation 5, Xbox One, and Xbox Series X/S on June 21, 2022.

== Gameplay ==
The game features isometric graphics, with 3D models for characters.

=== Combat ===
Combat is turn based, with the player controlling the actions of their team followed by the enemies taking their actions. All characters can act based on their action point (AP). Characters start with a base of 2 AP per turn but can temporarily gain or lose AP based on abilities, spells or items used on them. AP is used on such actions as moving, attacking an enemy, reloading a firearm, or using a spell or item. Any AP that is not used by the end of the player's turn is forfeited.

== Plot ==
The game is set in 2056, within the Hong Kong Free Enterprise Zone, a city which is effectively controlled directly by the corporations. Unlike the previous games, the player has a backstory tied to other characters. The player was once an orphan on the streets of Seattle, along with their foster brother Duncan, when they were adopted by a man known as Raymond Black. However, the player became estranged from Raymond and Duncan after getting arrested and sent to a corporate prison eight years before the events of the game. After being released, the player gets a message from Raymond requesting that they and Duncan meet him in Hong Kong.

The player travels to Hong Kong and meets up with Duncan, who had joined a private police organization known as the Lone Star, and his superior officer Carter. The three agree to investigate Raymond's mysterious message, and, noting that he has not come to the rendezvous, traverse through the docks looking for him before encountering a team of Shadowrunners. They learn that the runners were hired by Raymond to escort them, but Carter and two of the runners are killed in an ambush by the Hong Kong Police Force. The four survivors manage to escape to Heoi, a small boat village on the outskirts of the Walled City, which has since been rebuilt and expanded into an overcrowded, nightmarish slum. In Heoi, they go to meet the runners' fixer, the Yellow Lotus Triad crime boss Kindly Cheng, who grants Duncan and the player her protection in exchange for becoming her Shadowrunners. Deducing that the HKPF acted on behalf of a third party, Cheng agrees to investigate who has been trying to kill them and Raymond's whereabouts. The player also gets acquainted with the surviving Shadowrunners who make up their team - Gobbet (an Orc street-shaman), Is0bel (a Dwarf cyberdecker), Racter (a Russian rigger partnered with his self-built drone named Koschei) and Gaichu (a former Japanese assassin turned ghoul, who can be later rescued by the player and recruited).

As the game progresses, Cheng and the team finds out that Raymond was captured by Josephine Tsang, the CEO of Tsang Mechanical Services and member of Hong Kong's ruling Executive Council. It is then revealed that Raymond is actually Josephine's son, Edward Tsang, and that he had worked with her to construct the new Walled city in the 2010s. During this time the player suffers increasingly disturbing nightmares, implying that something terrible is coming.

After rescuing him from Tsang's headquarters, Raymond reveals that many years ago, he had learned to create devices that could manipulate qi; the force of magic and luck, noting that places predominant with positive qi would become prosperous with good fortune. During a refugee crisis in Hong Kong, Raymond and Josephine came up with an idea to recreate the Walled City around an enormous qi machine dubbed 'Prosperity', which malfunctioned. Despite Raymond's pleas, Josephine claimed that the device was too expensive to salvage, and the device was abandoned, and with the qi becoming even worse than it was, the Walled city devolved into a nightmarish slum. Edward eventually ran to Seattle, and lived his life under the name Raymond Black, before suffering nightmares related to the Walled City. Realizing that whatever entity that had broken the machine was now attempting to enter reality, Raymond had decided to return to shut it down himself.

After arriving in Heoi, it becomes clear that the astral entity is demonic Yama King Qian Ya: The Queen of a Thousand Teeth, and that she is the source of the nightmares as she breaks into reality to become ruler of the Walled City. The player's team confront Qian Ya in Prosperity, at which point the player may choose from three endings: Allowing Raymond to sacrifice himself to Qian Ya to destroy Prosperity, betraying Raymond to Qian Ya to allow her to take over the Walled City, or forcing Qian Ya to return to her realm under threat of releasing the other Yama Kings, who would destroy her.

Returning to Heoi, it is revealed that the madness that gripped the Walled City was provoked by an external module that Josephine ordered installed on the machine, that siphoned all of the positive qi while leaving the negative effects behind, pooling to the point that the distortion could allow Qian Ya to manifest in the real world. In the game's epilogue, the final confrontation in the Walled City is written off as the events of a drug lab accident causing mass hallucinations. With the machine destroyed, Josephine can no longer siphon the qi, and her company is eventually bought out. If the player had found evidence of her misdeeds in her headquarters, then she is arrested and sent to jail, where she later hangs herself. It is also mentioned that the player continues to operate out of Heoi as a shadowrunner without an APB on their head, now undisturbed by dreams.

=== Shadows of Hong Kong ===
The extended edition of the game is set some time after the events of the main story. Following a botched mission that results in the player and their team being captured by the HKPF, they meet Senior Investigators Lem and Qiu, the latter of which represents Mitsuhama Corporation, who is HKPF's primary source of equipment and funding. Qiu explains that she and Lem are leading a task force investigating the HKPF's Special Duties unit, which has been gaining infamy for their violent and often excessive methods against citizens of Hong Kong. Qiu also tells the player that Chief Inspector Krait, the woman in charge of the Special Duties Unit, is the one responsible for the all points bulletin that forced the player and Duncan to become shadowrunners in the first place, and requests their assistance due to the player's prior experience with Krait. With Kindly Cheng's authorization, the player and their team agree to work for the task force.

The player infiltrates the SDU's headquarters to gather evidence against Krait, but are ambushed by Lem, who betrays the player and Qiu to the SDU. Qiu, revealing herself to be a mage who was suppressing her powers to draw out the mole within the task force, overpowers and kills Lem and assists the player's team in fighting their ways out of the headquarters. Realizing that the entire task force is compromised, Qiu enlists the help of Captain Jomo to take her and the player's team to the Benteng, a heavily armed pirate cargo ship out of reach of the SDU.

Investigating Lam's salvaged PDA, Qiu and the player discover a link between Krait and Ares Macrotecnology, who intends to wrest the HKPF from Mitsuhama. Following a lead to a warehouse in Tai Po, the player and Qiu discover Ares hardware, vehicles and machinery that are to be used against the population of Hong Kong as a namesmearing campaign, accelerating Ares' buyout of the HKPF. The player then confronts Krait herself; if they have gathered sufficient evidence, the player can deduce that Krait is actually a mercenary hired by Ares, and convince her to abandon her mission by proving that Ares intends to have her eliminated once their buyout of the HKPF is completed.

In the aftermath, when leaving the warehouse, the player receives a call from Kindly Cheng, where she orders the warehouse burned down, while Qiu wishes the warehouse be left intact as evidence for Mitsuhama, in exchange for restoring the player and Duncan's legal identities. If the player sides with Cheng and destroys the warehouse, Duncan abandons them in disgust, while the player continues their life as a shadowrunner, helping Cheng establish Yellow Lotus dominance in both Hong Kong and Seattle. If the player sides with Qiu, she restores their and Duncan's citizenship statuses, allowing them to return home to Seattle, but leaving the fate of Kindly Cheng and the rest of their team unknown as Yellow Lotus is defeated by the Red Dragon Triad.

== Reception ==
Reception

Aggregate score
Aggregator	Score
Metacritic	81/100

Review scores
Publication	Score
Game Informer	7.5/10
GameSpot	8/10
Hardcore Gamer	4.5/5
IGN	8/10
PC Gamer (US)	70/100
RPGamer	4.5/5
RPGFan	87/100

It received "generally positive reviews", according to review aggregator Metacritic. Gamer Headlines awarded it 8 out of 10, saying "The combat, the dialogue, the music, everything that we have come to expect from a Shadowrun video game is in Shadowrun: Hong Kong." PC World awarded it four out of five stars, saying "Shadowrun: Hong Kong isn't the best RPG Harebrained Schemes has put out, but it's still a great game in its own right." PC Gamer awarded it 70%, saying "Regardless, Shadowrun: Hong Kong is a spectacular story of deceit and poisonous evil that will lure you through the most indulgent settings yet seen in the cRPG renaissance. For the price, the scale is giddying, but Shadowrun is starting to cry out for innovation—these are new (quite excellent) assets and a fresh script retrofitted to a two-year-old game." IGN stated that "Shadowrun: Hong Kong doesn't sport many new elements, but it delivers an enjoyable tactical RPG experience nonetheless". The game's soundtrack, composed by Jon Everist, was also praised for its individuality and versatility, which combined an effective mix of traditional Chinese instruments with modern western orchestral and electronic elements. The soundtrack was nominated for the "Best Original Score of 2015" by Video Game Music Online.
