= Star Traders: Frontiers =

2018 video game

- Developer: Trese Brothers
- Publisher: Trese Brothers
- Engine: Cocos2d
- Platforms: Microsoft Windows, iOS, Android
- Release: NA: August 1, 2018
- Genres: Space trading, role-playing
- Mode: Single-player

Star Traders: Frontiers is a hybrid space trading and tactical role-playing game designed by Trese Brothers, a two-man independent video game studio. Players control a spaceship captain in an open world setting.

== Gameplay ==
Players take the role of a starship captain in a space opera-style universe, playing anything from an amoral pirate to a peaceful diplomat. Players can create their own character or use a preset. When creating a custom character, players choose from several backgrounds, which give them various bonuses, such as making trading or combat easier. The captain's spaceship can also be customized, and the crew comprises people with unique skills and personalities. Crew members can die in combat or leave if they become dissatisfied. As they gain experience, their skills can improve. The game's setting is procedurally generated. This results in dynamic story lines, which are relayed to the player through rumors. For example, the player may hear about a war between two factions and a resulting embargo, which can be exploited by smugglers and privateers. The game does not revolve around the player, and these opportunities are not available beyond the point at which the story line ends. These opportunities are often related to a captain's reputation. Captains who have a reputation for reliability with a certain faction will receive more jobs with them. Completing these jobs will often be at the expense of a rival faction, causing a reputation hit with them. Ship combat is tactical and turn-based. The game features optional permadeath.

== Development ==
Philadelphia-based developers Andrew and Cory Trese had previously designed a role-playing game they used as a base for the Star Traders series, which began as mobile games. Frontiers had its genesis when the brothers realized that the game engine they wrote for their earliest game could not implement some of the feature requests that they liked. The game was successfully crowdfunded, which they attributed to building up a strong community with their previous games. Releasing the game via early access gave them feedback on many features. The game originally enforced more hardcore elements of roguelike games, such as permadeath and no save points. When the community asked for these elements to be made optional, the Treses obliged. To encourage emergent gameplay, non-player characters were initially given significant freedom in procedurally generated content, such as killing other characters they dislike. This had to be scaled back to prevent characters from rampantly assassinating plot-important characters and closing off story lines to players. To keep the game's procedurally generated content from feeling stale, they designed rules to encourage what they considered to be interesting stories and mixed in narrative content. Influences included the works of Isaac Asimov and Frank Herbert.

Star Traders: Frontiers left early access on August 1, 2018. The game was ported to iOS and Android in January 2019. Mod support was added in August 2021. The mobile version does not use in-app purchases, and the Trese brothers dislike paid DLC. Instead, they offer free content updates, which they believe encourages more sales.

== Reception ==
According to Metacritic, the iOS version of the game received "universal acclaim". Reviewing the game while it was in early access, Sin Vega of Rock Paper Shotgun enjoyed the game's nuanced portrayal of pirates, which she said were usually a boring gameplay element. Praising the amount of choice in the game, she said that Star Traders: Frontiers "feels like having space adventures" and was "already the best time I've had in space for a very long time". Fraser Brown, writing a review for the same site, said that it is "an exceptional space sim" that "gives you more options than you probably think you need". Rock Paper Shotgun subsequently added the game to its list of the best PC games of the 2010s. PCGamesN included it in their list of best tactical role-playing games, calling it an excellent "open-world adventure in a living world". Both Rock Paper Shotgun and PCGamesN described the post-game content and support as noteworthy. Reviewing the Android version, Pete Leavitt wrote in his review for RPGFan that it is "one of the truest examples of role playing" and is a rare example of a game that gives each player a unique experience. Joe Robinson of Pocket Tactics described it as an excellent port from the PC, and the site included the game on their list of best mobile RPGs. Leif Johnson included it in Macworld's list of best iOS games from 2019, praising the game's unique personality and ability to absorb influences without being derivative of them.
