= Shadowrun Returns =

2013 video game

- Developer: Harebrained Schemes
- Publisher: Harebrained Schemes
- Director: Jordan Weisman
- Producer: Brian Poel
- Designers: Trevor King-Yost; Kevin Maloney; Mike Mulvihill
- Programmer: Chris Kohnert
- Artist: Mike McCain
- Composers: Gavin Parker; Marshall Parker; Sam Powell; Jim Soldi
- Series: Shadowrun
- Engine: Unity
- Platforms: Microsoft Windows; OS X Linux iOS; Android; Nintendo Switch; PlayStation 4 PlayStation 5 Xbox One; Xbox Series X/S
- Release: Windows, OS X: WW: July 25, 2013; iOS, Android: WW: September 26, 2013; Linux: WW: October 30, 2013; Switch, PS4, PS5, XONE, XSX/S: WW: June 21, 2022
- Genre: Tactical role-playing
- Mode: Single-player

Shadowrun Returns is a 2013 tactical role-playing game developed and published by Harebrained Schemes. It takes place in the science fantasy setting of the Shadowrun tabletop role-playing game. The game was crowd funded through Kickstarter and released for Microsoft Windows, OS X, Linux, iOS, and Android in 2013.

An expansion pack titled Shadowrun: Dragonfall was released in 2014. It was later converted to a standalone release, Shadowrun: Dragonfall – Director's Cut. In 2015, Harebrained Schemes launched another Kickstarter campaign to partially fund their next game, Shadowrun: Hong Kong. Similar to the Dragonfall – Director's Cut edition, Hong Kong was released in 2015 as a standalone release built using an upgraded version of the Shadowrun Returns engine. A remastered compilation game including Shadowrun Returns, Shadowrun Dragonfall: Director's Cut, and Shadowrun: Hong Kong was released on Windows, Nintendo Switch, PlayStation 4, PlayStation 5, Xbox One, and Xbox Series X/S on June 21, 2022.

== Gameplay ==
The game features isometric graphics, similar to 1993's Shadowrun for the SNES.

=== Character generation ===
The player can customize their character's gender and appearance. There are five races to choose from: humans, elves, dwarves, orcs, and trolls. The game lacks traditional character classes, but players may optionally play as one of six pregenerated archetypes: street samurai, cybernetically-enhanced warriors who focus on weapon mastery; the spell-casting mages; deckers, who focus primarily on computer hacking; shamans, who summon spirits to assist them in battle; riggers, who control mechanical drones; and physical adepts, who are magically-enhanced monks.

As the story progresses, the player is given character points, known as "karma", to spend on improving their characters. If the player chose an archetype, it controls what skills and equipment the character starts with, but any character can gain any skill (e.g., deckers can spend karma to gain a shaman's summoning abilities). Besides the player character, up to three other characters can be hired during missions. Some non-player-characters are required during certain missions.

=== Exploration ===
While gameplay is mostly linear, some exploration is possible while completing objectives. The player can converse with various characters; different statistics and skills give new dialogue options, affect quest progression, or give different rewards.

The player can interact with the environment in some ways. For instance, pushing aside objects or hacking terminals to find hidden rooms, gaining access to new routes to their main objective or finding items to use or sell. Mages can see magical ley lines, which enhance their abilities, and shamans summon spirits in designated places. Deckers can enter a virtual reality world known as the Matrix at specific points. The decker's avatar engages in a minigame where they fight ICs and enemy deckers while trying to gather data and hack devices. For example, a decker may turn off elevators to stop enemy reinforcements or turn them on to progress further.

=== Combat ===
Combat is turn based and includes tactical elements, such as taking cover. Players control the actions of their team followed by the enemies taking theirs. Each action has a cost in terms of action points. Characters start with a base of two action points per turn and later gain a third point. They can gain or lose action points based on abilities, spells or items. Action points are used in activities such as moving, firing a weapon, reloading, or using a spell or item.

Each character carries up to three weapons and can switch between them at no cost. Weapons have different attacks, depending on the weapon and characters' skills. Ammunition is unlimited but ranged weapons need to be reloaded. Riggers can equip drones like weapons and use their action points to manually control them, attacking enemies or healing allies.

A character with shaman abilities can summon one additional allied spirit to the field, either through consumable items or special points where spirits linger. Managing a spirit lowers the shaman's action points just like a drone does for a rigger. Depending on how much power the shaman imparts on them and how long they have been summoned, these spirits have a chance to break free and become hostile or flee.

The player character may develop focus in one specific archetype or balance advancement between combat, magical and drone capability. Even with the required skills, equipment and action points, one character may not simultaneously field both a drone and a spirit.

== Plot ==
The game ships with a campaign called "Dead Man's Switch". Further campaigns can be downloaded from external websites.

=== Dead Man's Switch ===
Set in the year 2054 after magic has reentered the world, player assumes the role of a shadowrunner who receives a pre-recorded message from his or her old shadowrunner accomplice, Sam Watts, which was triggered by a dead man's switch embedded within his body. Sam's message states that he has 100,000 nuyen being held in escrow as a reward should the player bring whoever was responsible for his death to justice. Upon arriving in Seattle, the runner discovers that Sam is the latest victim of the Emerald City Ripper, a serial killer who has been surgically removing organs from their victims. Afterwards the runner meets Jake Armitage, the protagonist of the SNES Shadowrun game, who provides some leads to investigate.

After receiving help from Coyote, a female human bartender/shadowrunner who first asked for assistance in a private war against those who make "Better-Than-Life" ("BTL") chips, the runner discovers that the Ripper is a male elf named Silas Forsberg whose victims were those who had a transplanted organ from Sam's mother. After killing Silas, the player learns he was directed to commit the Ripper murders by Jessica Watts, Sam's twin sister. Sam and Jessica had lived a comfortable life before their father's death, and despite his best efforts early on to live a decent life, he cracked under the pressure and spent the family savings on drugs and alcohol. He eventually became a shadowrunner to make ends meet, and to further fuel his self-destructive habits.

The runner confronts Jessica but she escapes. The runner finds that Jessica is a high-ranking member of the Universal Brotherhood, an international New Age organization that attracts the disenfranchised. The runner and Coyote investigate the restricted areas of the facility and discover that the Universal Brotherhood is itself a front for a cult trying to create an insect spirit hive. Jessica is revealed to be a shaman who is one of the few who are aware of the Brotherhood's true nature and she unleashes extra-dimensional insect spirits that cannot be killed. The team flees, rescuing a woman named Mary-Louise who is designated to become "the queen", similar to a queen bee.

Mary-Louise connects the team with her boyfriend, a decker going by the alias Baron Samedi, who organizes a shadowrun on Telestrian Industries to steal a sample of Project Aegis; a chemical weapon capable of killing the insect spirits. The runner acquires the sample but is captured while trying to escape and is brought before James Telestrian III. When it is revealed that the runner rescued Mary-Louise, who is Telestrian's daughter, he decides instead of punishing the runner to hire him or her to lead a team to deploy Project Aegis along with the immortal elf Harlequin. Telestrian explains that Jessica's ritual to bring an insect spirit queen into this world requires a blood relative. His father had an affair with Melinda Watts, Sam and Jessica's mother, thus Mary-Louise was a viable candidate since they shared the same grandfather. Should Jessica perform the ritual on a blood relative, it would result in a full-scale invasion of the extra-dimensional insect spirits.

Telestrian gives the runner and Harlequin each a shotgun able to fire capsules filled with the remaining Aegis compound, which can kill the insect spirits. The team infiltrates the hive and they fight their way into the heart of the inner sanctum where Telestrian's sister, Lynne, has volunteered to let the queen take over her body, as she is also a blood relation to Jessica. The team disrupts the summoning by seriously wounding Jessica and killing most of the insect spirits inside the hive. The queen spirit abandons Jessica, and the player is given the option to kill her or arrest her. Lynne survives, but is arrested and eventually sent to a mental hospital.

The game concludes with Armitage, Coyote, Harlequin, and James Telestrian III discussing the fallout of the raid, with Harlequin musing that other Brotherhood chapters across the world also hold hives similar to the one in Seattle. When the runner tries to collect the money for bringing Sam's killer to justice, Sam's prerecorded message asks the runner to apologize to Jessica for what he put her through, and reveals that he never actually had any money in escrow.

An epilogue describes the immediate events after the game, tying in with the larger Shadowrun canon. Media coverage of the events left out details of shadowrunners and insect spirits, likely due to the influence of the Brotherhood. Aegis was eventually developed into a product called "Fluorescing Astral Bacteria-3", or "FAB-3". The Chicago Universal Brotherhood hive is botched and the city is largely sealed up behind a wall to keep the rampaging insect spirits inside the city. FAB-3 is used some time later to cleanse Chicago of its insect spirit infestation.

=== Dragonfall ===
In the main campaign of the game's first expansion, players assume the role of a Shadowrunner who has recently arrived in the anarchic free state of Berlin to join a team headed by an old colleague, Monika Schäfer.

=== Hong Kong ===
In 2056, the player travels to the Hong Kong Free Enterprise Zone, meeting with their foster brother Duncan and his superior officer Carter, who agree to investigate their foster father's mysterious message, are ambushed by the HKPF, and escape to and continue their investigation from a small boat village built on the outskirts of a modern Kowloon Walled City, a nightmarish slum built on the ruins of the original.

== Development ==
The game's lead designer is Jordan Weisman, the creator of the Shadowrun tabletop role-playing game, who was inspired to create a game with a "more authentic tone" after the release of the 2007 Shadowrun first-person shooter, which he was not involved with. Weisman was originally inspired to create a video game in the Shadowrun universe after reacquiring the rights to it from Microsoft through his Smith & Tinker startup company in 2007. Unfortunately, due to restrictions on the license, he could not obtain the backing of other publishers for new Shadowrun projects. The success of crowd funding financing models then motivated him to obtain funding for his project, Shadowrun Returns, through the Kickstarter crowd funding platform.

The project was opened to pledges in April 2012 and met its funding goal of $400,000 within 28 hours. Upon reaching the $1 million mark, Weisman recorded a video for the Kickstarter project stating that if the project were to reach $1.5 million, the developers would develop a "backers-only exclusive mission which will tie together the stories of the SNES title and the Sega Genesis title." This goal was achieved but Kickstarter backers demanded that the mission be made available to everyone, so Harebrained Schemes announced that the mission would be available to them for a limited amount of time before being available to the public. The funding period ended on 29 April 2012, by which time the project had gathered $1,895,772 worth of pledges. The success of the campaign made Complex rank it number eight on their list of the biggest video game wins and fails on Kickstarter in 2012.

The game was developed for Windows, Mac and Linux platforms, as well as the iPad and Android tablets. Weisman justified the addition of tablets as a development platform alongside more traditional development for the desktop because "the style of game we want to make lends itself best to these platforms," and "the gameplay determined the platform."

Weisman announced the game as a "graphically rich 2D turn-based single player game with deep story interaction, meaningful character development, and highly-contextual tactical combat." It is accompanied by a level editor for players to create their own content. The game implements character types from the role-playing game, including Street Samurai, Combat Mage, Decker (i.e. hacker), Shaman, Rigger and Adept. In collaboration with Cliffhanger Productions, characters and plotlines of Shadowrun Returns will be carried on to Shadowrun Online, which is set approximately 20 years later and will be based upon the video game multiplayer aspect Shadowrun has potential for.

The music was composed by Marshall Parker and Sam Powell who were involved in the original SNES and Sega Genesis iterations, as well as the independent composer Gavin Parker, whose previous work includes Test Drive Unlimited, Viva Piñata and Scene it?. The official launch trailer was released on July 18, which included voice talent by Charles Legget and music by composer Jon Everist, who went on to compose the majority of the music for Shadowrun: Dragonfall and all of the critically acclaimed score for Shadowrun: Hong Kong.

== Release ==
The game originally had an estimated delivery date of January 2013, but the designers stated that the additional content to be added after meeting stretch goals will require more time. On June 18, 2013 the developers announced an official release date of July 25, 2013. It was released on July 25, 2013 through Steam, with a DRM-free download available to Kickstarter backers only. Initially the DRM-free version was only available to backers as the developing team managed to get an exception only for Kickstarter backers while licensing the Shadowrun brand, but on November 12, 2013 Harebrained Schemes announced that they had reached an agreement to release DRM-free versions of Shadowrun Returns and future expansions, as well as sell them through GOG.com.

== Reception ==
Reception

Aggregate score
Aggregator	Score
Metacritic	PC: 76/100 iOS: 85/100

Review scores
Publication	Score
Destructoid	8.5/10
Eurogamer	8/10
Game Informer	8.5/10
GameSpot	7/10
GamesRadar+	3.5/5
Giant Bomb	4/5
Hardcore Gamer	4.5/5
IGN	7.3/10
Joystiq	4/5
PC Gamer (US)	74/100
Polygon	7/10
RPGamer	75/100
TouchArcade	4.5/5
VentureBeat	85/100

Shadowrun Returns received generally favorable reviews upon release, garnering a 76/100 on review aggregation website Metacritic. IGN reviewer Dan Stapleton stated that the game's best days were ahead of it, and they will be more interested in it "a year from now, after the community has used the included mod tools to build on it, than in what it is today."

Several reviewers, including Len Hafer for PC Gamer, criticized the game's save system, which saves the game only at area transitions. Functionality to allow the player to save the game at any time was omitted because of development resource constraints, but was later added in the Shadowrun Dragonfall expansion.
