= Mimpi (video game) =

2013 video game

- Developer: Silicon Jelly
- Publisher: Crescent Moon Games
- Director: Jaroslav Stehlík
- Designer: Matěj Moravec
- Writer: Martin Vaňo
- Engine: Unity
- Platforms: Windows; Android iOS; OS X
- Release: iOS: October 8, 2013; OSX: December 12, 2013; Android: December 19, 2013; Microsoft Windows: 20 January 2015
- Genres: Adventure game Puzzle video game Platform game
- Mode: Single-player

Mimpi is a 2013 video game developed by Czech company Silicon Jelly. It is a mix of an adventure puzzle and a platform game.

The sequel Mimpi Dreams was released in 2015.

== Development ==
The game was announced in January 2013. The development started approximately in October 2012.

The developers decided to fund the game on Indiegogo. The game was placed there in February but until March 4, it gained just 112 USD of its 10,000 goal. The developers decided to finish the game anyway. The original release date was scheduled for March 2013.

Most of the game was developed by designer Matěj Moravec. Programmers started their work when he finished the first four levels. The music was done by company Sype Studios. In the course of development the game went through many changes. For example, it was longer and easier than planned.

The game was finished in October and the developers found a publisher in Crescent Moon Games. The iOS version was released on October 8. It was followed by an OS X version on December 12. On December 19, a version for Android was released. The game was also Greenlighted for release on Steam. The Windows version was released on 20 January 2015.

== Gameplay ==
The game combines platforming and adventure elements. The player controls Mimpi but also can interact with an environment similarly to point-and-click adventure games

Mimpi is a side-scrolling platformer. The player controls a dog, Mimpi, with directional arrows. The player can also interact with surroundings by tapping, swiping, and dragging on them. There are plenty of puzzles that the player has to get through. The game is set in 8 different worlds that differ not only by visuals but also by gameplay. In a sea level, for example, your character is in a bubble and has to avoid touching anything. In the course of the game you can find bones. They are used to unlock various illustrations.

== Plot ==
The story is told by animations without written or voiced dialogues.

The game follows story of a little dog, Mimpi, whose owner disappears when he enjoys his nap during a day. He sets up to find him. He meets strange creatures on his way and some of them are hostile. He gets through multiple environments and overcomes multiple dangers. In the end he finds out that his real task is not to find his master but to help himself. When he went for a walk with his master they met some woman and his master didn't pay any attention. Mimpi ate a Chocolate Bunny. Because of it Mimpi got a fever and it is revealed everything happening is just a toxic psychosis. In the end Mimpi gets to his own stomach and defeats the Bunny. Mimpi then wakes up on his master's lap.

== Spin-off titles ==
Silicon Jelly, along with publisher Crescent Moon Games, released in November 2013 three spin-off titles. Mimpi Volleyball, Mimpi Signal and Mimpi Hidden Objects. All of them are free.

Mimpi Hidden Objects is a hidden objects game. The player there goes through portraits of scenes that depict the world of Mimpi. There he has to search for objects that are randomly generated. There are seven scenes known from the original game.

In Mimpi Volleyball the player plays a volleyball against creatures featured in the original game. Every match is set in an environment from the original game. The game features 7 levels, 8 creatures to play against, 7 balls and 7 costumes.

The last spin-off is Mimpi Signal. The player has to find the right wave by using three different controls to manipulate wavelength, speed or amplitude of the wave.

== Reception ==
Mimpi received generally positive reviews from critics upon its release. It was praised for its visuals gameplay and music. On the other hand, it was criticised for its controls and difficulty of some puzzles.
