= Shadowrun Chronicles: Boston Lockdown =

2015 video game

- Game logo
- Developer: Cliffhanger Productions
- Publisher: Nordic Games
- Producer: Jan Wagner
- Series: Shadowrun
- Platforms: Linux, Windows, OS X
- Release: WW: April 28, 2015
- Genres: Turn-based tactics, isometric shooter
- Mode: Multiplayer

Shadowrun Chronicles: Boston Lockdown (originally marketed as Shadowrun Online) was a turn-based tactical video game developed by Cliffhanger Productions and published by Nordic Games as part of Jordan Weisman's cyberpunk Shadowrun fictional universe. With the servers shut down, the game stopped working on November 30, 2018.

== Development and release ==
Following the success of the Shadowrun Returns Kickstarter campaign, Cliffhanger Productions initiated a similar campaign to crowdsource $500,000 in July 2012, and pledged to deliver a closed beta version of Shadowrun Online for contributors around May 2013.

=== Director's Cut ===
Shadowrun Chronicles: INFECTED! Director's Cut combines the two games Shadowrun Chronicles: Boston Lockdown and the INFECTED! campaigns into one game. It was released on Steam on December 10, 2015. A Missions DLC was released for INFECTED! Director's Cut on February 25, 2016.

=== Game server shut-down ===
On November 30, 2018, the servers were shut down, citing the license running out and the game making barely enough to keep the servers running. Due to the license only allowing online games, the game needs the servers to work, even in a "play alone" mode using NPCs instead of other players in missions.

Despite different expectations, Microsoft had no interest in renewing the license and "persistent ransomware attacks" had been increasing the cost of running the server.

== Reception ==
Reception

Aggregate score
Aggregator	Score
Metacritic	61/100

Review scores
Publication	Score
Destructoid	7/10
GameSpot	3/10
Hardcore Gamer	3.5/5
IGN	6.5/10
Shacknews	7/10

IGN awarded the game a score of 6.5 out of 10, saying "smart co-op partners make Shadowrun Chronicles: Boston Lockdown's tactical combat work, but anything less falls short." It has a 61/100 rating on Metacritic. GameSpot awarded it a score of 3 out of 10, saying "Shadowrun Chronicles isn't just a bad Shadowrun game. It's a bad game. That it comes from a series with such an exceptional pedigree and plenty of exceptional recent successes just makes the disappointment that much more bitter." Shacknews, by contrast, gave it a 7 out of 10, praising the story, setting, strategy, and multiplayer, while criticizing the server issues, incomplete game systems, pointless death timer, and rewards that weren't proportionate to mission difficulty.
