= Game Developers Session =

Czech video game development conference

Game Developers Session (GDS)

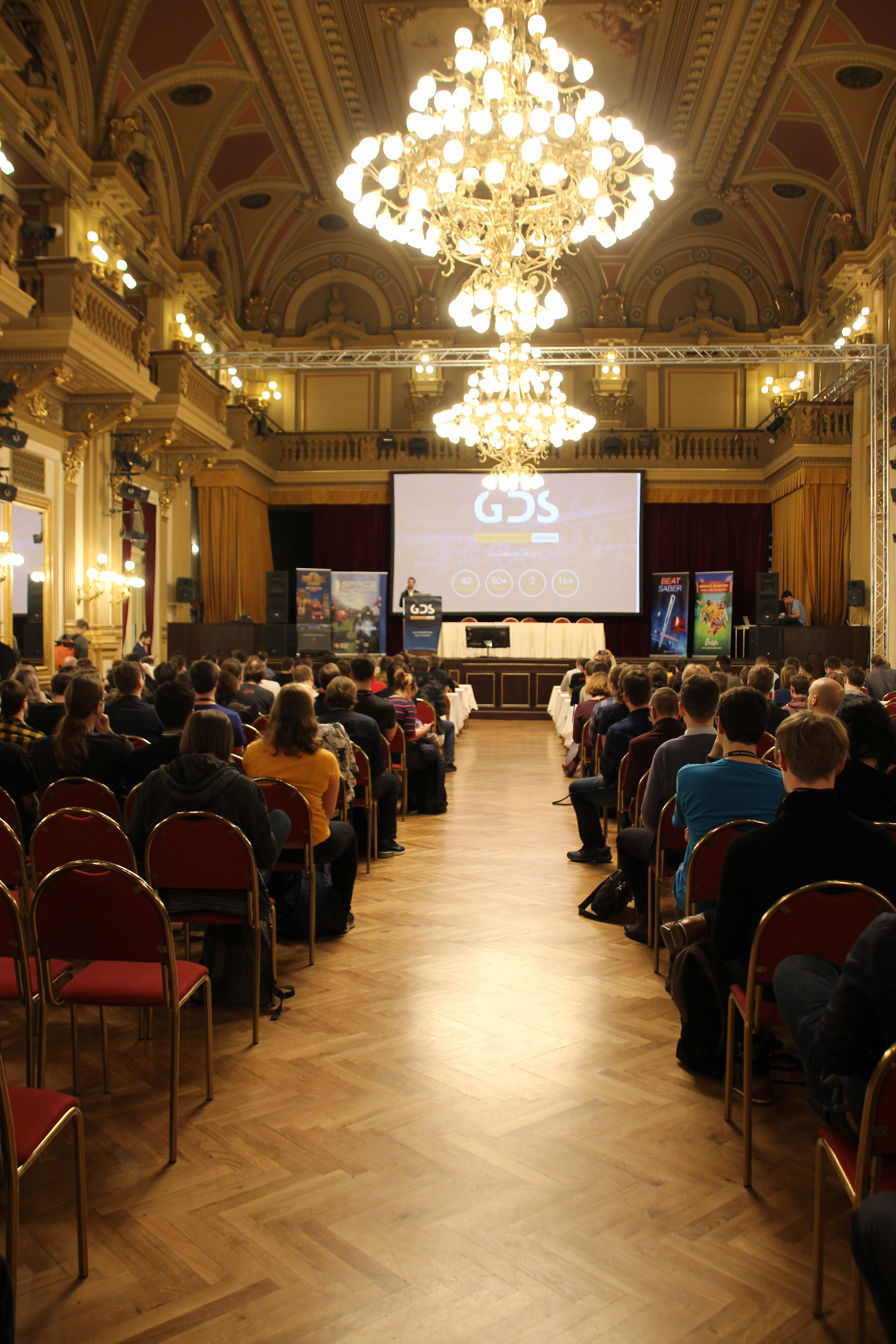
- GDS hall audience view
- Status: Active
- Genre: Video game development
- Venue: National House of Smichov
- Location: Prague
- Country: Czech Republic
- Inaugurated: 4 July 2003; 23 years ago
- Next event: 9 December 2023; 2 years ago
- Organizer: Eventia
- Website: www.gdsession.com

The Game Developers Session (GDS) is an annual Czech conference on video game development.

It is the oldest conference dedicated to game development, technology, businesses, and marketing in Central Europe. It has been organized annually since 2003, most being held in Prague in the Czech Republic. It is notable for being the first event of its kind in the city with a tradition spanning around 20 years.

In 2009, the conference gained popularity outside of the Czech Republic by presenting a set of lectures by developers from 2K Czech, mainly on the technical background of the game Mafia II. From there, GDS began to grow, shaping the game development community within the country.

GDS has hosted 900+ game developers, producers, and journalists with over 150 game studios participating every year. GDS includes the presentation of projects and talks from speakers from art, business, design, programming, and other backgrounds.

== Social media & press ==
The GDS is backed by the Czech Game Developers’ Association. It represents an interconnected platform in the context of the European game industry and brings professional communities together from Slovakia, Slovenia, and Poland.

GDS has had the support of the City hall of Prague for many consecutive years.

In previous years the event was attended by government officials, investors, and government agencies including the Minister of Culture of the Czech Republic and the Director of The Business and Investment Development Agency CzechInvest.

== Venue and format ==
The conference is designed as an international event. It is open and accessible to foreigners. The main program line and official conference's language channels are in English.

The 2022 GDS presented 40 speakers over two days at the historical venue of National House Smíchov in Prague, with more than 1000 visitors confirmed. Sponsors included big names like Beat Games, Wargaming, and Microsoft.

== Universities and schools ==
In order to help the next generation of game developers, GDS cooperates with Czech universities and schools. The list of GDS educational partners is growing every year.

== Contents ==
The GDS conference is an event where game creators meet regularly with producers, game professionals, and journalists.

The conference usually takes place for three days. Before the conference, there is a game jam in co-operation with Charles University in Prague. The core program of GDS is divided into two parallel lines of talks. During both days game development teams present their projects and current topics in the field. Also, one day is usually dedicated to independent developers to introduce their projects to the professionals and the public. Another component of GDS is the career fair.
