= Shadowrun (1994 video game) =

1994 video game

- Cover art was taken from Larry Elmore's cover art for the 1st edition of the tabletop game
- Developer: BlueSky Software
- Publisher: Sega
- Producers: Scott Berfield; Tony Van
- Designers: Tony Van; John Fulbright; Scott Berfield; Heinrich Michaels
- Artist: Dana Christianson
- Writer: Jim Long
- Composer: Sam Powell
- Series: Shadowrun
- Platform: Sega Genesis
- Release: 1994
- Genre: Action role-playing
- Mode: Single-player

Shadowrun is an action role-playing game for the Sega Genesis, released in 1994 in North America and Asia only. It was adapted from the cyberpunk role-playing game Shadowrun by FASA, and was developed by BlueSky Software. The game is the second video game adapted from Shadowrun, and has a more open ended style of gameplay than its 1993 Super NES counterpart, Shadowrun by Beam Software.

== Gameplay ==
Shadowrun's battle gameplay

Shadowrun offers the player an open style of gameplay, where one controls the main character, Joshua, in a top-down third person perspective during both exploration and combat. Battles are real time, and although of varying difficulty, tend to be relatively short. Initially, the player is restricted to a single area of the game, but shortly gains access to almost all other areas. Access to other areas is accomplished primarily by taxi, although various restrictions and other modes of travel also exist, such as requiring a visa or bypassing the visa check with the use of a helicopter.

As in most role-playing video games, the characters' skills and attributes can be improved. However, Shadowrun uses a unique "Karma" system, which allows full character customization. Karma, roughly equivalent to experience, is earned for successfully completing a run, killing enough enemies, or advancing the game's plot. Karma is then spent on specific stats as determined by the player. To earn money and Karma, the player must participate in shadowruns, illegal jobs provided by pseudo-anonymous contractors who are, within the legal boundaries of their work, referred to simply as Mr. Johnsons. Mr. Johnsons usually are corporate liaisons who want their bosses' dirty work done without compromising them. All Mr. Johnsons work in backroom booths in different clubs and bars through the city. Depending on the Johnson, they will randomly offer different types of jobs such as raiding gang hangouts, search & retrieval, extractions, courier missions, ghoul hunting, or Matrix runs.

Each mission will vary on the specifics to meet the requirements and location such as Megacorp headquarters or even the LoneStar's main building. Different Mr. Johnsons have varying levels of difficulty and pay for their jobs, which can be influenced by the player's negotiation statistic. (Note: In this game, the term "Mr. Johnson" is used where the word "fixer" would be used in the tabletop game. In the tabletop game, the player would know the handle of his fixer but the actual client would remain anonymous, hence "Mr. Johnson". In this video game, the fixers are known both by their handles and "Mr. Johnson," while also revealing the clients’ names to the player.)

At the start of the game, the player can choose for Joshua to be either a samurai, a decker, or a gator shaman. These only determine Joshua's beginning statistics and equipment; samurai begin focused on combat, deckers on use of the Matrix and electronics, and shamans on the use of magic. Over the course of the game, the player may choose to continue to focus on one particular skill or set of skills or branch out into other areas; however, only characters who choose to start as a shaman (and allied mages) can use magic and getting too many "cyberware" implants will reduce its effectiveness.

To help the player make things easier during hard shadowruns, Joshua can also recruit other characters to help him in his shadowruns. These are called shadowrunners, and can also be customized as Joshua can. The price of hiring a shadowrunner depends on the duration of the contract, as well as the runner's attitude toward the player. Shadowrunners can be hired for a single run or for a lifetime for ten times the price. The player can only directly control one character at a time; other characters (including Joshua) are controlled by the computer's AI. If the player completes the mission successfully and the shadowrunner was signed on for one job, they return to their location and can be hired back cheaper than before. If the squad is wiped out, however, the runner will be upset and charge more for their services.

The primary method of combat in Shadowrun is the use of firearms, although magic plays a significant role in combat in both an offensive and defensive capacity. Shadowrun keeps track of ammunition; if a character runs out they may have to resort to melee. The use of magic, on the other hand, is kept in check by damaging the player for casting high-level spells: the player can mitigate or even eliminate this through the use of items, or by reducing the success chance and/or power of the spell. While virtually useless when used by untrained, physically weak characters, with high skills and strength-boosting cyberware and implanted close-combat weapons (like spurs or hand razors), melee combat can be highly effective against most enemies all the way to the end of the game. Grenades are also available, though their effectiveness relative to other methods of combat is limited.

A variety of shops exist throughout the game, providing guns and modifications, cyberware, spells and spell upgrades, cyberdecks and utilities, and other miscellaneous items. In addition to the numerous shops in the game, the player can collect a variety of contacts who provide the player with information, services, or (frequently illegal) goods. Through these contacts Joshua late in the game can join either The Mafia or Yakuza. In Seattle, there are three local racial gangs that have well-defined territories: Halloweeners (humans of Redmond Barrens), Eye-Fivers (elves of Penumbra District) and Orks (orcs of Puyallup Barrens). The player can visit each of these gangs, and pay to speak with their leaders (or be asked to do so, depending on his reputation). There, Joshua can ask for protection from the gangs' random attacks, as well as for the phone number of their allegiance bosses. After Joshua's reputation has been highly upgraded, and after he obtains the numbers of these bosses, he can contact the Yakuza and Mafia, and pledge loyalty to either one of them himself, obtaining specific benefits and exclusive items and discounts. On the other hand, Lone Star, the ubiquitous private security force contracted by the government to provide police services, can not be contacted directly.

=== The Matrix ===
Shadowrun's Matrix system gameplay

In tone with the Shadowrun pen-and-paper universe, certain characters can also explore the Matrix, a global computer network that can be accessed through cyberterminals. It is there that the player, in a third-person perspective, can hack networked systems for various purposes. However, in order to do so, a series of intrusion countermeasures must be dealt with, the difficulty of which is proportionate to the system being attacked: the high-end systems of law enforcement and influential corporations will be significantly more difficult to break than that of a nameless hotel. The cyberdeck carried by Joshua can be used by any shadowrunner and, like real computers, has a variety of statistics, such as memory, storage, and loading speed. These can be improved individually through upgrades or all at once by purchasing a more advanced model. Primarily, the cyberdeck's use, aside from entering the Matrix, is to hold various utilities to hack the networks properly (such as Masking, Attack, and Analyzing programs) and to save data downloaded from the Matrix itself.

While inside the Matrix, the interface changes. The shadowrunner who entered it is replaced by a persona, the character's reflection in the cyberworld, which navigates the network. Networks are made up of a series of nodes: geometric shapes representing different facets of the system, such as the CPU or data stores. Each node has a different function: the CPU, for example, can cancel system alerts and crash the entire system. The difficulty of defeating a particular node is determined by its color. Each node is (usually) protected by intrusion countermeasures called IC (pronounced "Ice"). These are designed to forcibly dump the persona from the system by various means, sometimes resulting in the decker taking physical damage in the real world, to the point of being incapacitated. IC appear as different figures covering the nodes and have different effects depending on their type. Matrix runs consist of stealing or erasing data, or crashing a system via the CPU. During corporate infiltrations, the player can use internal cyberterminals to shut off the building's security, making the run easier. In addition to its role in shadowruns, the Matrix can be used as a direct source of income by pilfering data from systems and selling it. Files sell for a semi-random price based on the system of origin and difficulty rating of the node the data was stolen from; a single file can sell for as much as 12,000 nuyen, or turn out to be completely worthless.

== Plot ==
=== Setting ===
The game is set in the Shadowrun universe, in the 2050s, a time when the blending of technology and human flesh is common. It is around the time the Matrix, a huge computer network, came online, with the ability to jack into its cyberspace directly. It was also a time of magic renewal: a phenomenon known as The Awakening occurred, where magic returned into the world. Sorcery was once again possible, and slowly and seemingly at random humans began to mutate into orcs, dwarves, elves or trolls. This time of upheaval was not without political conflicts: mega-corporations began to control the world. But with their magic, native shamans threatened them and the world geography came to a complete change. The Amerindians and Elves reclaimed an area called Salish-Shidhe, close to the free city of Seattle, a major city in the newly formed United Canadian and American States.

Shadowrun's story takes place in these areas, both the wilderness of the Salish-Shidhe and the pollution of Seattle, controlled by mega corporations. Seattle itself is divided in many areas:

- Redmond Barrens: Dark slums only active because of the Shiawase Atomics Nuclear Plant and the Hollywood Correctional Facility, as well as a few other generic shops. The Halloweeners gang resides there.
- Downtown Seattle: The city center, with many bars and corporation buildings. Lone Star, Seattle's police, patrols every hour to ensure order. The Space Needle lies here.
- Penumbra District: A high-class area; only top clubs and corporate buildings can be found in this district. It also houses Lone Star's offices, as well as the Eye-Fivers gang.
- Renraku Arcology: An enclosed city on the power of Renraku Corporation, built inside a pyramid. Many top-class shops can be found here, as well as the massive Renraku offices. Renraku uses their own security team to keep order in their Arcology.
- Puyallup Barrens: Home to the Ork's gang, as well as factories, black market stores, a number of shady bars and hotels.
- Council Island: Neutral lands between the city and the wilderness, and usually peaceful. Orks and humans have an embassy where they live without hatred or discrimination. A bar, stores and a clinic can also be found in the Island. It also has a post where citizens can ask for a visa to enter the Salish-Shidhe.
- Salish-Shidhe Indian Lands / Elven Lands of Sinsearach: Amerindians and elves live in peace with nature in these savage and dangerous lands. Many dangerous creatures can be found here, as well as the occasional hunting party. The Salish-Shidhe and Sinsearach are connected through a complex network of caves that house many paths and secrets. A visa is needed to (legally) travel to the Salish-Shidhe.
- Ellisia's Tomb: The last resting place of the founder of the Sinsearach and the "greatest elven hero", it lies deep within the Salish Shide and the Sinsearach, its exact location lost with time. It can not be accessed until the end of the game.

The corporations that exist within this Shadowrun's world are Lone Star Security Services (law enforcement agency in the city of Seattle), Fuchi Industrial Electronics (cyberterminals and Matrix technology), Mitsuhama Computer Technologies (computers and robotics), Ares Macrotechnology (weapons and defense industries), Aztechnology (magic equipment) and Renraku Computer Systems (computer technology).

=== Story ===
Shadowrun's story begins on January 31, 2058, in Seattle, United Canadian and American States. In the wilderness of the newly reclaimed Amerindian lands of the Salish-Shidhe, a small team of shadowrunners is brutally ambushed by unknown forces. The massacre is over quickly, but is captured in video by one of the slain member's cybereyes; the video is recovered and made national news. The last man to die in the video was a shadowrunner known as Michael, Joshua's brother.

Joshua spends his last nuyen and flies to Seattle, vowing to avenge his brother's death. He arrives at Sea-Tac Airport and traces back Michael's last credstick transaction to "Stoker's Coffin Motel", in the Redmond Barrens. Joshua travels there to inquire about his brother, only to be told by the owner that Michael never paid his bill and in fact has some belongings being held. He strikes a deal with Joshua, and by beginning to do small shadowruns for a small-time Mr. Johnson, called Gunderson, he gains enough money to pay his brother's bills. In Michael's belongings, he finds three "holopix": one of a young woman, Tabatha Shale; of an Amerindian, David Owlfeather, and of Seattle General Hospital Dr. Heaversheen. There is also a low grade cyberdeck, along with a credstick containing 500 nuyen.

From there, the story divides into three branches that the player can go through in any order, either separately or at once. Each branch gives the answer to three main questions: who killed Michael, and under whose orders; what was Michael's last shadowrun; why was Michael killed. Because of the sandbox style of gameplay and the non-linear story, the entire mystery is not revealed until the three main branches are totally completed. Once they are, the plot slowly arises:

- Decades before Michael's death, the Salish-Shidhe lands were reclaimed by a number of Amerindians and Elven heroes; among them was a man known as Ellisia, who founded an elven Council, the Sinsearach, to protect the wilderness from the city's corruption.
- After Ellisia's death, his body was sealed in a mausoleum with a number of magical artifacts to prevent the misuse of Ellisia's magic power.
- It is then that an ancient free spirit entity called Thon, begins a plot to fully penetrate this world using Ellisia. Free spirits are cursed, as Thon needed to replenish his life force or his form in this world would cease to exist. In order to stay alive, Thon seeks out magical artifacts and in destructive rituals, absorbs their energies. With the power of Ellisia's body and artifacts, Thon could become a physical entity.
- Thon begins to use two Mr. Johnsons, Vigore & Jarl, to carry out his plans for him,
- A mega-corporation, Renraku, becomes involved with Thon through Vigore, a corporate support at the time. Renraku begins to work with the free spirit in a top-priority project, "Project THON". The project's leader is Mako Sochou, but he soon is blinded by Thon's promises and betrays Renraku, being replaced by Ito Ogami. Renraku itself plans on manipulating Thon, being the only ones with a map to Ellisia's Tomb.
- By this point, Sinsearach Council member Harlequin sets on a mission to stop Thon from desecrating Ellisia's Tomb and being freed again. To do this, Harlequin asks his apprentice Frosty to hire a Mr. Johnson, Caleb Brightmore, to organize a small team of shadowrunners to go into Ellisia's Tomb and destroy Thon's magic source. Michael is employed in this team.
- Ito Ogami sends a Renraku Strike Team to kill Michael's team; Harlequin is left powerless without his team.

Joshua's mission and investigation eventually leads him to Harlequin himself; but it is not after he completes all stories that the ends meet and he can finally reach Ellisia's tomb, the final stage of the game.

== Characters ==
=== Protagonists ===
- Joshua is the game's protagonist and the player defines much of his personality. However, most of the time he's a casual and somewhat aggressive male, his speech laced with street slang; his perspective, often with bits of sarcasm and irony, drives the game. In the game, Joshua's goal is to avenge and solve the mystery of his brother's death, a goal he can only achieve by making a name for himself as a shadowrunner.
- Michael is Joshua's older brother. Not much is revealed about his personality, but Michael was close and protective over Josh. Michael was an elite shadowrunner, and he and his friends were brutally massacred during a fatal shadowrun by an unknown ambush force. Joshua vows to avenge him.
- Ricky is a modest and somewhat weak dwarf rat shaman. He lived in the city for most of his life, but he had no purpose, mostly because "everybody was larger than him". At some point, the Rat totem reached out to him, showing him that violence was not the only way to success. Ricky's skills are few and only useful for sneaking around. He starts shadowrunning to save enough to get out of Redmond Barrens, where he resides.
- Winston Marrs is an ex-policeman troll samurai, named after the Roman god of war, who appears to be obsessed with violence and loves to shoot guns. So, in order to "get paid for shooting at people", he joined Lone Star, the Seattle police. However, he did not pass his studies and was kicked out of Lone Star. Because of that, Winston holds an understandable grudge against the police. As a Troll, he can become an incredibly effective melee fighter. Winston is playful and lighthearted, and should the player employ him frequently, he develops an affection toward Joshua ("you're the boss, Josh!")
- Trent Delisario is a university dropout human mage. At university, Trent studied magic, but only learned what he calls "parlor tricks". Aspiring for a greater control over the astral plane, he moves to Penumbra District hoping to learn new skills as he shadowruns. Trent appears to know some Japanese, and is helpful and polite, being the only character in the whole game that gives a vidphone number for free.
- Petr Uver is a dwarf decker. Previously employed at a division of the Stuffer Shack, he learned his way around cyberdecks and The Matrix, and soon became displeased with the meager pay of his job. Stealing a cyberdeck, he moved to Puyallup Barrens in order to become a shadowrunner and win easy money.
- Walking Bear is an ork bear shaman, born human in Seattle. She had a happy childhood, until the phenomenon of the Awakening turned her into an ork. Humans began to discriminate against her, so she escaped into the wilderness, where a group of Amerindians taught her the way of the shamans. She soon discovered her potential with the Bear, which she identifies with because of their protective desires. Walking Bear's goal is to protect her tribe, and in order to do so, she works as a shadowrunner to make money for them.
- Phantom is an ex-corporate elf decker. He once worked for an unnamed company that trained him to hack the Matrix. However, he was fired without any pension when an anti-metahuman group demanded the removal of jobs for other races, claiming that they were stealing them from "the pure". As an act of revenge, he used his Matrix training to steal money from his employers' accounts, and began a career as a shadowrunner. He knows Japanese and claims to have made quite a name for himself in cyberspace.
- Ilene Two Fists is a convict human samurai, who was a friend of the Sinsearach Council. She traveled to the Redmond Barrens looking for adventure after leading a safe life. She quickly finds herself with two other shadowrunners against the Ares Corporation with promises of money, but is betrayed when her partners leave her behind after tripping an alarm while trying to infiltrate an Ares facility. Ilene ends up in the Hollywood Correctional Penitentiary, and is eventually rescued by Joshua during the story. She is quick, both talking and fighting.
- Freya Goldenhair is an elf mage. A member of the Cascade Crow tribe, she discovered she had latent magic powers as a child, but her tribe viewed hermetic mages as heretics (as opposed to shamans, that work within the limits of nature). Freya ran away, ending up in the city and working with a radical political group, which hired her to assassinate corporate officials. Her job proved easy and worth the effort, but she soon grew tired of the group's control and broke away from them, becoming a shadowrunner. Freya is flamboyant.
- Rianna Heartbane is an elf decker, whose last name is a pseudonym she took from an ancient elven leader that prophesied the Matrix as "a place where everything and nothing exists; a place where war is fought and blood is shed without weapons." Rianna has been shadowrunning against the Corporations since a very young age, and she feels that it is her personal mission to stop them from gaining any more power than they already have.
- Stark is a human samurai, and the only surviving member of Michael's massacred party. He was raised in the Amerindian lands, and is proud of his heritage, swearing to protect it no matter what. When he heard that strangers were entering the Salish Shidhe, he traveled to the city to investigate the reasons behind this invasion. There, he met Michael, and the two became fast friends, until they both engaged in the fatal shadowrun to stop the invaders. Although not very bright, he is caring and affectionate. At the time of the story's beginning, Stark is agonizing in the depths of the Salish Shidhe, and it's up to Joshua to revive him. Stark will join your team provided you have room, and comes with a decent amount of cyberware and weapons.

=== Antagonists ===
- Thon is a free spirit – an elemental whose summoner was killed – from ancient times, who can only retain his form in reality by seeking magical artifacts and absorbing their energies in destructive rituals, the only way he can replenish his life force. Thon is alive, but barely so, as he is running out of artifacts. With his followers, Thon plans to desecrate the elven hero Ellisia's tomb to use Ellisia's body and artifacts to become a physical entity.
- Mako Sochou is a Renraku executive, and the first leader of "Project THON", a plot to manipulate the information Thon needs to locate Ellisia's tomb, in order to use Thon for Renraku's interests. However, Mako betrays Renraku, and is swiftly replaced.
- Ito Ogami is the second leader of "Project THON". He is known for being cold blooded, and is the one who sent the Strike Team to kill Michael's team. After defeating Ogami, Joshua gains access to Ogami's personal portion of Matrix space, which contains valuable mission information and valuable datafiles. While Ito's system can be repeatably hacked, it still requires a considerable Computer skill and a good deck to hack, as most of the important nodes are Red category (hardest) and are guarded by various forms of black IC (pronounced "ice") (intrusion countermeasures which attack the decker's physical body directly).

=== Other characters ===
- Harlequin is a member of the Sinsearach Council, whose name comes from the tattoos on his face. He knows of Thon's existence and intentions to desecrate elven lore to become fully alive, and carries out a plan to stop him, which results in Michael's death. Joshua eventually meets him, and they team up to stop Thon. He originally appeared in the Shadowrun RPG, in a campaign book of the same name. Harlequin is an immensely powerful elven mage, but does not directly aid Joshua or join his party in the final confrontation with Thon.
- Frosty or Jane Frost, is another member of Sinsearach, and an apprentice (of sorts) of Harlequin. It is she that organizes Michael's shadowrun, and guides him to her master. As with Harlequin, she originally appeared in the RPG (in the Harlequin campaign as well).
- David Owlfeather is an Amerindian Salish-Shidhe ranger, who is very knowledgeable about the wilderness' geography and lore. He was also one of Michael's friends, and one of the last people to see him alive.
- Spirit Eyes, also known as "The Most Wise One", is an Amerindian elder with blank eyes. He possesses immense magical powers, and through a complex ritual, he can determine the identity of Michael's killer, and make an image of him appear in front of Joshua.
- Licourtrix is a feathered serpent dragon, that lives deep in the Salish Shidhe caves, away from civilization. At one point in the game, Joshua must rescue Licourtrix from a Renraku Strike Team that seeks to kill him. Licourtrix, in an omniscient fashion, pledges loyalty to Joshua, promising to aid him one time, and only the one time he truly needs it.
- Ellisia was an ancient elven hero, that helped reclaim the Salish Shidhe lands for the elves and Amerindians. Ellisia founded the Sinsearach Council to protect and defend the Salish Shidhe, and according to the game's mythology, is considered by elves as one of the greatest heroes of all history. After Ellisia's death, his body, still possessing magical powers, and a number of magical artifacts were sealed in a large mausoleum made of orichalcum to prevent their misuse.
- Mortimer Reed, a mid-level Johnson who operates out of the Big Rhino in the Penumbra District.
- Vigore & Jarl offer mid-level runs and specialize in acquisitions. They operate from the Wanderer in the Puyallup Barrens, and are secretly in league with Thon. While posing and operating as Mr. Johnsons, they are covertly keeping track of Joshua's activities.

== Reception ==
Reception

Aggregate score
Aggregator	Score
GameRankings	76%

Review scores
Publication	Score
Electronic Gaming Monthly	40 / 50
GamePro	13 / 20

GamePro criticized the game's "small and muddled" graphics, "tinny" sounds, tedious and awkward control system, and repetitive gameplay. However, they remarked that the game would appeal to fans of traditional RPG gameplay while offering a change of setting from the RPG stereotype of medieval fantasy. Electronic Gaming Monthly described the game as "engrossing, with excellent overhead action sequences, and plenty of areas to explore", and five reviewers scored it 40 out of 50 (average 8 out of 10). In 2017, Gamesradar ranked Shadowrun 37th on their: "Best Sega Genesis/Mega Drive games of all time."

== Legacy ==
In 2012, Harebrained Schemes announced that they would be producing a new Shadowrun title, Shadowrun Returns, to be funded through Kickstarter. As a result of the Kickstarter appeal reaching a 1.5 million dollar target, creator Jordan Weisman announced that the game would now feature an additional storyline tying in the new game with both the Sega Genesis and the Super NES versions of the game. This extra content was initially available only to backers, with general availability some time after release.
