= Shadowrun (1996 video game) =

1996 video game

- Cover art
- Developers: Compile; Group SNE
- Publisher: Compile
- Series: Shadowrun
- Platform: Mega-CD
- Release: JP: February 23, 1996
- Genres: Role-playing, visual novel
- Mode: Single-player

Shadowrun (シャドウラン, Shadouran) is a cyberpunk visual novel role-playing video game for the Sega Mega-CD adapted from the Japanese version of the pen and paper RPG Shadowrun by FASA (which was created by Group SNE). It was developed by Japanese company Compile and released on February 23, 1996 in Japan.

The game has a 1990s manga-based visual style loosely based on a contemporary Japanese manga series which was based on the Shadowrun franchise. Unlike the other Shadowrun video games which are set in Seattle and surrounding areas, this game is set entirely in Japan.

== Gameplay ==
The combat system is turn-based, and six-sided dice appear rolling on the screen determine the results of combat—the conflict resolution system used in the Shadowrun table-top game. Its gameplay has aspects of visual novels and RPGs.

== Fan translations ==
English fan translations were released in September 2026, but there are controversies regarding the use of AI to assist in translation.

== Reception ==
The game was scored a 24/40 by Famitsu. Sega Saturn Magazine gave the game a score of 73. Saturn Fan gave it a score of 72.
