= Jon Everist =

American video game composer

- Born: Seattle, Washington, U.S.
- Genres: Film score, classical, electronic
- Occupation: Composer
- Years active: 2013–present
- Website: everistsound.com

Jon Everist is an American video game composer. He is responsible for the score to BattleTech, which he received an American Society of Composers, Authors and Publishers "Composer's Choice Award" for "Best Video Game Score of 2018" and won honors at the 2019 Jerry Goldsmith Awards for Best Video Game Score. His score for Shadowrun: Hong Kong received favorable reviews. He is mostly known for his work with Seattle developer Harebrained Schemes and for hybrid scores that utilize live orchestra and a variety of synthesizers.

== Biography ==
Everist began his musical pursuits in his middle school band, played the drums. After being exposed to groups like Radiohead, Aphex Twin, MF Doom, and Aesop Rock, Soon after Everist's interests steered toward playing and experimenting with analog synths and samplers – producing music on an Ensoniq ASR-10 sampler, recording everything into Sony Acid.

After High School, being told there was no money or stability in music, Everist pursued studies in economics at the University of Washington and sold copiers during the day and made music at night and some small tours, keeping his music and professional work life separate. After hearing Amon Tobin's score for Chaos Theory and Disasterpeace's score for FEZ in 2012, Everist left his job. Cashing out his retirement he enrolled at DigiPen Institute of Technology to study music and sound for video games at age of 28.

While enrolled at DigiPen Institute of Technology, Everist had done music for several student games that Jenn Tran, Director and Cinematographer, who was a concept artist for Harebrained Schemes at the time. The creative relationship blossomed helping Everist secure the opportunity to score a trailer for Shadowrun: Returns with Harebrained Schemes, leading towards opening the door for Everist to work on Golem Arcana, Shadowrun: Dragonfall, and other releases from the company propelling him into the industry.

In an in-depth interview with VGMOnline, Everist would talk more on his road from corporate work into composing. Talking of his early work for Shadowrun: Dragonfall and the different approach he took from the existing music that had existed for the franchise, filling in the emotional gaps that had been missing from the largely dystopian cyberpunk sound palette, as well as adding his own expertise in music production.

Everist's score to 2018's BattleTech would prove a monument to his orchestral and synth fusion sound. Pitched as a "Game of Thrones in Space", Everist would use his skills as a synth musician and producer and marry it to material he wrote for the enlisted European orchestras and ensembles that would help bring to score to completion.

In 2020 Everist's score accompanying V1 Interactive's Disintegration, was released. The score was recorded with the Budapest Scoring Orchestra, with Brendon Williams helping with orchestration duties. In a radio conversation with Kate Remington of NPR (WSHU), Everist would tell his inspiration for the score and Main Theme, coming from the idea of the "fragility of humankind against all odds." Telling The Sound Architect's, Sam Hughes "I wanted to capture both the fragility and hopefulness of the human spirit...The solo piano motif propels the piece to a crescendo with the rest of the orchestra where our heroic theme is revealed, representing the power and ingenuity of humanity coming together for a common good. This is the theme of the resistance."

From a press release with Gamasutra, Disintegration's Audio Lead at V1 Interactive, Jack Menhorn, describes the creative process and collaboration with Everist: "When we started working with Jon, the main theme was the first piece we tackled as it would set the tone and character of the rest of Disintegration's music. There was so much to get right with this piece: the 'earworm' melody that people would remember, the struggle and eventual heroic victory of our characters, as well as the general vibe of the game we were still figuring out ourselves. Jon has nailed each of these criteria masterfully and went on to do the same with all of the music in the game.

Everist would also score a commercial highlight spot for Nokia's virtual reality camera, OZO.

He co-composed the score for the 2024 video game Star Wars Outlaws.

== Works ==
Games, Composer
Year	Work	Developer
2024	Star Wars Outlaws	Massive Entertainment, Ubisoft
2023	The Lamplighters League	Harebrained Schemes
2021–present	Overwatch 2 (contributing composer)	Blizzard Entertainment
2021	PUBG (contributing composer)	Tencent
2020	The Solitaire Conspiracy	Mike Bithell Games Limited
2020	Disintegration	V1 Interactive, Inc.
2019	American Fugitive (contributing composer)	Curve Digital
2019	BattleTech: Urban Warfare	Harebrained Schemes
2018	BattleTech	Harebrained Schemes
2017	Planetstorm: Fallen Horizon	Aykiro s.r.o.
2016	Necropolis	Harebrained Schemes
2015	Shadowrun: Hong Kong	Harebrained Schemes
2014	Shadowrun: Dragonfall	Harebrained Schemes
2013	Golem Arcana	Harebrained Schemes

Games, Audio
Year	Work	Developer
2019	Mortal Kombat 11 (additional sound design)	NetherRealm Studios
2016	Necropolis (Audio Director)	Harebrained Schemes
2015	Shadowrun: Hong Kong (Sound Designer)	Harebrained Schemes

Films and Television, Composer
Year	Work	Studio/Director
2021	And Then (short film)	dir. Jenn Tran
2017	Nokia OZO, Product highlight spot, composer	Nokia

Awards and Nominations
Award	Category	Result
2021 Hollywood Music in Media Awards	Best Light Score for Mobile Game	Nominated
2020 Game Audio Network Guild	Best Audio for a Mobile Game	Won
2019 Jerry Goldsmith Award	Videogame	Honors
2019 ASCAP Composer's Choice	Game Score of the Year	Nominated
2015 Video Game Music Online Score of the Year	Traditional/Acoustic	Nominated
