= Disintegration (video game) =

- Developer: V1 Interactive
- Publisher: Private Division
- Director: Marcus Lehto
- Composer: Jon Everist
- Engine: Unreal Engine 4
- Platforms: Microsoft Windows; PlayStation 4 Xbox One
- Release: WW: June 16, 2020
- Genres: First-person shooter, real-time strategy
- Modes: Single-player, multiplayer

Disintegration is a first-person shooter developed by V1 Interactive and published by Private Division. The game also features elements from the real-time strategy genre. It was released in June 2020 for Microsoft Windows, PlayStation 4 and Xbox One. It was also the only game released by V1 Interactive before their shutdown in March 2021.

== Gameplay ==
The game was played from a first-person perspective. The player assumes control of Romer Shoal, a Gravcycle pilot. The Gravcycle could hover above the ground and from this position, Romer could issue commands to his four-person squad and activate their abilities while providing aerial support. The Gravcycle in the game has three distinct models, with each granting players different advantages. For instance, Heavy can launch strong attacks but it moves at a slower pace. Romer can use his Gravcycle to highlight different areas of interest and resources, which can be salvaged to upgrade the Gravcycle, the ground units, and his own upgrade chip.

The game's multiplayer modes can support up to 10 players. In multiplayer, the player can choose to command a crew, which consists of a gravcycle and several ground units. At launch, players can choose from nine crews. Each crew has their own gameplay characteristics and unique abilities.

== Story ==
The game takes place in the late 2100s. Following a complete collapse of society due to climate change, a group of scientists develops a technique to transfer the human brain into a robotic body in order to reduce the demands placed on Earth's resources, which comes to be known as "integration". While integration is only temporary in nature, a militant group named Rayonne emerged to become a superpower and began forcing all humans to conform to the integration process. The game follows a group of outlaws, led by Romer Shoal, who had already "integrated", as they rebel against Rayonne and attempt to "reboot humanity".

== Development ==
The game was directed by Marcus Lehto, the co-creator of the Halo series. It was the debut title for his studio, V1 Interactive, which employed 30 employees. While Lehto first began brainstorming ideas for the game in 2014, the actual development took around three and a half years. Initially, the team envisioned the game as a real-time strategy (RTS) title, though he felt that the gameplay was not unique enough. Therefore, Lehto decided to incorporate elements of first-person shooter into the game by converting the RTS camera into an active participant in combat. Myth was one of the games that inspired Lehto when he was designing the gameplay. The game's musical score was composed by Jon Everist, who previously worked on Battletech. Talking about the process, Everist worked closely with the lead audio director and ensured that his music blended well with the gameplay and cinematics, owing to relying on character themes and suites as a basis for the score.

Private Division announced that it would publish the game in December 2017. It was officially announced in July 2019. A multiplayer beta was released in January 2020, lasting for two days. The game was released for Microsoft Windows, PlayStation 4 and Xbox One on June 16, 2020. The game's multiplayer support was completely removed on November 17, 2020, less than six months after the game's initial release. According to V1 Interactive, "the game unfortunately struggled to build a significant audience necessary for a compelling multiplayer experience". V1 Interactive announced on March 8, 2021, that it would be closing.

== Reception ==
Reception

Aggregate score
Aggregator	Score
Metacritic	PC: 62/100; PS4: 60/100; XONE: 67/100

Review scores
Publication	Score
Destructoid	6.5/10
Game Informer	6/10
GamesRadar+	2/5
IGN	6/10
Push Square	5/10
Shacknews	4/10
USgamer	2.5/5

Disintegration received "mixed or average reviews" according to review aggregator Metacritic.
