= Strikefleet Omega =

2012 video game

- Developer: Harebrained Schemes
- Publisher: 6waves
- Platforms: Android, iOS, Fire OS
- Release: Android, iOS: WW: 21 June 2012; Fire OS: WW: 6 July 2012
- Genres: Tower defense, real-time strategy

Strikefleet Omega is a hybrid tower defense and real-time strategy video game for iOS, Android, and Fire OS. The player is put in control a small fleet of human ships, the titular Strikefleet Omega, in a series of battles against a race of aliens that have destroyed the Earth. The player must defend their large, immobile ships by dispatching groups of smaller space fighters to fend off alien ships approaching from all directions. In later stages of the game, additional types of fighter and additional weapons become available.

Developed by Harebrained Schemes and published by 6waves, Strikefleet Omega was released for iOS and Android on 21 June 2012 and for Fire OS on 6 July 2012. It received mostly positive reviews. Reviewers praised the gameplay and control scheme, but were harshly critical of the in-game purchase system.

== Gameplay ==
Strikefleet Omega is a mobile game that combines elements from the tower defense and real-time strategy genres. In the game, the player assumes control over a collection of ships, the titular Strikefleet Omega, on a mission to kill the queen of an alien race that has already destroyed the Earth and the other Strikefleets.

The game takes place over a series of battles, each set in different a star system that is successively closer to the alien queen. In each battle the player must destroy a set number of alien vessels while protecting Strikefleet Omega's capital ship, the E.E.F. Retribution. To do this, the player swipes across the screen in the direction of the alien vessels that they want to engage, which dispatches fighter craft from the E.E.F. Retribution. The fighter craft are not directly controlled by the player, but rather follow the line drawn by the player and automatically engage enemies along that path. As the game progresses, the player will unlock additional types of deployable craft, which are used to counter new types of alien vessel. The player will also be able to launch artillery shells from the artillery ships, which reach their destination after a brief delay. In later stages the player will also be able to deploy mining craft, which gather resources that the player can then use to warp in additional capital ships that carry additional fighter craft or artillery. Selecting which ships to deploy and when to deploy them is the key to successfully completing each level.

At the end of each level, the player's performance is assessed, and the player is given between one and three stars. A higher rating leads to greater rewards, in the form of experience points, which allow the player to level up ships, and in alloy, an in-game currency that players use to purchase new ships. A second, premium currency is also used in the game. Called Megacreds, the premium currency can be used to purchase ships and one-time use boosts called Perks, and can also be used to purchase a screen-clearing attack called the Death Blossom. The most powerful ships require Megacreds to purchase, and the most powerful upgrades to the other ships also require Megacreds. While they are primarily designed as an in-app purchase currency, players can acquire a small amount of Megacreds without purchase, by destroying a rare, special ship, called a saucer.

In addition to the regular campaign, a survival mode is unlocked after completing the 10th mission of the campaign. The survival mode throws endless waves of enemies at the player, which become more difficult to defeat over time. There is a leaderboard for the endless mode, and the in-app purchases made in the campaign mode can also be used in the survival mode.

== Development ==
Strikefleet Omega was developed by Harebrained Schemes, a studio led by veteran game designer Jordan Weisman. The studio released Strikefleet at the same time that they were working on the Kickstarter-funded game Shadowrun Returns. Strikefleet was the studio's second game, after Crimson: Steam Pirates. The game was published by 6waves, and was released for iOS and Android on 21 June 2012. On 6 July 2012, Harebrained Schemes announced on their blog that the game had also been released for Amazon's Fire OS. In the same post, they also revealed that they had reached 600,000 users.

== Reception ==
Strikefleet Omega was generally well received by reviewers. The iOS version of the game holds a score of 82/100 on the review aggregator website Metacritic, based on six reviews. The highest score included was a 90, with the other scores being an 85 and four 80s. The game was included in Google Play's "Best Games of 2012" list.

Critics praised Strikefleet Omega's gameplay. Eric Ford of TouchArcade praised the fusion of tower defense and real-time strategy elements, saying that the game was well balanced and the gameplay well implemented. 148Apps.com's Jason Wadsworth praised the game's "simple, intuitive controls", and was also pleased with the game's visuals, which he found made it easy to follow the game's action even on a small screen. Gamezebo was also pleased with the game's visuals, with Nick Tylwalk saying that "graphically, Strikefleet Omega won't knock your socks off, but the artwork is solid, and it's obvious some care went into the ship design.".

One area where reviewers were unsatisfied was with the implementation of the monetization system. TouchArcade's Ford pointed out that while the game was beatable without in-app purchases, and it was possible to grind for Megacreds, much of the game's most interesting content was effectively locked behind a paywall. Modojo's review called a US$4.99 ship available for purchase "something of an "I win" button", and noted that players that spent money on in-app purchases would place much better on the survival mode leaderboard. Pocket Gamer, on the other hand, found the in-app purchase system decently balanced, and while Gamezebo also found the purchases unobjectionable, it did take issue with the intrusiveness of the advertisements shown between missions and while the game is loading.
