= Moai (software) =

Free game development engine

- Developer: Zipline Games
- Written in: Lua, C++
- Type: Game engine, Cloud computing
- License: Common Public Attribution License, Proprietary
- Website: getmoai.com (down since 2018)
- Repository: github.com/moai/moai-dev

Moai is a development and deployment platform designed for the creation of mobile games on iOS and Android smartphones. The Moai platform consists of Moai SDK, an open source game engine, and Moai Cloud, a cloud platform as a service (PaaS) for the hosting and deployment of game services. Moai developers use Lua, C++ and OpenGL, to build mobile games that span smartphones and cloud. Several commercial games have been built with Moai, including Crimson: Steam Pirates, Invisible, Inc., and Broken Age. Moai integrates third-party game analytics and monetization services such as Apsalar and Tapjoy.

== History ==
A public beta of Moai was launched in July 2011. The first Moai game to ship was Crimson: Steam Pirates, developed by Jordan Weisman and published by Bungie Aerospace in September 2011. The 1.0 release of Moai was announced in March 2012. As of 2017, the platform is no longer supported.

== Notable games ==
Year	Title	Developer	Ref.
2011	Crimson: Steam Pirates	Harebrained Schemes	
2011	Wolf Toss	Zipline Games	
2014-2015	Broken Age	Double Fine	
2014	Spacebase DF-9	Double Fine	
2015	Invisible, Inc.	Klei Entertainment	
2017	The Franz Kafka Videogame	Denis Galanin	
2021	Eastward	Pixpil	
