= The Lamplighters League =

- Developer: Harebrained Schemes
- Publisher: Paradox Interactive
- Director: Christopher Rogers
- Composer: Jon Everist
- Engine: Unity
- Platforms: Microsoft Windows; Xbox Series X/S
- Release: October 3, 2023
- Genre: Turn-based tactics
- Mode: Single-player

The Lamplighters League (Note: Also titled as The Lamplighters League and the Tower at the End of the World) is a turn-based tactics video game developed by Harebrained Schemes and published by Paradox Interactive. The game was released for Windows, Xbox One and Xbox Series X/S in October 2023. It received mixed reviews from critics and was not a commercial success.

== Story ==
Set in an alternate version of the 1930s, the player must assemble a team of misfits to stop an ancient cult named the Banished Court, which aims to achieve world domination.

== Gameplay ==
While players only have access to three agents at the beginning of the game, the game will feature 10 characters at launch. Different characters have different weapons and abilities. For instance, Ana Sofia can heal her allies, while Celestine can hypnotize enemies. Other skills and perks can also be unlocked at the player's headquarters in the form of equippable cards. While these cards can improve the player's combat efficiency, they may also hinder them by introducing negative traits. Characters may be stressed when they went on multiple consecutive missions. Their combat performance would be significantly impaired. Players are advised to regularly rotate their agents, allowing some to rest and rejuvenate at the league's headquarters.

In each mission, players can first freely explore the level in real time. In this infiltration phase, players can collect items and eliminate enemies undetected. This also allows players to place traps and place their agents in the perfect position before engaging enemies in combat. Combat in the game is turn-based, similar to games such as XCOM and Gears Tactics. Once the player defeats all enemies in an area, they will return to infiltration mode and continue to progress. While the map of each mission is handcrafted by the team, enemies and interactables are procedurally generated.

The game also features a world map. Members of the Lamplighters League must try to disrupt the progress of the game's three hostile factions as they wreak havoc around the world. Agents resting in the base can also be sent on side expeditions.

== Development ==
The Lamplighters League was developed by Harebrained Schemes, the developer behind the Shadowrun trilogy and the BattleTech video games. The game was heavily inspired by pulp magazines published in the 1930s. Announced in March 2023, the game was released for Windows, Xbox One and Xbox Series X/S on October 3, 2023.

== Reception ==
The Lamplighters League received mixed reviews for Windows and Xbox Series X according to review aggregator website Metacritic.

=== Sales ===
In October 2023, Paradox Interactive announced that The Lamplighters League's "commercial reception has been too weak, which is frankly a big disappointment", that lower-than-expected sales meant it was writing off the game’s development costs, and that it expected the move to result in a $22.7 million reduction in pre-tax profit for the fourth quarter. They also confirmed reports that significant layoffs had taken place at Harebrained Schemes, prior to the completion of the game.

== See also ==
- List of turn-based tactics video games
- List of Paradox Interactive games
