= Greg Miller (host) =

American media personality

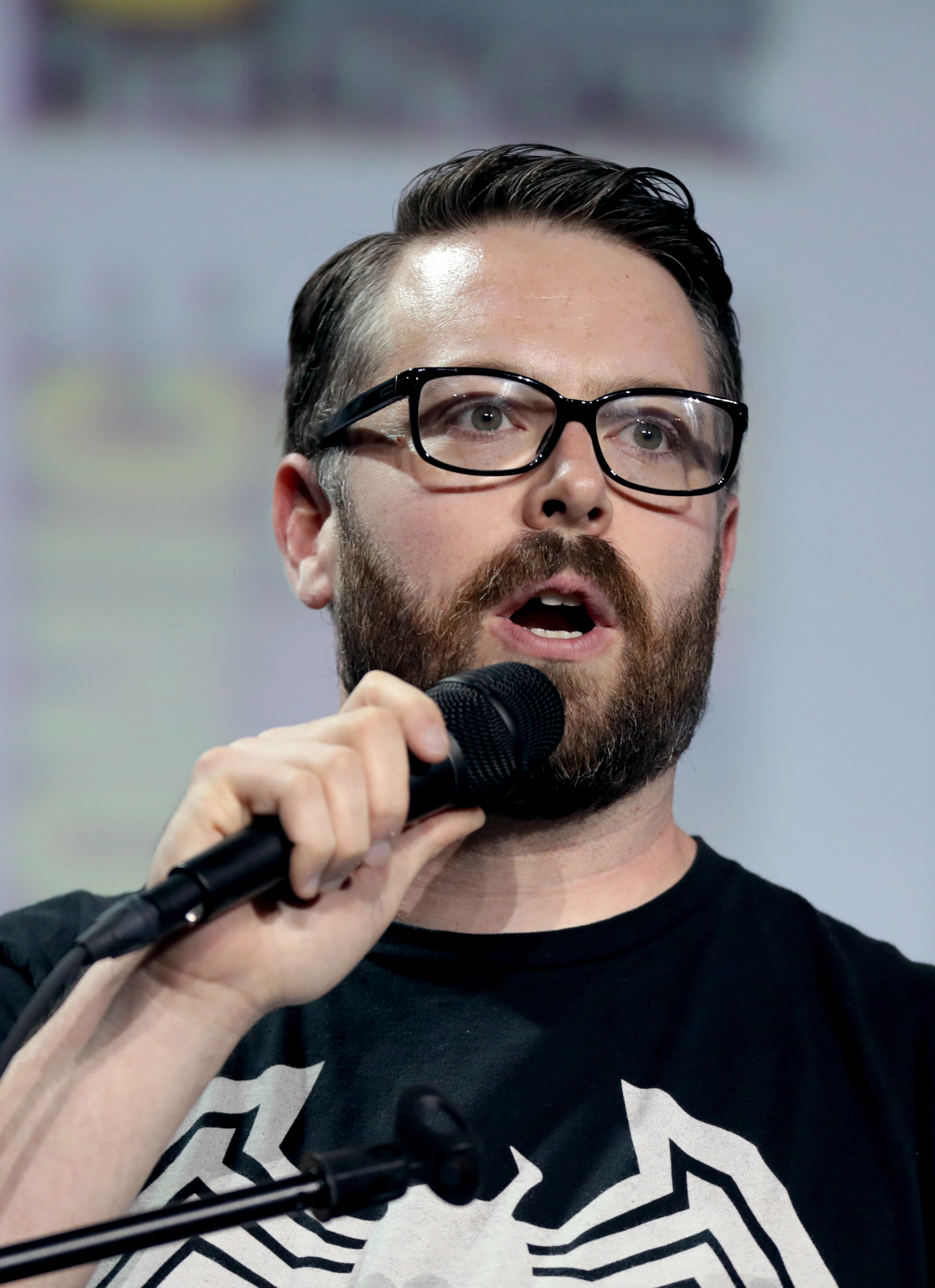
- Miller in 2019
- Born: Gregory James Miller; April 27, 1983 (age 43); Glen Ellyn, Illinois, U.S.
- Occupations: Media personality, host
- Years active: 2007–present
- Spouse: Geneviève St-Onge (m. 2017)
- Children: 1

Gregory James Miller (born April 27, 1983) is an American media personality who came to prominence as a former editor and video host for the entertainment website IGN. He is the co-founder and CEO of the entertainment company Kinda Funny, and was formerly employed by WWE as a host from 2022 to 2025.

== Early life ==
Miller was born in Glen Ellyn, Illinois, on April 27, 1983. Growing up, he was very interested in video games and dreamed of writing for Electronic Gaming Monthly or GamePro. He was the editor-in-chief of both of his high school's newspapers. In 2005, he graduated from the University of Missouri in Columbia, Missouri, where he earned a degree in journalism and wrote for the Columbia Missourian, becoming the editor-in-chief Tom Warhover's go-to writer for video game content.

== Career ==
Miller started his career at the Columbia Tribune in 2005, after he was unable to find a job writing about video games. There, he was a general assignment reporter working the weekend nightshift and covering everything from politics to sports to tragedies. In 2006, he convinced the paper to give him his own column called Game Over to write about video games in addition to the difficult subject matter of his general assignments.

Miller joined IGN in 2007. Miller was a frequent cast member and host on the IGN audio-video podcasts Game Scoop! and Podcast Beyond. Miller gained popularity with IGN fans hosting a video show called Up At Noon.

Miller started his YouTube channel GameOverGreggy in 2012, and he and IGN co-worker Colin Moriarty were allowed to produce content as long as it wasn't about video games. In 2013, they rebranded the channel to Kinda Funny, and produced a weekly show called GameOverGreggy, alongside fellow IGN colleagues Nick Scarpino and Tim Gettys. In 2014, they started a Patreon to fund their side project. Miller and his castmates left IGN on January 5, 2015, to found a company named after their YouTube channel.

In 2017 and 2018, Miller hosted the D.I.C.E. Awards alongside Jessica Chobot. In 2021, he hosted E3 alongside Jacki Jing and Alex "Goldenboy" Mendez.

=== Video game appearances ===
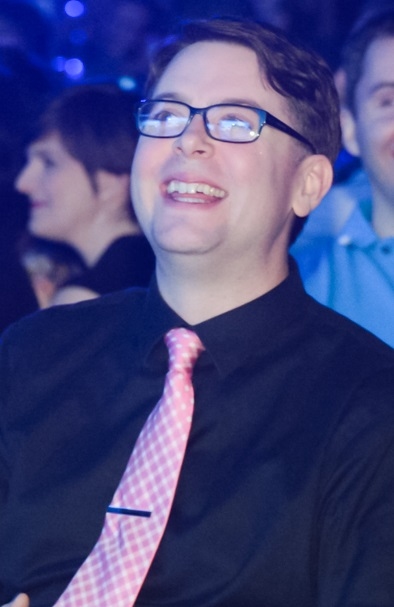
Miller in 2015

In 2016, Miller provided the voice of Superboy in DC Universe Online. Miller's affinity for Spider-Man was memorialized in an Easter egg in the video game Spider-Man as Shirtless Spider-Man. Miller has been a voice actor in numerous other video game titles, including LEGO Marvel Super Heroes 2 as Howard the Duck, Lego DC Super-Villains as Polka-Dot Man, Lego Marvel's Avengers as Aldrich Killian, and Oddworld: Soulstorm. In 2020 he appeared in The Solitaire Conspiracy, a video game by Mike Bithell. Miller appears in full motion video sequences playing Jim Ratio, who serves as the player's handler throughout the campaign.

=== Other work ===
In 2020, Miller was invited to co-author the story Kill the Batman from The Joker 80th Anniversary 100-Page Super Spectacular #1 alongside Rogue One writer Gary Whitta.

Miller was one of five co-owners of the FCF Wild Aces indoor football team.

== Awards ==
Miller was named "Trending Gamer" at the 2015 The Game Awards and "Most Entertaining Online Personality" at the 2016 SXSW Gaming Awards. He was nominated for a Streamy Award in 2014 for Rooster Teeth's The Gauntlet in the category of best collaboration.

== Personal life ==
Miller married his first wife while in college, but the couple divorced in 2008. He married his second wife, French Canadian video game shipment company co-founder Geneviève St-Onge, in May 2017. They have one child together.

Miller was diagnosed with Hodgkin lymphoma in August 2012. His cancer has remained in remission since chemotherapy, but he has said that his personality changed due to the experience.
