= Thomas Was Alone =

2012 video game

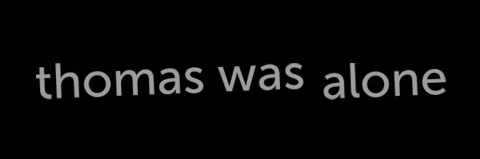
- Developer: Mike Bithell
- Publisher: Mike Bithell (Note: Curve Digital published ports for PlayStation, Xbox, and Wii U versions, Bossa Studios published the mobile ports, and Ant Workshop published the Nintendo Switch port)
- Engine: Unity
- Platforms: Windows, OS X, PlayStation 3, PlayStation Vita, Linux, iOS, Android, Xbox One, PlayStation 4, Wii U, Nintendo Switch
- Release: Windows, OS X: WW: 30 June 2012; PlayStation 3, PlayStation Vita: NA: 23 April 2013; EU: 24 April 2013; Linux: WW: 28 May 2013; iOS: WW: 15 May 2014; Android: WW: 24 July 2014; Xbox One: WW: 21 November 2014; PlayStation 4, Wii U: NA: 25 November 2014; EU: 26 November 2014; Nintendo Switch: WW: 19 February 2021
- Genre: Puzzle-platform
- Mode: Single-player

Thomas Was Alone is a 2012 puzzle-platform game created by Mike Bithell, originally released as a Flash-based browser game in October 2010. The game was expanded and released for Microsoft Windows and OS X in June 2012. It has subsequently been released for Linux, PlayStation 3, PlayStation 4, PlayStation Vita, Xbox One, Wii U, iOS, Android and Nintendo Switch. In the game, the player controls one or more simple rectangles representing several out-of-control artificial intelligence entities, working with the shapes to get each to their individual end points on each level. Each shape is characterized by a unique name and personality, including the eponymous Thomas, which is conveyed to the player through the use of a narrator voiced by Danny Wallace, whose performance earned the game a BAFTA Games Award.

== Gameplay ==
In Thomas Was Alone, the player manipulates several rectangular shapes across a platforming environment, using their unique abilities, such as floating in water, to aid the other shapes.

Thomas Was Alone takes place within a computer mainframe, where some unspecified "Event" has caused several artificial intelligence routines to run out of control and gain personality. Each entity is represented by a simple coloured shape; the game's eponymous character is a simple red rectangle. Each shape has unique abilities; while all shapes can move left or right across platforms and perform jumps, the height of these jumps may be limited by the shape, or they may have other abilities, such as being able to float on water. When the player has access to two or more of these shapes, they can freely switch between them, controlling one shape at a time.

Though the shapes themselves cannot be heard, the narrator describes the personalities and thoughts of each shape as the game progresses.

The goal in each level within the game is to direct the shapes to exit points specifically tied to each shape, so that they all simultaneously occupy this exit. This most often requires using the shape abilities together to maneuver them appropriately. A shape that cannot jump very high can be helped by creating a staircase from other shapes so that the shape can reach a higher platform, or the shape that can float can ferry the other shapes across water. A shape can be lost to several hazards, but it will reappear at the start of the level, or at a checkpoint if the shape has passed such a point.

There are ten sets of levels, usually introducing a new character, with ten levels within each set.

== Plot ==
A company called Artificial Life Solutions experiments with various artificial intelligence solutions, but something unexplained causes some AIs to become self-aware. These AIs perceive their digital world as a 2D space with themselves represented as quadrilateral shapes.

One of them is called "Thomas-AT-23-6-12", or simply Thomas, represented as a red rectangle. Thomas is curious and observant by nature. He starts to travel through his internal world, trying to find out his own purpose and perhaps companionship. He meets other AIs, each with different personalities and abilities: the cynical Chris, the show-off John, the self-proclaimed superhero Claire, and the apprehensive Laura. Laura is uncomfortable joining the crew, concerned about the black "pixel cloud" that has been following her. The pixel cloud soon attacks and "eats" each of the five AIs.

The pixel cloud is revealed to be a "splitter", a mechanism that attempts to fix the fact that multiple AIs are erroneously being placed in the same virtual space. James, an AI who falls upwards instead of down, frees Thomas from the splitter's virtual prison. They meet Sarah, a purple AI, who tells them about "the fountain of wisdom", the system's Internet uplink. When they reach it, only Thomas is able to access it. Thomas connects to the Internet for twelve seconds, creating a "network connection spike" which humans later misidentify as the moment Thomas became self-aware. He learns of the outside world, then rescues his other four friends and tells them of what he learned. He plans to become an "architect", someone who is able to modify his world and empower other AIs to do the same. Thomas and all his friends enter the "creation matrix", the generator of the world, and disappear.

Some time later, other AIs, all in different shades of grey, emerge and start using "shifters", coloured patches that equip them with one of the skills of the original seven architects. These new characters include Grey, Sam, Jo, Paul, and a team of five small, identical AIs collectively called Team Jump. Together, these disparate AIs all seek the final portal that leads them to the outer world. Paul realizes that Grey has lied to them and will abandon them when given the chance, and when he can't warn Sam and Jo about the danger, he lures Grey to a place where Grey is eaten by the final splitter. Although Paul and Team Jump are somehow left behind along the way, Sam and Jo find and leap into the final portal and enter the outer world. The final scene shows three monitors on a wall in the real world, inside the Artificial Life Solutions facility. Red emergency lights flash and the screens display pure white as Sam and Jo become the first truly free AIs.

Later, many other AIs – enabled by the efforts of Thomas and his friends – escape the mainframe and begin to coexist with humans in the real world. The event is referred to as the "emergence". Thomas, Chris, John, Claire, and Laura (and to a lesser extent, James and Sarah) are immortalized in history as the original architects who allowed this to happen.

The "Benjamin's Flight" expansion later reveals that Thomas and his friends were not the first AIs to attempt to reach "emergence". It is discovered that jetpack-wielding AI Benjamin had attempted to reach the "fountain of wisdom" before, with AIs Sarah and Anna. Benjamin however was not ready for the "fountain" and became blinded and lost in the system after contact with it. Following this Sarah pledged to find the fountain again, leading to her encounters with Thomas and his friends.

== Development ==
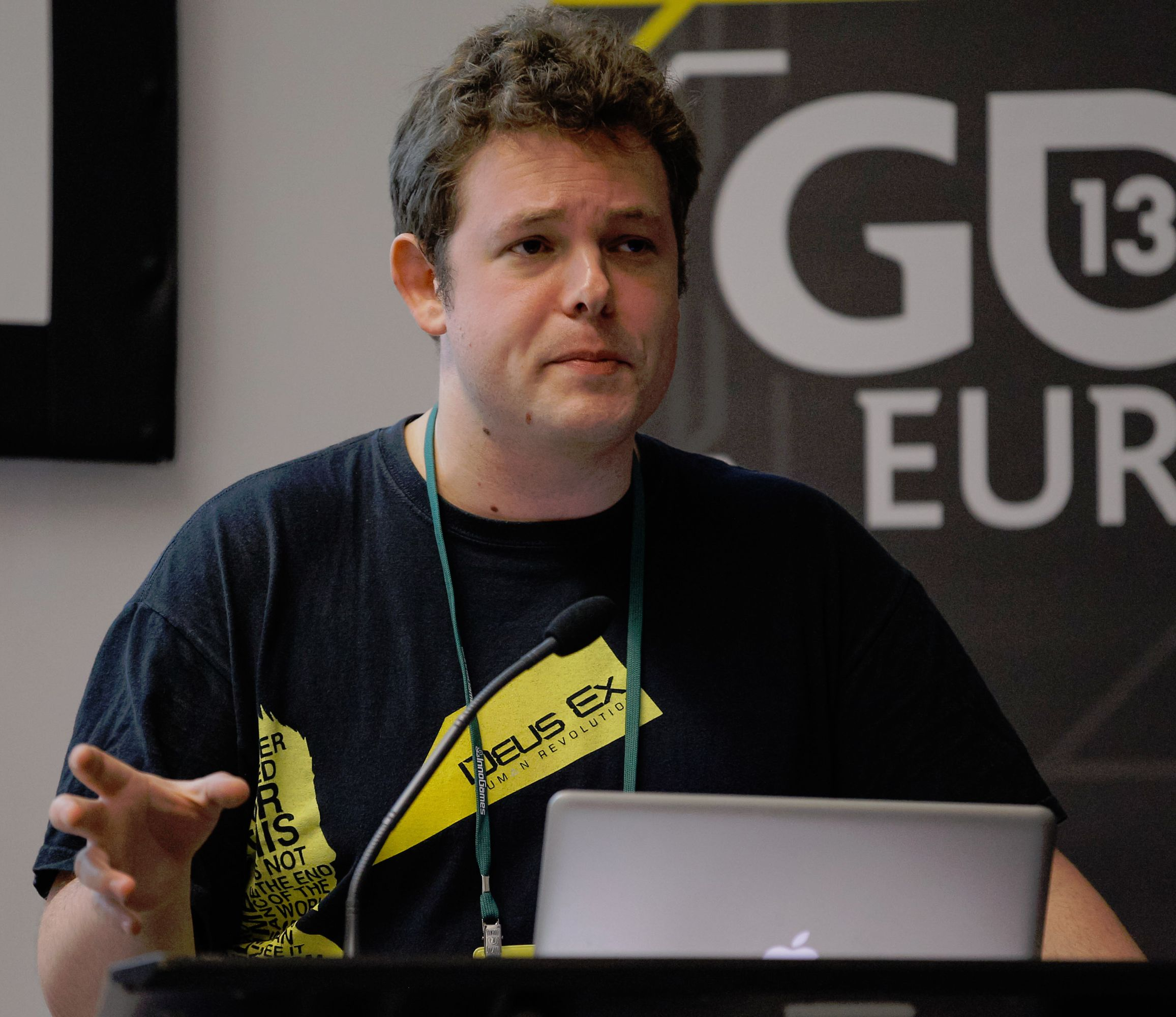
Mike Bithell at the 2013 Game Developers Conference Europe

Thomas Was Alone was developed by Mike Bithell. The initial concept of the game was created during a personal 24-hour game jam while Bithell was working at Blitz Games in October 2010. Bithell based the game on the concept of friendship, and came upon the mechanics of using multiple blocks with different abilities as a means of representing this. He was also inspired by the idea of people chained together and forced to work as one to escape as highlighted in the film O Brother, Where Art Thou?, and the idea of modernism and minimalism exemplified by the Bauhaus school. The initial game was a Flash-based browser game released to the Kongregate site on 17 October 2010, though since has been removed in favor of the more expansive effort. Bithell had planned to expand the game to include a story and additional platforming elements like buttons and platforms, as well as to fix issues he felt were wrong with the game's controls.

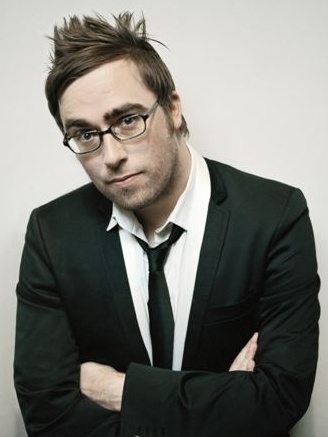
Humorist Danny Wallace provides the voice of the Narrator in the game, which earned him a BAFTA Performance award.

Bithell started to work on a more complete version of Thomas Was Alone in early 2011, considering this a means to teach himself how to work with the Unity game engine. During this time, he became lead game designer at Bossa Studios in London, where development of Thomas Was Alone was done on Bithell's off-hours with Bossa's blessing. Bithell continued to use rectangular characters, in part due to the inspiration of Piet Mondrian's minimalist works, and to keep the stacking mechanic relatively simple. He developed other areas of the game to contrast the "sterile" feel of the rectangular characters. Considering the story and gameplay design aesthetics used by Valve in their games, Bithell wrote a script to give each of the rectangles a personality and add some humor inspired by Douglas Adams and Danny Wallace. Wallace himself is the game's narrator, a result of Bithell requesting the humorist's participation in the project after struggling to find equivalent voice actors. Bithell estimates that it cost him £5,000 for all of the game's development and legal costs (excluding his own wage), and had raised another £2,000 through an Indiegogo fundraising campaign to get Wallace's voice work. At the time of release, Bithell had help in spreading the word by other developers like Éric Chahi, and a humorous April Fools video created by motion capture studio Audiomotion, claiming that Thomas's animations were created through motion capture.

For help with the soundtrack, Bithell was able to contact David Housden through a mutual friend. Housden, who had just graduated from a university and was looking to get into game audio composition, provided a demo piece which became the game's credits theme. He subsequently went on to produce the remainder of the game's soundtrack. Housden initially had trouble in considering the arrangements for the game when he envisioned the characters as simple rectangles, but when he started attaching more humanlike attributes to them, he found it was much easier to compose the music towards these feelings. Bithell had wanted the soundtrack to be procedurally generated, which Housden found to be initially difficult; the two came up with the idea of using a procedurally generated assembly of multiple instrument tracks over a fixed song line to achieve the feel that Bithell wanted. With the success of Thomas, Housden had been called on to do more work for Bossa, composed the music for Bithell's subsequent game Volume, and has been signed onto a music outsourcing agency for television and movie productions.

=== Ports ===
A port for Linux operating systems was first released as part of a Humble Bundle package in May 2013.

In February 2013, Bithell announced that Thomas would be released on the PlayStation 3 and PlayStation Vita, and it was subsequently available in April 2013; the title features cross buy, allowing the player to buy the title once for both platforms. Additional time-exclusive content with new levels and a new character named Benjamin who has jetpack-like abilities were included with this release. The Vita version supports the use of the touch screen to select the specific shapes or move the camera about. These releases were supported with work from Bossa and Curve Studios. Bithell credits Sony UK's senior business development manager Shahid Ahmad for helping to bring Thomas to the PlayStation consoles. In 2012, Ahmad was looking for content for the PlayStation Vita, and after encountering the April Fools' trailer for the game he reached out to Bithell, considering his novel use of marketing to be of interest. Bossa would continue to help develop a port of Thomas for iOS devices that was released in May 2014. Bithell was not sure of doing the iOS at first, but realized that with the game's success on the PlayStation platforms, he believed "it was connecting with people who wouldn't traditionally pick up a game on a console or [personal computer]". He was also assured that the iOS port was a proper move after making sure the game felt right on the touch-screen device and did not feel like a money grab. A port to Android devices was released in July 2014.

The additional content for the PlayStation release was made available for free for owners of the Windows, Mac OS X, and Linux versions of the game on 26 June 2014.

The game was also released on Xbox One, PlayStation 4 and Wii U in November 2014.

In September 2016, it was announced that Bithell and distributor Limited Run Games would release a physical version of Thomas Was Alone for the PlayStation 4 and Vita. The game, limited to 4,000 copies on each platform, was released exclusively on Limited Run's website as a mail-in order title.

A Nintendo Switch version of the game was released on 19 February 2021, with a free demo being released beforehand on 29 January 2021.

== Reception ==
Reception

Aggregate score
Aggregator	Score
Metacritic	(iOS) 88/100 (PS3) 80/100 (WIIU) 79/100 (VITA) 78/100 (PC) 77/100

Review scores
Publication	Score
Destructoid	9/10
Edge	7/10
GameSpot	7.5/10
IGN	8/10
Joystiq	4/5
The Daily Telegraph	4/5
TouchArcade	(iOS) 4.5/5

Award
Publication	Award
BAFTA Games Awards	Best Performer: Danny Wallace

Thomas Was Alone received positive reviews from critics, praising the use of narration to give otherwise simplistic shapes personalities, and the careful introduction and pacing of puzzles to create a smooth learning curve over the otherwise short game. Aggregating review website Metacritic calculated an average scores of 80 out of 100 for the PlayStation 3 version, 79 out of 100 for the Wii U version, 78 out of 100 for the PlayStation Vita version, and 77 out of 100 for the PC version.

The storytelling and characters were praised by reviewers specifically, with IGN stating that "it is the most endearingly characterful game about jumping rectangles that you will ever play", and Destructoid saying, "Thomas Was Alone tells a story that's more complex than games orders of magnitude more expensive and difficult to develop." Of the script, The Telegraph called it "a fascinating example of great writing". Steven O'Donnell of Good Game said "I love how such simple shapes can form such strong personalities. I found myself imagining little conversations between them as I played."

The soundtrack was also complimented by some reviewers, with The Telegraph describing it as a "wonderful, understated score". Entertainment Weekly called the score "beautiful", noting how blips of electronic music start as "staccato interruptions" in an otherwise acoustic score, but slowly grow to replace those instruments, representing how the AI characters of the game are trying to escape.

Wallace's role as Narrator won the "Performance" category at the 9th British Academy Video Games Awards, while the game itself was nominated in the "Story" category, and Housden's soundtrack for "Best Original Score". The game was an Honorable Mention in the 2013 Independent Games Festival awards in the "Audio" category.

As of April 2014, Bithell states that Thomas Was Alone has sold more than 1 million copies, not including free downloads during its appearance on the PlayStation Plus program. Bithell considered the game to be a larger success than he had anticipated, and attributes part of that to YouTube videos from players that helped to increase exposure to the game. Bithell stated that he had received criticism from some players about the simplicity of the game's concept, based on the idea of just stacking rectangles. Bithell notes that it was due to this simplicity that he was able to learn the Unity engine and be able to expand on that with future projects. With the revenue he earned from its sales, Bithell left Bossa to pursue further indie game development. Bithell claimed at the time to have no specific idea for his next game, but stated that the community of friends and developers that came from his work on Thomas would be there to help review his ideas and provide pointers for additional help. Due to the game being available as a free title in the European PlayStation Plus program, Bithell has stated that the game has gained an appreciable audience and recognition for himself, giving him some clout as he develops his second title, Volume.
