= John Wick Hex =

2019 video game

- Developer: Bithell Games
- Publishers: Good Shepherd Entertainment (2019–2024); Big Fan Games (2024–)
- Director: Mike Bithell
- Producers: Ben Andac; Amanda Kruse
- Composer: Austin Wintory
- Series: John Wick
- Platforms: macOS; Windows; PlayStation 4; Nintendo Switch; Xbox One
- Release: macOS, Windows: WW: 8 October 2019; PlayStation 4: WW: 5 May 2020; Switch, Xbox One: WW: 4 December 2020
- Genre: Tactical role-playing
- Mode: Single-player

John Wick Hex is a 2019 tactical role-playing game developed by Bithell Games and originally published by Good Shepherd Entertainment. Based on the John Wick franchise, it was released on 8 October 2019 for macOS and Windows. The PlayStation 4 port of the game released on 5 May 2020. Ports to the Nintendo Switch and Xbox One were released on 4 December 2020. The game serves as a narrative prequel to the film series.

== Gameplay ==
The player being presented with various options for controlling John Wick and what impact they will have on timing

John Wick Hex is a timeline strategy game with elements of resource management where the player maneuvers the titular character through a level on a hex-based grid, using various moves and actions to defeat enemies and avoid being hit by his foes.

To the player, the actions of John Wick and visible enemies are shown on a timeline similar to those used in video editing software, with actions taking different amounts of time. The player loads commands for John Wick to follow into this timeline, and the game will pause if the player has not added further actions into the timeline. These actions may be about gaining a better position to fire from, taking a better stance that improves John Wick's chances to hit, or to take defensive actions and improved cover from foes.

Players must also take into consideration the limited ammo that John Wick has i.e. 15 bullets in his handgun, because once the player reloads their weapon then the player loses any bullets left in the weapon's magazine. Although John Wick is able to grab weapons from enemies, this takes precious time, requiring the player to think through all the possible actions they can take before getting shot by the enemies. An interesting fact is that every time a player chooses to shoot, John Wick fires two rounds at his enemy because John Wick double-taps his enemies in the movies.

Initially the level is covered by a type of fog of war which becomes unveiled as the player moves John Wick further in the level. The game has been described as a combination of tactics games such as X-COM mixed with fast-paced decision making of Superhot. At the completion of a level, the game can play back a replay of the movements, without waiting for any user input, mimicking some of the fluidity of the action scenes from the John Wick films.

== Plot ==
Hex, an international criminal mastermind, abducts Winston and Charon of the New York Continental as an act of rebellion against the High Table and stows them away at an undisclosed location. In response, a contract is put out by the High Table to retrieve them and John Wick is dispatched to ensure that fealty is sworn. The plot follows Wick in his prime as he sets out to dismantle Hex's network of underbosses and enforcers across New York and Switzerland on his way to end Hex's reign and reassert the High Table's dominance.

== Development ==
The game John Wick Hex originated after a casual discussion between game developer Mike Bithell and his friend Ben Andac, who works with Good Shepherd Entertainment. Both had just seen an action film and the conversation turned to how one would make a video game to capture the action and fight scenes from the John Wick films. Bithell suggested the idea of a turn-based tactical game, what he called "John Wick chess", in which the player would have to make new decisions as the situation changes.

Andac was later part of discussions between Lionsgate Entertainment and Good Shepherd Entertainment; the film production company was looking for novel concepts for video games that could be used to expand upon the John Wick film series. According to Bithell, Lionsgate wanted more than just an unoriginal game as a cash grab, but something that distanced itself from what one would have expected for a John Wick-oriented game, in the same manner that Lionsgate had seen the first film as a novel twist on a typical action movie. Andac recalled Bithell's concept as well as his unique style of game production, and put Bithell's idea out there.

This subsequently led to discussions between Bithell, Lionsgate, and Good Shepherd to give Bithell the green light to start development of Hex in mid-2018. Bithell stated that he felt responsible with the licensed property, that "If you’re making a licensed game and you’re not trying to push the medium forward in my opinion you’re wasting your time."

In addition to reviewing the first two films, Bithell was given access to the script for John Wick: Chapter 3 – Parabellum prior to its production. Bithell had the opportunity to discuss the films' direction with Chad Stahelski, the series' director, during post-production editing, and also was able to work with the various stuntmen on the film to develop the animations to be used in the game. Bithell credited Stahelski with the fog of war concept to help create tensions with unknowns on each level.

Bithell wanted to capture the idea that combat in the John Wick universe is more like a conversation with back and forth responses, a factor that the stunt coordinators for the films have kept in mind. One key movie scene that inspired this approach came from the first Wick film, where Wick has run out of bullets, so he takes a moment to stun his enemy to give him time to reload his weapon and fire again before the enemy recovers; Bithell wanted the gameplay to be able to capture that type of flow. Bithell credits the film's stunt coordinator JoJo Eusebio in offering some more potential moves for John Wick that are not shown in the film but make for good strategic elements in a video game, such as John Wick using enemies as moving cover; by grabbing and then pushing a foe a short distance.

Originally, Bithell built the game out as the turn-based tactical game he had originally described, so that the player would direct John Wick during his turn, then wait for the other opponents to complete their moves. When showing this version of the game to Lionsgate executives, they were concerned that this made it appear that John Wick just stood there, taking the shots fired by his opponents. Bithell took this advice to heart and reworked the core game to use the timeline approach instead of the turn-based approach, so that John Wick's movements and enemy actions were happening simultaneously. Bithell regularly traveled to Los Angeles to keep Lionsgate abreast of the game's status and for additional feedback.

Actors Ian McShane and Lance Reddick reprise their roles from the films, while Troy Baker voices the character of Hex.

The game was first revealed in May 2019, just prior to the release of John Wick 3, with further details revealed at E3 2019. The game was released on 8 October 2019 for macOS and Windows. A PlayStation 4 port of the game was released on 5 May 2020, and for Nintendo Switch and Xbox One on 4 December 2020.

In 2025, the game's publishing rights was switched to Big Fan Games, a label of Good Shepherd Entertainment's parent company Devolver Digital focused on licensed games. Big Fan announced that John Wick Hex will be delisted as of July 17, 2025, on digital storefronts, but those that have purchased the game before that would still be able to download and play it. While Big Fan did not give any reason for delisting, Polygon and other websites speculated it involved the expiration of intellectual property rights.

== Reception ==
Reception

Aggregate score
Aggregator	Score
Metacritic	PC: 74/100; PS4: 78/100; NS: 73/100; XONE: 70/100

Review scores
Publication	Score
Destructoid	8/10
Edge	6/10
Game Informer	8/10
GameSpot	8/10
IGN	6.8/10
Jeuxvideo.com	14/20
Nintendo Life	6/10
Nintendo World Report	8/10
PlayStation Official Magazine – UK	7/10
PC Gamer (US)	80/100
PCGamesN	8/10
USgamer	2.5/5

John Wick Hex received average reviews. Aggregating review website Metacritic gave the game 74/100 based on 53 reviews.

=== Accolades ===
Year	Award	Category	Result	Ref.
2019	Game Critics Awards	Best Original Game	Nominated	
2019	Game Critics Awards	Best Strategy Game	Won	
2019	Game Critics Awards	Best Independent Game	Nominated	
2020	NAVGTR Awards	Gameplay Design, Franchise	Nominated	
2020	NAVGTR Awards	Game, Strategy	Nominated	
2020	MCV/Develop Awards	Visual Innovation of the Year	Nominated	
2020	MCV/Develop Awards	Gameplay Innovation of the Year	Nominated	
