= Subsurface Circular =

2017 video game

- Developer: Mike Bithell Games
- Publisher: Mike Bithell Games
- Composer: Dan le Sac
- Platforms: Microsoft Windows, macOS, iOS, Nintendo Switch
- Release: Microsoft Windows, macOS; 17 August 2017; iOS; 23 October 2017; Nintendo Switch; 1 March 2018
- Genre: Text adventure
- Mode: Single-player

Subsurface Circular is a text-based adventure game developed and published by Mike Bithell Games. The game was released for Microsoft Windows and macOS on 17 August 2017, iOS on 23 October 2017 and Nintendo Switch on 1 March 2018. The game received critical acclaim for its engaging narrative and writing. A sequel to the game Quarantine Circular released on May 22, 2018.

== Gameplay ==
Subsurface Circular is a loose take on text-based adventure games, with the game presented in a three-dimensional, third-person perspective. The player controls a robot detective in a futuristic setting, tasked with solving cases aboard a subway system below a human city that ferries around other robots that serve as the workforce. In the game, the robot detective must solve a case of a number of robots that have gone missing, by talking to other robots while they are on the subway cars, following various conversation trees, and at times, solving puzzles to help out a robot and get more information. The player acquires "focal points" on achieving certain goals, which then can be used to question other robots to get more information to solve the mystery.

== Plot ==
While the player can select from several names for the playable character, this summary assumes the use of "Theta One One" for purposes of clarity.

Theta One One, the playable character, is an android-like Tek, assigned as a detective for other Teks on a subway system and serving his human masters, known as "management". During one night, one Tek, a fabricator, tells Theta One One of another Tek that had gone missing, and Theta One One decides to take the case. As the subway train circles the city, Theta One One talks to other Tek passengers, learning of a mysterious Red Tek that may be connected to the mystery, that a number of other Teks may have gone missing, and that there is growing resentment to Teks by the human population in the city above. Eventually, Theta One One is able to upload the case details to management, upon which they inform the Tek that since it took the case without their instructions, the Tek will be apprehended. At the next station, two detective Teks arrive, preparing to deal with Theta One One, but the Tek is able to manipulate the pair to learn that over hundreds of Teks have gone missing over the last several months, and to management, they saw this as a rounding error in Tek production. Management did not want this known, and thus it seems to others that Teks have simply gone missing. The detective Teks use an override access code to reset Theta One One to an unassigned position and leave the Tek to get off later on the subway ride to take itself to fabrication and be reassigned.

Theta One One is still experiencing the sense of loss when at the next stop it meets an infantry Tek who seeks to confess its sins. Theta One One manages to coax this out of the Tek, and learns that it was part of the plan to overproduce infantry Teks that have been amassing outside of the city above, preparing to attack it; this is the source of management's rounding error. At the next stop, the same fabricator that Theta One One first talked to that night comes aboard, and reveals it was the Red Tek others spoke of, and is leading this plan. It planned to use the infantry Teks to kill management and have Teks take over which could run the city more efficiently; this would help the humans working low-level jobs to be able to pursue more constructive options while Teks replace their roles. Otherwise, without this change, the system will continue on the status quo, with management using Teks to replace humans, and hurting many humans in the process. Red Tek needed Theta One One to investigate as it did as to scout the current situation in the city from the Tek's perspective, providing its high-level intelligence to analyze the situation. At this point, Red Tek offers Theta One One a weapon and tells it that a choice to kill Red Tek or itself must be made; by killing Red Tek, Theta One One will be able to report to management about the infantry Teks and give them time to stop it, as to let the status quo remain; by killing itself, Theta One One would allow the Tek overthrow to proceed. The game ends after the player makes either choice.

== Development and release ==
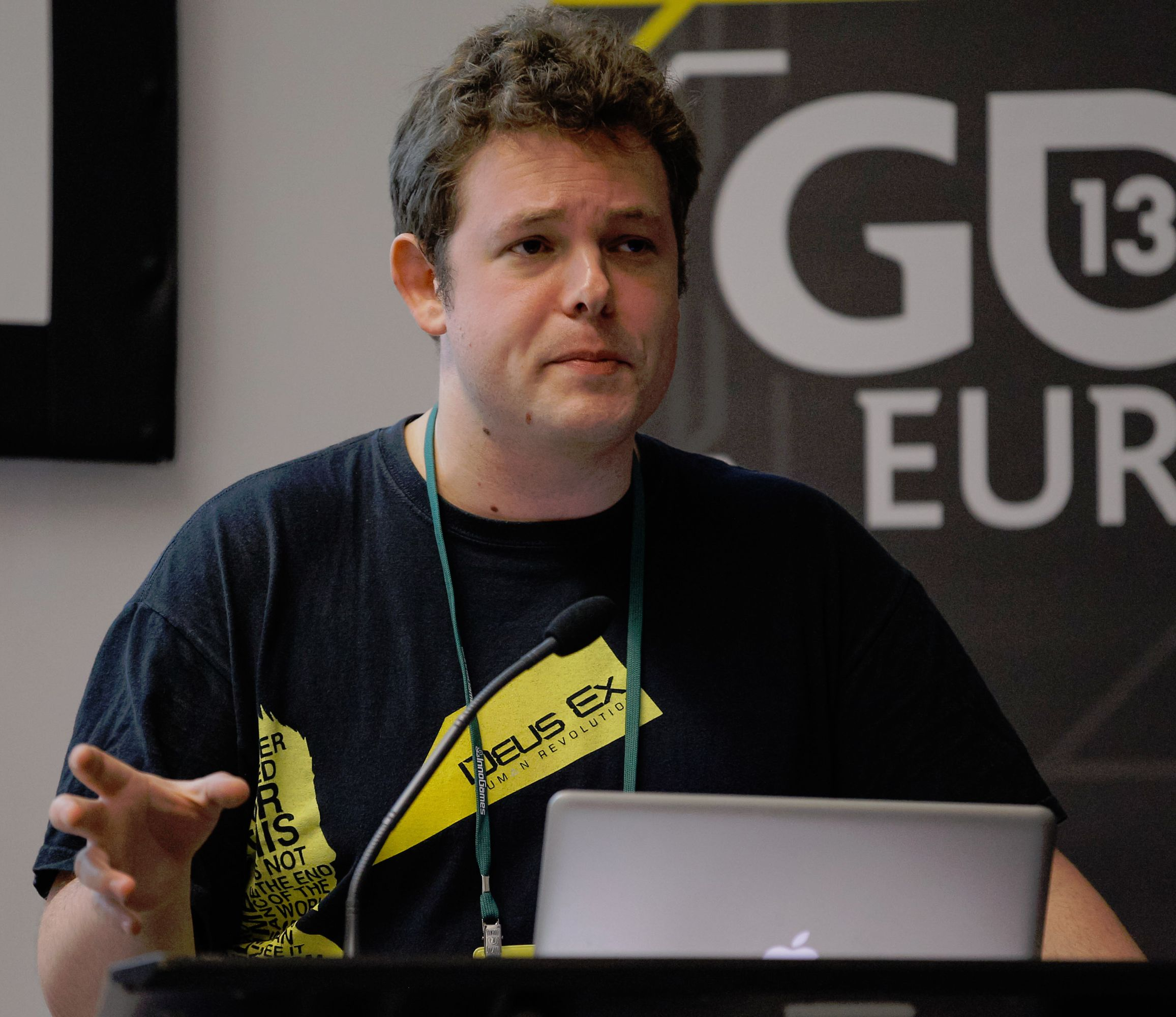
Designer Mike Bithell in 2013

Subsurface Circular was developed by British video game designer and developer Mike Bithell along with a small team. Bithell had been pitching another game idea during the March 2017 Game Developers Conference. He recognised that negotiations for launching development of this game would take several months, and wanted to keep busy during this time, thus starting development of Subsurface Circular shortly after his return. Bithell was inspired by old text adventure games such as those he programmed as a youth on the BBC Micro, and decided to try creating a modern take on the genre with a short and focused narrative. He also wanted to explore the ideas of how robots will eventually replace humans as the primary workforce in the future, and how ethical and political issues around a sentient robotic workforce would be seen, comparing the situation to historical and modern-day insurgencies.

The game was announced and released for Microsoft Windows and macOS via Steam on 17 August 2017. Bithell considers this as a first of his "Bithell Shorts", games that are short and inexpensive that allow him to experiment with narrative approaches, while he continued to work on his next major release. Bithell planned this as a short game, one that would "respect [ones] time" to be completed within a single play session and not linger and remain unfinished as many AAA titles he felt can be. As he knew the game was short, he did not want to create great expectations for players, and opted to announce and release the game on the same day. Though Bithell had been concerned that the game's short length fell within the time period that would automatically grant a refund to players that requested it, he found that after about a month, only 2% of those that purchased the game had sought a refund. Bithell considered this validation of the short-game model approach, though commented that his case may be exceptional since he is an established and recognized developer. Bithell said he was able to recoup production costs within three weeks of the game going live.

A port for iOS devices was released on 23 October 2017.

A version for the Nintendo Switch was announced on 15 February 2018, and released on 1 March 2018; this version utilizes the Switch's gyroscopic sensors so that the player can look around the environment by tilting the console.

In May 2018, Bithell released a followup game titled Quarantine Circular.

== Reception ==
Reception

Review scores
Publication	Score
Destructoid	8/10
GamesRadar+	4/5
Nintendo Life	10/10
Polygon	9/10
VideoGamer.com	8/10

Subsurface Circular received high acclaim from critics. Upon release, the game received “generally favorable reviews” according to review aggregator website Metacritic, which gave the game a score of 79 based on 22 critic reviews.

Polygon reviewer Colin Campbell welcomed Bithell's idea of creating a series of short, experimental and narrative-driven games. Campbell complimented Subsurface Circular's "rich narrative landscape" presented through its dialogue and characters.

Liam Croft of Nintendo Life praised the writing and called the game a landmark in interactive storytelling. He gave the game a perfect 10/10 score.

The game was nominated for "Writing or Narrative Design" at the 2018 Develop Awards.
