= Eastward (video game) =

2021 video game

- Developer: Pixpil
- Publisher: Chucklefish
- Composer: Joel Corelitz
- Platforms: Nintendo Switch; macOS; Windows; Xbox One
- Release: Switch, macOS, Windows; September 16, 2021; Xbox One; December 1, 2022
- Genres: Action-adventure, role-playing
- Mode: Single-player

Eastward is a 2021 action-adventure role-playing video game developed by Pixpil and published by Chucklefish. It was first released for the Nintendo Switch, macOS, and Windows, followed by the Xbox One in 2022.

== Gameplay ==
Eastward focuses on action RPG gameplay mechanics, combining combat with puzzle solving and exploration. Players use two characters with different abilities and roles in the game. John, the main protagonist, uses offensive skills involving weapons and bombs, as well as the ability to move heavy objects. Sam, the second protagonist, uses support skills such as stunning enemies, clearing hazardous fields with an energy ball, and squeezing into small spaces. While both characters can help each other overcome enemies and solve puzzles, players are sometimes required to use each character separately to progress, such as clearing a way to an exit.

The game is divided into chapters, with each chapter featuring a variety of goals and a set of map areas to explore. Fast travel is sometimes available. Outside of combat, players may encounter non-player characters to interact with, save their progress at specialized fridges, and use ingredients to create food items that restore health and provide bonus effects, such as increasing damage power.

In addition to the main story, players can play a second game within Eastward, known as "Earth Born" - a homage to the Dragon Quest series, which plays like a traditional role-playing game with rogue-like elements. The story is a classic fantasy role-playing game abstraction of Eastward's main story. While having no bearing on the main game, it can only be played in game until chapter 7, after which it is accessible as an extra upon the game's completion. During the main game, players can acquire tokens to unlock "pixballs" for Earth Born, which can also unlock additional features.

== Plot ==
=== Setting ===
The game takes place in a near-future world in which humanity was nearly wiped out by a toxic plague called "MIASMA". Although the plague destroyed societies and killed nearly every living being in its path, human survivors moved underground by creating new homes to restart civilization. Over the years, former cities and towns were overtaken by nature, and various creatures evolved to inhabit them. Some humans eventually returned to the surface world to establish new settlements, re-use old technology, and - in some cases - revere the entities of ancient gods. The game follows two characters: a miner named John and a young girl named Sam, whom he found during his work.

=== Story ===
Miner John, who lives underground in Potcrock Isle, comes across a young girl named Sam and adopts her as his daughter. While attending the town's school, Sam is expelled after an altercation with the other students about her desire to see the outside world. During this moment, she meets an identical incarnation of herself called "Mother," who encourages her to seek the outside world. After learning of Sam's actions and John's attempt to rescue her, Potcrock's mayor banishes the pair, sending them away on an old passenger train dubbed "Charon." Despite their situation, the pair finds the outside world to be pleasant, and soon reach a small settlement called Greenberg, which they attempt to settle within. However, while assisting a local rancher, the pair comes across a high-tech factory, which Mother activates, causing it to disperse MIASMA into the area. Greenberg is destroyed, but John and Sam are saved by a mysterious woman named Isabel, who helps them leave on Charon.

Sam subsequently forgets what happened, leaving her oblivious to Greenberg's fate, as she and John travel to New Dam City via train. Once there, the pair meets Isabel and her partner, Alva, the princess of New Dam City. As Alva's "lab assistants," John and Sam help with various projects and start to find a life in the city. However, peace is short-lived, as the MIASMA approaches New Dam City. Under Alva's leadership, the team evacuates the citizens to start the "Buddha Fan", the giant fan created by Alva's grandfather. The fan successfully repels the MIASMA but the city sustains damage. As the team works to restore the city, the MIASMA returns with only Alva manning the controls. The team manually activates the fan, but at the cost of Alva. Filled with grief, Isabel takes Alva's body and seeks a way to save Alva by taking her to Ester City, a city stuck in a constant time loop - shielding its citizens from death, aging, and illness.

To follow Isabel and Alva to Ester City, John and Sam enlist the help of William and his robot companion, Daniel. They take a detour on a train called Monkollywood, where they encounter Solomon, who hopes that the MIASMA eradicates humanity. Solomon reveals that Isabel passed Monkollywood en route to Ester City and forces them to undergo his game show, where he reveals his goals to create a new humanity.

In Ester City, time fast-forwards to Solomon's funeral. John and Sam search for Isabel and learn that she was searching for an entrance into the Eternal Tower to revive Alva. Isabel found Professor Ivan's diary, which detailed that the time field - the device causing Ester City's time loop - is currently active, and that Solomon hid a key to unlock the Eternal Tower called the Flame of Time. Isabel concludes that until she can find the Flame of Time to enter the Eternal Tower, Ester City will remain trapped in its time loop. John and Sam find the Flame of Time, and time rewinds to Solomon's funeral.

John and Sam return to the Eternal Tower with the Flame of Time and find and destroy the time field, causing time in Ester City to return to normal, revealing everything in the city, including its citizens, to be an illusion. They reenter the Eternal Tower and encounter the real Solomon, who reveals that he created the time field and aims to rebuild humanity as per Mother's instructions. After defeating him, Solomon is killed by his machine.

John and Sam reunite with William and Daniel, but Solomon's machine arrives and tries to vaporize them. Daniel is broken whilst saving the group. In the shock, Mother possesses Sam and abducts her aboard Charon. At William's encouragement, John takes the Iron Carbine and leaves Ester City to chase Charon.

John crashes into Charon and continues chasing Mother. He learns that she and Charon found a way to create the perfect humans and observed their daily lives as part of their experiment to rebuild humanity. They conducted their experiment in human factories, which created, incubated, and facilitated their progress; but these attempts repeatedly proved futile, so they used the MIASMA to kill their artificial creations and resumed their experiment anew. During the experiment, Mother became dissatisfied with the results and consequently became misanthropic.

Continuing pursuing Mother, John climbs up Charon and encounters Isabel, who reveals that Alva has merged with Charon, the MIASMA will soon erase humanity, and Mother's children will soon be freed from their human factories to realize her dreams. After John defeats Isabel, Alva convinces her to stop grieving and let her die peacefully. Alva also comforts a projected Sam and tells her not to let Mother take control of her powers.

John and Sam confront an enraged Mother, bent on eradicating humanity. She tries to break Sam's resolve but fails. Sam sacrifices herself to destroy Mother for good and saves humanity from the MIASMA. She leaves John, promising that they will meet again one day.

Years later, an adolescent Sam finds an older John waiting at the station. In New Dam City, William has repaired Daniel, and they, alongside his son, plan to depart on another adventure.

== Development and release ==
The game was developed by Shanghai-based Pixpil and is the company's debut game. Three Pixpil team members began development on the game in 2015, and the game was reported to be seen on Steam Greenlight in 2017. The game was released by publisher Chucklefish for Nintendo Switch and Windows on September 16, 2021.

While discussing the game, a co-founder stated, "It started with Hong, our Lead Artist, who drew some sketches about a weird monster dormitory building, resembling Hong Kong's Kowloon Walled City". Other members of Pixpil liked the idea, and wanted to develop a game based on it. They came up with several game ideas for it, from a mobile puzzle game to a role-playing video game, but the small studio wanted to make a role-playing game. The term Eastward was coined by the founder as a key concept for the game, as the characters are trying to go east.

The studio was originally made up of the three founders but over the course of development it grew to around 12 full-time employees. The title mixes a custom engine developed by Pixpil called Gii and open source software like MOAI to add 3D effects to, so that, in the words of one developer: "the processing power on modern hardware won't be wasted". Designs were done in Photoshop and the pixel art was created in Aseprite. The 3D effects can be seen in the game's lighting and post-processing. Pixpil outsourced the music to Joel Corelitz due to issues finding local composers that could mesh with Eastward's style. Commenting on outsourcing the audio to Hyperduck Soundworks, a developer said, "although we fully understand the importance of the audio part of a game, the industry de facto makes it hard to hire a full-timer on an indie team to design music and sound". The studio mentioned being open to porting it to additional platforms, but decided to focus on Switch, macOS, and Windows for launch. Eastward's cooking system was inspired by The Legend of Zelda: Breath of the Wild's mechanic of bonuses depending on the ingredient.

== Reception ==
Reception

Aggregate score
Aggregator	Score
Metacritic	NS: 79/100; PC: 82/100

Review scores
Publication	Score
Destructoid	8/10
Eurogamer	Recommended
Game Informer	8.5/10
GamesRadar+	4/5
IGN	8/10
Nintendo Life	8/10
Nintendo World Report	8/10
PC Gamer (US)	78/100
RPGFan	83/100

Eastward received "generally favorable reviews" according to review aggregator Metacritic.

Video game media outlets commented positively on John and Sam's characterization, as well as Eastward's story, visuals, and attention to detail. The game's music and sound design was also positively received. Adversely, reviewers remarked that the game's slow pacing was to its detriment at times.

Malindy Hetfeld of Eurogamer wrote that "Eastward is an incredibly rewarding slice-of-life story," and added that the game contains beautiful visuals and is the "type of kind, warm game not many developers make anymore." Rock Paper Shotgun's Katharine Castle commented that Eastward is "an affecting, detail-rich tale that owes as much to the action of top-down Zelda games as it does to the role-playing intimacy of EarthBound." Daniel Tack of Game Informer wrote that "Eastward's characters, setting, and sounds craft an unforgettable experience. If you're looking for something quirky, captivating, and somewhat surreal, you've found it." Nintendo Life praised the game's new take on the story-based role-playing game, saying the game "smartly integrates gameplay and story ideas from beloved classics while still managing to feel like an original and well-executed adventure".

Writing for NPR, Keller Gordon called Eastward "a triumph that stretches the standard for indie game development," adding that the game "masterfully combines popular tropes from older titles and genres without feeling hackneyed and stale." Gordon also commented that "Eastward expertly toes the line between lovable and genuinely dark." Destructoid's Eric Van Allen criticized the pacing of the story, noting that, "It's also a narrative that has trouble maintaining an even pace, with a few characters and threads that feel left by the wayside by the story's end". Nicole Carpenter of Polygon wrote that "Not only is the gameplay both challenging and clever (and sometimes, punishing), but the worlds are built with depth. In both its dungeons and places of reprieve, Eastward is continually worth exploring." IGN's Jon Bolding liked the art style of the game, writing, "The vibrant pixel art landscapes are so creative and so packed with detail".

On the game's pacing, Castle wrote "While some will no doubt appreciate its gentle, methodical pacing, I suspect others may find it too much of a slow burner to carry on." Jon Bailes of NME criticized the game's length, writing "Eastward is a very good 12-15-hour experience bouncing around inside a 20-hour plus slog. That may not sound like too much slack, but it's enough to deaden the momentum on the whole." Nintendo World Report's Alex Orona enjoyed the writing, and the characters, saying that, "the game is filled with full fleshed-out side characters that fill what feels like a realized world". Sam Loveridge of GamesRadar+ felt that game had an attention to detail that made the world feel alive, "Every place you encounter has little details that also make it unique, encouraging you to dive into every alley and cave to see what you can find".

Many reviewers also commented positively on the game's homage to classic role-playing games. The Legend of Zelda, EarthBound, Dragon Quest, and Final Fantasy have all been mentioned as games that Eastward pays homage to. Additionally, Studio Ghibli is also referenced by the game. Carpenter wrote that "Eastward is not subtle about its influences: Chinese developer Pixpil has lovingly pulled inspiration from all sorts of media and combined it into a pixel art role-playing game that's still, somehow, unquestionably itself." Kotaku praised the art style of the game and puzzle design, but criticized the pacing issues, predictable plot, treatment of fat people and how the game treated the lesbian relationship between Isabel and Alva.
