= Necropolis (video game) =

2016 video game

- Developer: Harebrained Schemes
- Publishers: Harebrained Schemes (PC); Bandai Namco Entertainment (PS4, XONE)
- Directors: Christopher Kohnert; Dennis Detwiller
- Producers: Rebecca Mayfield; Eric Studer; Chris Klimecky
- Designers: Connor Monahan; Trevor King-Yost
- Composer: Jon Everist
- Engine: Unity
- Platforms: Microsoft Windows; OS X; PlayStation 4; Xbox One
- Release: Windows, OS X; WW: July 12, 2016; PlayStation 4, Xbox One; WW: October 4, 2016; PAL: December 12, 2016 (PS4)
- Genres: Action role-playing, roguelite
- Modes: Single-player, multiplayer

Necropolis is an action role-playing game developed by Harebrained Schemes and published by Bandai Namco Entertainment. The game was released for Microsoft Windows and OS X in July 2016, and for PlayStation 4 and Xbox One in October 2016.

== Plot ==
The game's plot involves an archmage named Abraxis and his efforts in a secret underground tomb to practice magic far from civilization. The player takes on the role of various adventurers who have arrived at this strange, otherworldly Necropolis with unknown motivations—loot, glory, and exile all give way to the need for escape.

== Gameplay ==
Necropolis is a third person action role-playing game. The game is set in a labyrinth in an abstract dimension and features moving platforms and hidden treasure. Players are able to alter parts of the world by solving puzzles. Enemies include dead adventurers, wild animals, and abandoned machinery. Abraxis' servant, the Brazen Head, assists in shaping the environments and assigning tasks, which both constantly change. Combat consists of timed attacks and attack patterns, relying heavily on movement and placement of the player character. Items such as potion ingredients and books are collectible.

As in most "rogue-lite" games, death results in a permanent loss of items and progress, and requires the player to begin a new save file. There are certain cosmetic items that can be purchased with in-game currency on various levels, but these can only be applied to the player character at the creation of a new save file. The player can have only one active save file. The collectible books ("codexes") allow certain equipped effects on the player character. These can be applied at the end of each level, before descending to the next. These abilities range from higher jump, to higher money and item drop rates.

As of the latest update, there are two playable adventurer classes: the Blackguard (speed), and the Brute (strength).

== Development ==
The game was featured at PAX 2015, where it was named Destructoid's Editor's Choice winner. It was released for Microsoft Windows and OS X on July 12, 2016, and was released for PlayStation 4 and Xbox One on October 4, 2016.

== Music ==
The game's soundtrack was composed by Jon Everist, who had worked with Harebrained Schemes in the past with the Shadowrun series. Hardcore Gamer stated that Everist's score was "incredible", which providing several "haunting, orchestral yet minimalistic themes that perfectly fit the mood without ever overshadowing things".

== Reception ==
Reception

Aggregate score
Aggregator	Score
Metacritic	PC: 59/100; PS4: 57/100; XONE: 65/100

Review scores
Publication	Score
Destructoid	7/10
Eurogamer	Recommended
GameRevolution	3/10
GameSpot	6/10
Hardcore Gamer	4.5/5
IGN	6.5/10
PC Gamer (US)	68/100
Polygon	5.5/10

Necropolis received "mixed or average" reviews, according to review aggregator Metacritic.

Destructoid took issue with the game's unengaging structure, crafting, and lack of content while finding the combat and multiplayer fun. GameRevolution praised the aesthetics and criticized the unresponsive, repetitive, unengaging gameplay, and poor fusion of genres. Eurogamer, by contrast, recommended the game, citing its lore, codexes, combat, and multiplayer as positives. IGN noted that the game was best enjoyed with friends and that the roguelike structure and Soulslike combat were conflicting ideas that made the experience dull despite everything else the game did right. PC Gamer gave the game 68 out of 100, saying, "Ghoulish creature design and fun combat are weakened by long boring stretches, clueless AI, and snickering obscurity." Polygon concluded their review by writing, "Necropolis goes through all the motions, but it's missing the heart, and the smarts, of the hyper-difficult games it's trying to imitate." GameSpot praised the intense combat, fast-flowing mechanics, irreverent humor, and attractive visuals while criticizing the permadeath, obtuse item descriptions, and occasionally clumsy combat.
