= The Solitaire Conspiracy =

- Developer: Bithell Games
- Publishers: Bithell Games; Ant Workshop
- Composer: Jon Everist
- Platforms: Windows; PlayStation 5; Xbox One; Xbox Series X/S; Nintendo Switch
- Release: Windows; October 6, 2020; Consoles; November 3, 2021
- Genre: Solitaire
- Mode: Single-player

The Solitaire Conspiracy is an indie solitaire and FMV video game developed by Mike Bithell and published by Ant Workshop. It was released for Windows on October 6, 2020, where it was self-published by Bithell himself, and November 3, 2021, for PlayStation 5, Switch, Xbox One and Xbox Series X/S. The player is cast as a spymaster who must manage teams of spies, represented by playing cards, in order to stop a supervillain's plans. The game received mixed reviews from critics, who praised the graphics but whose opinions were divided on the excitement of the gameplay and quality of the story.

== Plot ==
The player starts off as a spymaster in the service of a freelance intelligence agency called Protega. A mysterious villain known as Solitaire shut down Protega's means of communication with its field agents, and the player, with the assistance of their handler, Jim Ratio (Greg Miller), who speaks to them in FMV cutscenes, starts to rebuild the communications network by sending their spies on missions around the world. Each spy group is represented by a different deck of cards.

While Ratio appears hapless at first, a spy known as Diamond (Inel Tomlinson) relays that something is wrong. The behavior of Ratio (whose name contains the letters for "traitor") is later revealed to be an act, and he is exposed as Solitaire, whose ultimate plan is to trick the player into handing him control of the spy network under the guise of working for Protega. Dropping the act, he attempts to persuade the player, but the player rebuffs him and goes rogue, cutting off communications with Solitaire.

== Reception ==
Reception

Aggregate score
Aggregator	Score
Metacritic	70/100

Review scores
Publication	Score
GameSpot	7/10
VideoGamer.com	6/10

The game's PC version received an aggregate score of 70 out of 100 on Metacritic, indicating "mixed or average" reviews.

Peter Glagowski of TheGamer rated the game 4/5 stars, calling it short but "refreshingly stylistic", and praising the story as "rather cool", but noting that there was little that the game had changed about the base game of solitaire and that skilled players could "blitz" the campaign easily.

Andrew King of GameSpot rated the game 7/10 points, calling the game "exciting", "well-paced", and "a solid take on solitaire", but criticizing the story as "weak" and "too static to work well as a spy thriller", calling it "like a dress rehearsal via Zoom call". He praised Miller's acting as Jim Ratio, but called him unconvincing as Solitaire.

Josh Wise of VideoGamer.com rated the game 6/10 points, criticizing its tone and "low-rent comic" themes, and stating that the plot twist "came as no surprise whatsoever".
