= Quarantine Circular =

2018 video game

- Developer: Mike Bithell Games
- Publisher: Mike Bithell Games
- Composer: Dan le Sac
- Platforms: Microsoft Windows, macOS, Nintendo Switch
- Release: Microsoft Windows. macOS; 22 May 2018; Nintendo Switch; 8 December 2018
- Genre: Text adventure
- Mode: Single-player

Quarantine Circular is a text-based adventure game developed and published by Mike Bithell Games. The game was released for Microsoft Windows and macOS in May 2018 and for Nintendo Switch in December 2018. It is the sequel to Subsurface Circular.

== Gameplay ==
Quarantine Circular is a conversation-based adventure game, presented in a three-dimensional, third-person perspective. The player controls a variety of characters who make decisions to resolve the situation. Options are limited depending on the character, reflecting their preconceptions.

== Synopsis ==
In the wake of an epidemic that is threatening the human race, an alien is found, captured, and kept in quarantine until the world organization dedicated to containing the rampant disease — the IDCF (or International Disease Containment Fleet) — can communicate with the alien and find out why it is here. The choices made will dictate how the story unfolds.

== Release ==
Quarantine Circular was developed by Mike Bithell Games and released for Microsoft Windows and macOS through Steam. It was released on Nintendo Switch on 8 December, 2018. Unlike its predecessor, it was not released on iOS.

== Reception ==
Reception

Review scores
Publication	Score
VideoGamer.com	7/10
The Digital Fix	10/10

Quarantine Circular was received positively by professional critics.

The game was criticized by VideoGamer reviewer Alice Bell for being less focused than the previous game Subsurface Circular and for having simpler puzzles by Dualshockers reviewer Micahel Ruiz.
