= Volume (video game) =

2015 video game

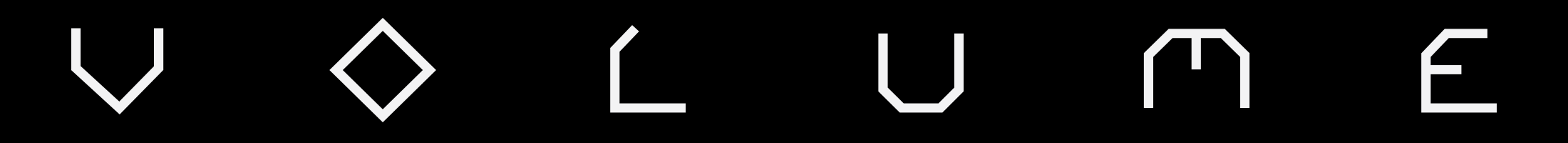
- Developer: Mike Bithell Games
- Publisher: Mike Bithell Games (Note: Retail versions published by Limited Run Games.)
- Composer: David Housden
- Platforms: Microsoft Windows; OS X; PlayStation 4; PlayStation Vita
- Release: Windows, OS X & PS4; 18 August 2015; PS Vita; 6 January 2016
- Genre: Stealth
- Mode: Single-player

Volume is a stealth and indie game by Mike Bithell Games. It was released for Microsoft Windows, OS X, and PlayStation 4 in August 2015, and the PlayStation Vita in January 2016. The game uses stealth mechanics inspired by Metal Gear Solid series, allowing the player to plan courses of action to work through levels without being detected by guards, dogs, and automated security turrets to reach specific objectives. In addition to the game's levels, Volume supports user-made levels that can be shared with others. The game presents a modern take on the Robin Hood legend, where a young thief discovers a plot for a military coup involving various heists, and uses a device called "Volume", with the assistance of its artificial intelligence to perform these heists in a virtual manner and broadcasting them to the world at large to make the coup known. The story is presented with the help of voice actors Charlotte McDonnell (formerly Charlie McDonnell), Danny Wallace, Dan Bull, James Stephanie Sterling, and Andy Serkis.

== Plot ==
Volume's story is based on a modern take of the Robin Hood legend. Robert Locksley (voiced by Charlotte McDonnell) is a petty thief that finds a device called "Volume", which allows the user to simulate heists that is part of a secret military coup attempt. The device has an artificial intelligence built into it named Alan (Danny Wallace) that acts as "the Microsoft Office paperclip as a military training program", according to Bithell, and guides Robert on how to use the device. Robert decides to use the device to broadcast the simulations of high-profile crimes across the Internet in the same manner as Let's Play videos. Locksley eventually faces off against Guy of Gisbourne (Andy Serkis), re-envisioned for the game as the CEO of a company that has taken over the country of England and runs the nation as a corporatocracy.

It is hinted in-game that Volume is set in the same timeline as that of Thomas Was Alone, also developed by Mike Bithell, but set after the events of that game.

== Gameplay ==
Volume's approach is similar to the Metal Gear series, in this case, showing the player as Robert (bottom center) in virtual heist against guards (knightlike figures) and their current cones of vision.

Volume's gameplay has been designed by Bithell similar to the stealth elements of the Metal Gear Solid series. The game is presented in a top-down third-person view of the Volume simulation, showing a floor layout, Robert's avatar, and several guards and other antagonists that patrol the area. Several different variety of guards exist, each of which have different patterns of movement and how they respond to seeing the player character; such guards include archers that have a long range of vision, rogues that can see in a full circle around them, dogs that work by sense of smell and track the player by proximity, and automated turrets that react much faster than other guards. When spotted, the player has a short amount of time to attempt to break the line of sight and take cover, otherwise the simulation will restart, either fully or at the most recent checkpoint that the player has crossed. Guards behave in established patterns, and the player can disrupt these by making noise, such as flushing a toilet, or purposely cross their line of sight to draw them away from a patrol route. The player is unable to kill these foes, but over the course of the story, gain an arsenal of tools to distract them and avoid detection; once the player has one or more such tools, they can create a loadout for their character to select which gadgets they wish to take into a level.

The goal is to sneak through the level without being spotted to complete various heists. En route, the player needs to collect gems that are scattered through the level before the exit point will become available. Players can track global leaderboards based on how fast they completed a level, with the game allowing players to revisit earlier levels to improve their times.

The game contains 100 story-based levels. Additionally, the game includes a level editor, allowing users to create their own simulated missions. Players are required to complete their own levels before uploading them to be shared with others.

== Development and release ==
Bithell's inspiration for Volume was directly from his earlier enjoyment of playing the Metal Gear games since he was a teenager. Though several other stealth games have come out since then, Bithell felt the newer games lost the "purity" of the stealth experience that Metal Gear provided.

The user-generation aspects for Volume were inspired by The Document of Metal Gear Solid 2 that was on the Metal Gear Solid 2: Substance disc, during which Metal Gear's game designer, Hideo Kojima, designed prototypes of levels in real-life using Lego bricks. Bithell designed the in-game level editor to work similar to Lego, allowing the player to snap-in predesigned elements onto new or existing levels, including the game's core levels. Bithell hopes that Volume would have an active user-community that will continue to evolve the game over many years, similar to that of Vampire: The Masquerade – Bloodlines where the player community has continued to work on improving the game five years after release.

Bithell expected that Volume would still have a limited budget, £30,000 compared to the £5,000 he needed for Thomas Was Alone, but the extra funding has been used to hire additional programming help and 3D modelers. On the New Year of 2014, Bithell had to be taken to a hospital due to overworking himself on Volume. Following his treatment, he opted to bring on more staff to help complete the more ambitious title, with a 15-man team by the game's completion. Some included his former colleagues at Blitz Games, where he had worked during the development of Thomas Was Alone, and additional help came from members of Curve Digital, who had previously ported Thomas to the PlayStation platforms. David Housden, who composed the Thomas soundtrack, would also create the music for Volume.

Bithell announced the game in August 2013, using a carefully managed approach to assure the news was widely disseminated on a specific day, promising further announcements on its voice cast and story at future gaming conventions. Volume was originally planned to be a timed exclusive for the PlayStation 4 and Vita platform sometime in 2015, with the Windows and OSX releases set a month later. Later, the release was set to be simultaneous across all platforms on 18 August 2015; while the PlayStation 4, Windows, and OS X versions were released on this day, Bithell stated that the Vita version was delayed by a few weeks to better refine the title. Bithell later confirmed that the game would be released as a CrossBuy title for the Vita in January 2016, the additional time used to polish the game based on player feedback. The Vita version was released on 6 January 2016. Limited Run Games published a limited edition physical release of the game: PS Vita version on 11 November 2016, and PS4 version on 4 May 2018.

Bithell had already worked with Danny Wallace from Thomas Was Alone. For the role of Gisborne, Bithell had listed Andy Serkis high on his list of desired actors. Serkis has responded positively to Bithell's script, and they were able to arrange for his voice acting between Serkis' busy schedule. Bithell contends that Serkis brought "a great amount of gravitas" to the character to help flesh out the game. With Serkis' involvement, Bithell changed the character of Gisborne to better suit Serkis' acting style, making the character more fiendish than an evil genius.

A free expansion, Volume: Coda, has been announced to be released in 2016 alongside Sony's PlayStation VR unit. It includes 30 additional levels, and enables the game to be played on the VR unit, though it is not required. The new levels extend the game's story, following the trials of "The Troubleshooter", a person that was captured by the government forces after the actions of Locksley in the main story, and includes new voice actors for additional characters.

== Reception ==
Reception

Aggregate scores
Aggregator	Score
GameRankings	(PC) 78.40% (PS4) 71.67%
Metacritic	(PC) 80/100 (PS4) 71/100

Review scores
Publication	Score
Destructoid	6/10
Eurogamer	Recommended
Game Informer	8.75/10
GameSpot	8/10
GamesRadar+	3.5/5
IGN	8.1/10
PC Gamer (US)	72/100
Polygon	9/10
VideoGamer.com	8/10

Volume received mostly positive reviews. Aggregating review websites GameRankings and Metacritic gave the Microsoft Windows version 78.40% based on 21 reviews and 80/100 based on 33 reviews and the PlayStation 4 version 71.67% based on 12 reviews and 71/100 based on 15 reviews.
