= Kinda Funny =

Online entertainment company

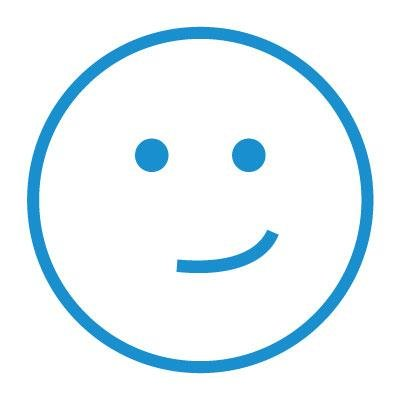
- Industry: Entertainment
- Genre: Comedy, video games
- Founded: January 4, 2015; 11 years ago
- Founders: Greg Miller; Colin Moriarty; Nick Scarpino; Tim Gettys
- Headquarters: San Francisco, California, U.S.
- Services: Online video Community website

YouTube information
- Channel: Kinda Funny
- Subscribers: 299 thousand
- Views: 324.5 million
- Last updated: January 4, 2025
- Website: kindafunny.com

Kinda Funny is an online entertainment company that produces videos and podcasts on video game culture, film, television, and comics.

Kinda Funny creates content on two YouTube channels: The primary Kinda Funny channel features comedy videos such as Kinda Funny: The Animated Series, as well as Kinda Funny's flagship podcast 'The Kinda Funny Podcast' (formerly 'The GameOverGreggy Show'). While Kinda Funny Games is the company's video game arm focusing on Let's Plays and weekly podcast The Kinda Funny Gamescast. Since June 19, 2017, the Kinda Funny Games arm of the company has produced a live, daily, video games news podcast for YouTube and Twitch, under the name "Kinda Funny Games Daily".

== History ==
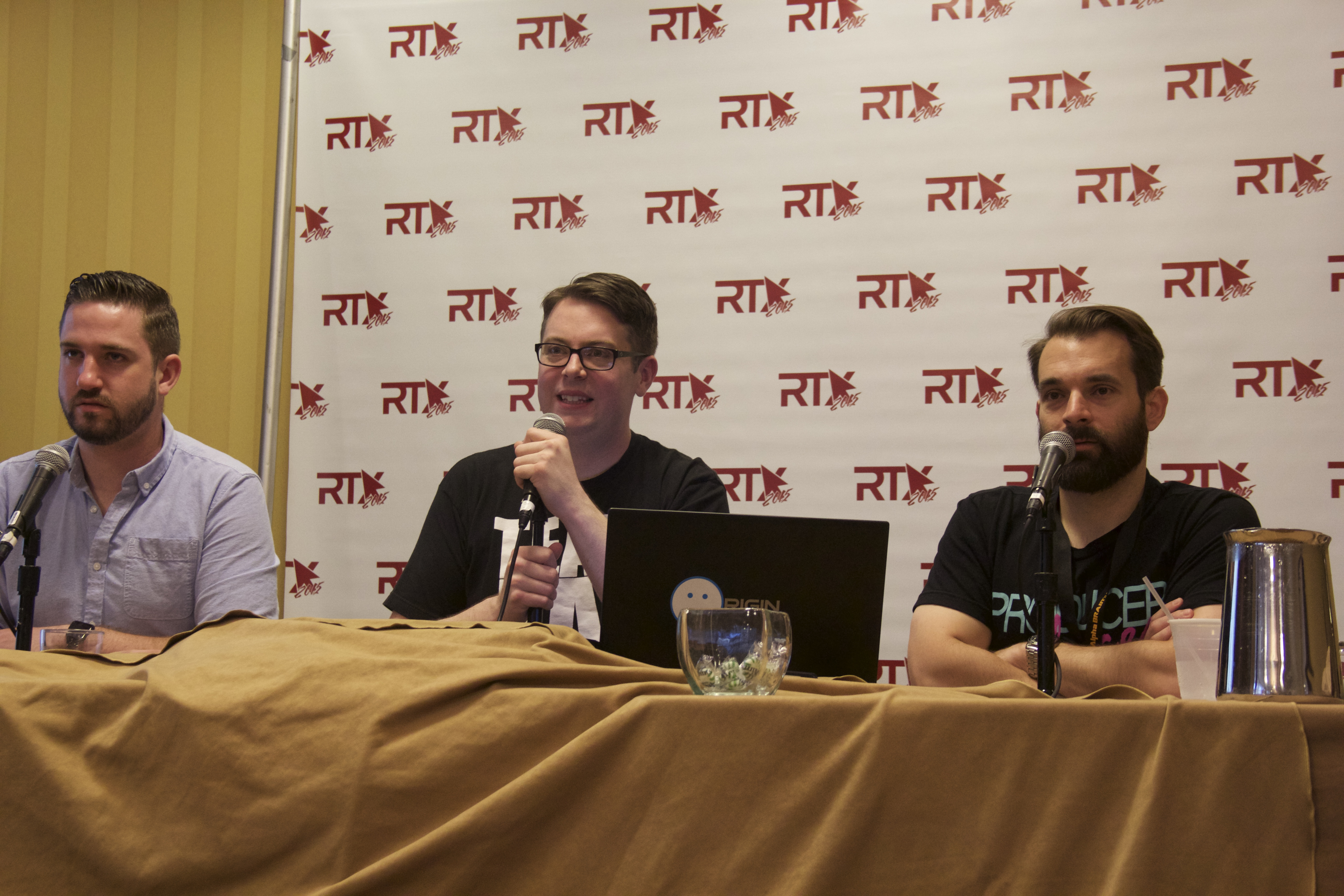
Kinda Funny founders (from left) Tim Gettys, Greg Miller, and Nick Scarpino at RTX in 2015

IGN editors Greg Miller and Colin Moriarty created The GameOverGreggy Show in 2013 as a side project, following the popularity of A Conversation With Colin on Greg's personal YouTube channel, GameOverGreggy. Video producers Nick Scarpino and Tim Gettys, also from IGN, later joined the team. In fall of 2014, they launched a Patreon for the channel and rebranded it as Kinda Funny. They received $10,000 in funding within the first 24 hours.

On January 5, 2015, the Kinda Funny team left IGN to start their own entertainment venture, which would allow them to cover video game topics that had previously been off limits to Kinda Funny due to their conditions with IGN. The new company was funded primarily through viewer support and crowdfunding on Patreon.

The channel covers games, film, television, and comics, as was covered at IGN, but often touches on other topics such as politics and snack foods. Their crowdfunding had raised $30,000 in the months leading up to their decision, and $10,000 the day of their announcement. Soon after, they raised close to $35,000 a month between two Patreon accounts. Ben Kuchera of Polygon viewed the news as evidence that fan-funded content had reached new levels, and remarked that content-creators served to make more money when fans paid creators directly rather than the creators using advertising to raise money from fans. The team also continued to freelance for IGN after they left.

On March 30, 2016, Kinda Funny formed a partnership with Rooster Teeth by joining the LetsPlay Network and now occasionally appear in video content on the LetsPlay channel, as well as selling merchandise through the Rooster Teeth online store and participate in LetsPlay events.

New Kinda Funny content featured during one of GameSpot's two stage shows at the 2016 Electronic Entertainment Expo.

On March 13, 2017, Colin Moriarty announced his resignation from the company following outcry over a controversial joke posted on Twitter, citing a difference in creative vision with the rest of the Kinda Funny co-founders.

In January 2019, Kinda Funny announced Kinda Funny 4.0. This included the end of The Morning Show and the beginning of many new weekly shows. These include Internet Explorerz, KF/AF, Screencast, Party Mode, and Debatable. The group also retooled their podcast lineup; most notably they retired the long running GameOverGreggy Podcast and replaced it with The Kinda Funny Podcast. The Kinda Funny initiative was kicked off with a month long Patreon fundraiser drive.

== Shows ==
Shows include:

=== General ===
- Kinda Funny In Review
- Kinda Funny Morning Show
- KF/AF
- We Have Cool Friends
- Internet Explorerz
- NickNames
- Screencast
- The Kinda Funny Podcast
- Greg's Comic Book Club
- Love, Sex, & Stuff (formerly known as Love & Sex Stuff)
- Cooking with Greggy
- Debatable
- Kinda Funny Doodles
- Kinda Funny: The Animated Series
- Kinda Funny Showdown (Variety Gameshow)
- Colin & Greg Live

=== Gaming related ===
- Kinda Funny Games Daily
- Kinda Funny Gamescast
- Party Mode
- A Conversation With Colin
- The PlayStation VR Show
- Kinda Funny Reacts
- Kinda Funny First Impressions

=== Kinda Funny's game of the year ===
- 2014 Greg: South Park: The Stick of Truth / Tim: Super Smash Bros. 3DS/WiiU / Colin: Shovel Knight
- 2015 Greg: Metal Gear Solid V: The Phantom Pain / Tim: Metal Gear Solid V: The Phantom Pain / Colin: Rocket League
- 2016 Uncharted 4: A Thief's End
- 2017 The Legend of Zelda: Breath of the Wild
- 2018 God of War
- 2019 Star Wars Jedi: Fallen Order (2. Control / 3. Resident Evil 2)
- 2020 Final Fantasy VII Remake (2. The Last of Us Part II / 3. Hades)
- 2021 Ratchet & Clank: Rift Apart (2. Returnal / 3. Deathloop)
- 2022 God of War Ragnarök (2. Elden Ring / 3. Sifu)
- 2023 The Legend of Zelda: Tears of the Kingdom (2. Marvel's Spider-Man 2 / 3. Alan Wake 2)
- 2024 Astro Bot (2. Final Fantasy VII Rebirth / 3. Metaphor: ReFantazio)
- 2025 Clair Obscur: Expedition 33 (2. Dispatch / 3. Hollow Knight: Silksong)
