= BattleTech (video game) =

2018 video game

- Promotional artwork
- Developer: Harebrained Schemes
- Publisher: Paradox Interactive
- Directors: Jordan Weisman; Mike McCain
- Producer: Mitch Gitelman
- Composer: Jon Everist
- Series: BattleTech
- Engine: Unity
- Platforms: macOS; Windows; Linux
- Release: macOS, Windows; April 24, 2018; Linux; November 27, 2018
- Genre: Turn-based strategy
- Modes: Single-player, multiplayer

BattleTech is a mech turn-based strategy video game developed by Harebrained Schemes and published by Paradox Interactive. It was released on macOS and Windows on April 24, 2018, with a Linux release on November 27, 2018. The developers set aside US$1 million to create the game, and turned to Kickstarter to secure funding for additional features, including a single player campaign, an expansion of that campaign, and a player versus player multiplayer mode.

In the game, the player assumes the role of a mercenary commander leading a team of powerful combat vehicles called battlemechs. The player is responsible for selecting each mech's model, armor, pilot, armaments, and skills, and controls a team of four mechs (a 'lance') in combat. The world of BattleTech is dominated by powerful noble houses locked in a devastating war, and the player selects one or more houses to serve.

The game shares a setting with the board game that launched the BattleTech franchise, Classic BattleTech, and many members of the development team have worked on previous games in the franchise. This includes both of the studio's co-founders; Jordan Weisman created the franchise while at FASA, and Mitch Gitelman was the producer for MechCommander and MechAssault.

== Gameplay ==
BattleTech is a turn-based strategy video game. Players assume the role of a mercenary commander leading a "mech lance", or group of four giant humanoid-shaped combat vehicles. The developers state that the game will have the spirit of the board game but will not use the board game's rules. The player selects each mech's chassis, the weapons and armor mounted on that chassis, as well as smaller details such as actuators and gyros that influence a mech's turning radius. In addition to choosing hardware, the player can also specialize the mech's pilots (called "mechwarriors") by selecting talents from a skill tree.

== Setting ==
BattleTech shares a setting with the original board game, now called Classic BattleTech. The game takes place during the 3025 Succession Wars Era, in which powerful noble houses employ an ever-shrinking number of giant fighting vehicles called battlemechs ('mechs for short), piloted by individuals called MechWarriors, to fight for control of the Inner Sphere. The fighting has lasted for so long, and has been so intense, that it has caused technological regression. The small number of remaining 'Mechs makes them exceptionally valuable to the warring houses, and the player will have the opportunity to select which house or houses to serve.

In a map published by Harebrained Schemes during the Kickstarter campaign, the Inner Sphere is depicted as an area of space stretching between 400 and 600 light-years away from Earth in every direction. It is divided between five major states, each tied to a noble house, and four minor states. Each major state borders Earth and expands outward, while the minor states occupy small areas on the outside edge of the map known as The Periphery.

The game takes place in the peripheral realm of the Aurigan Reach. The Reach is governed by the Aurigan Coalition which is made up of several independent systems led by noble houses in accordance with the standard Inner Sphere feudal system. The Reach lies between the peripheral realms of the Taurian Concordat and the Magistracy of Canopus, and bordering the Inner Sphere Successor State of the Capellan Confederation. Much of the Aurigan Reach is made up of former holdings from the Taurians, Magistracy, and Capellans, though the three realms abandoned many of the systems for defensibility reasons. After their abandonment, the Reach systems became unified under Arano family and began consolidating and expanding, incorporating not only the abandoned planets into the Aurigan Coalition, but even annexing border planets from their neighbors.

The Aurigan Reach was created by the Harebrained Schemes design team led by Kiva Maginn as a space where players could move through an original story line without infringing on the already set lore of Third Succession Wars BattleTech. "Our first priority was to find a way to coexist with BattleTech lore... We needed somewhere interesting, close but not too close, and basically empty. A blank slate where we could do whatever needed to be done to make our story work." The area of space chosen for a Reach was a blank space between the Magistracy of Canopus and the Taurian Concordat that had planets occupying it, but has little to no mention in sourcebooks, novels, or other media.

== Story ==
The main campaign of the game begins in 3022 with Kamea Arano, daughter of Tamati Arano, hiring the player (a former pupil of Raju "Mastiff" Montgomery, who also trained Kamea) to serve as her honor guard for her coronation along with Mastiff. At the time of the events, tensions are mounting between her and her uncle, Santiago Espinosa, who has become increasingly dissatisfied with the rule of House Arano. On the day of Kamea's coronation, a coup d'état is launched by the newly established Aurigan Directorate, an autocracy led by Espinosa. Mastiff and the player attempt to help Kamea to safety, but the player is forced to eject from their Battlemech due to sabotage, as the capital planet Coromodir and the entire Aurigan Reach falls to the Aurigan Directorate. Kamea and Mastiff are reported dead, with the player being rescued by a mercenary company called Markham's Marauders.

The player joins the Marauders, and by 3025 the player becomes the leader of the mercenary company. After a disastrous contract for a mining company led to the company losing out on payment and under heavy debt, the mercenaries receive financial support from Magestrix Kyalla Centrella of the Canopus Magistracy to retrieve the Argo, an ancient dropship, from bandits as an unsanctioned mercenary job.

The player reunites with Kamea, who survived the coup and has been in hiding along with her trusted advisor Alexander Madeira. Kamea reveals the salvage operation of the Argo was a test of the player and their mercenaries, as well as a means to equip them in order to fight the Directorate on her behalf, with financial backing from the Magistracy. The player and Kamea are tasked with the liberation of the Reach under the banner of the Aurigan Restoration. The player's mercenaries begin using and restoring the Argo as their mobile base of operations.

Arriving at the Aurigan planet Weldry to liberate it, Kamea instructs the player to assault the Icebox, a prison for dissidents against the Directorate. Liberating the prison, Kamea finds among the dead is Mastiff, who had also survived and was captured during the coup, but passed away some time later in captivity. Kamea moves onto Panzyr with the player where they uncover a Star League-era Black Box. The only contact they know that can decrypt it being the head of House Karosa of Smithon, an Aurigan planet under Directorate control. Meanwhile, a massacre of ten thousand citizens occurs in a chemical attack in the Taurian Concordat planet of Perdition.

After liberating Smithon, Lord Karosa refuses to cooperate with Kamea, bitter about his son's incarceration at the IceBox and his daughter's death under Directorate rule. In exchange for Karosa's aid, the player destroys a Directorate weapons smuggling dropship, and in the process capture Espinosa's daughter and Kamea's cousin Victoria. Karosa decrypts the black box, which gives intel about an ancient Star League Defense Force (SLDF) outpost on the planet Artru.

On Artru, the Restoration uncovers an enormous cache of high-tech SLDF battlemechs, but are attacked by Commodore Samuel Ostergaard of the Taurian Concordat. The Taurians reveal have allied with the Directorate in the wake of the attack on Perdition, and Ostergaard mentions his son was killed on Smithon by the Restoration forces. At the same time, the Argo becomes infected by an SLDF computer virus when the cache is opened. Backed into a corner, Kamea destroys the entire cache to deny them from the Taurians and Directorate, escaping with only a small handful of Battlemechs, while the virus is isolated and contained on a drive on board the Argo. With the backing of their new allies, the Directorate begins a counter-invasion on the recently liberated worlds of the Restoration, leading to the deaths of multiple House Lords loyal to the Restoration - including Karosa, who is killed during Victoria's escape from incarceration on Smithon.

Heading to the planet Itrom, Lord Gallas offers the Restoration an opportunity to break the alliance between the Directorate and Concordat - she reveals a lead on some valuable information located on House Madeira's homeworld of Guldra. Alexander offers to go to his homeworld while the Restoration defends against Taurian incursions on their worlds. Alexander is able to recover the information that Victoria carried out the chemical attack on Perdition as a means to spark the Taurians into action. Alexander is discovered by the Directorate and, despite the Restoration's attempts to rescue him, Kamea makes the difficult decision to leave him behind.

After liberating the planet Tyrlon from the Directorate, the Restoration reveals the incriminating evidence of the attack on Perdition. In response, the Taurian Concordat officially ends their alliance with the Aurigan Directorate. The Restoration finally moves on to the capital of Coromodir, but Commodore Ostergaard has gone rogue due to his personal grudge against Kamea and attempts to destroy the capital city. The player's mercenaries use the contained virus from the SLDF cache, and upload it to Ostergaard's ship, resulting in a crash that kills him and destroys many Directorate forces. Meanwhile, Kamea's forces take the capital and Santiago Espinosa surrenders. Victoria refuses to surrender and challenges Kamea by offering Alexander's life for a final duel - where the player and Kamea are ultimately victorious. Kamea is crowned the rightful ruler of the Aurigan Reach and she contemplates how the Restoration campaign shaped her to be a ruler. She says while future remains uncertain for the Reach, the player and their mercenaries will be remembered in stories as a hero for years to come.

== Development ==
BattleTech was developed by Harebrained Schemes. The studio is led by Jordan Weisman, who created the BattleTech franchise while working at board game and wargaming publisher FASA. Many members of the development team worked on another game in the franchise, MechCommander. Along with Weisman, the development team will be led by Mitch Gitelman, the producer for MechCommander and MechAssault, and Mike McCain, who served as creative director for Harebrained Scheme's games in the Shadowrun franchise. Harebrained Schemes is working with Catalyst Game Labs and Piranha Games, who also publish BattleTech works, to maintain continuity across the franchise. This includes using art from Piranha Games' MechWarrior Online.

Studio co-founders Weisman and Gitelman implied in a May 2015 interview that they might soon be announcing a game based on an intellectual property that they had previously created, with Game Informer speculating that they meant either BattleTech or Crimson Skies. BattleTech was revealed in July 2015. The Kickstarter campaign for the game launched on September 29, 2015, and received its funding goal of US$250,000 within an hour. The studio had already committed $1 million to the development of the game before launching the Kickstarter, which would fund a basic "skirmish mode". The Kickstarter campaign set stretch goals of $1 million, $1.85 million, and $2.5 million to fund a single player campaign, an expansion to the campaign, and an online player versus player multiplayer mode, respectively. The $1.85 million level would add procedurally generated levels and would make the campaign open-ended, allowing for an indefinite campaign. Harebrained Schemes planned to release the game in early 2017 for Linux, macOS, and Windows.

According to Weisman, fans of the franchise had been asking for a new BattleTech game for years, and the only thing holding his team back was that they did not own the rights to the game, which are held by Microsoft. Weisman was not interested in developing a spiritual successor, stating in an interview that the fantasy mech game Golem Arcana was as close as he was willing to get towards creating a BattleTech game without the license.

Harebrained Schemes chose the turn-based strategy genre because they wanted the game to play out at a slower, more methodical pace. Weisman emphasized that in a turn-based game, players could be presented with the chances of success or failure for each action, and have time to think through their decisions. In an interview with PC Gamer, he explained that the idea was to make a game with "even more depth than we did in the old days as a pen-and-paper but make it fluid and fast playing so you're focusing on the strategy, not on the mechanics". This depth is reflected in the number of options players have in customizing their mechs. Players that are only interested in combat, however, will be able to play the game without spending time on customization.

The studio wanted the game to feel realistic and believable, with Gitelman explaining "We're grounding BattleTech, so it doesn't just feel like this goofy sci-fi future". Harebrained Schemes paid special attention to ensuring that the size of the mechs was apparent to players, despite the limitations of the top-down view in showing scale. This informed several of the team's decisions. The development team intentionally set the mechs to move at a slow pace, and the in-game camera shakes when they move. The mechs' movement also leaves cracks in the ground and causes damage to objects in the environment.

In May 2017, Paradox Interactive announced that they had partnered with Harebrained Schemes to publish the game, meaning that they will provide additional funds, as well as marketing and localization support. In August 2017, Paradox announced that the game had been delayed to 2018 in order to give the development team more time to refine the game.

== Music ==
This desire to approach the game with realism extends into the soundtrack composed by long-time collaborator Jon Everist, who explained in interviews that he wanted the soundtrack to be grounded in "empathy for the characters" and to "approach the score as if it were for a film or TV series". The soundtrack, largely orchestral, was recorded in Hungary, Germany, Seattle and Latvia and mixes live elements with an eclectic mix of analog and modular synths. Jon Everist won several awards for the score, and was nominated for "Best Video Game Score of the Year" at the 34th Annual ASCAP Screen Music Awards along with God of War, Destiny 2, Torn and Celeste.

== Downloadable content ==
Paradox Interactive and Harebrained Schemes have announced three downloadable content expansions for BattleTech.

The first DLC, Flashpoint, features self-contained, procedurally-generated missions which do not affect or influence the main game. In these missions, decisions must be made that will change the progress of the self-contained story chains. The missions also introduce a concept called "consecutive deployments", in which mechs are unable to be repaired between missions. The DLC also includes new mechs, a new biome, and a new multiplayer mode. Flashpoint was released on November 27, 2018, alongside Version 1.3 of the main game.

The second DLC, Urban Warfare, adds three new vehicles, new equipment, two new battlemechs and ten new Flashpoint missions. The main focus of the DLC is the introduction of urban environments with destructible buildings. Urban Warfare was released on June 4, 2019.

The third DLC, Heavy Metal, adds eight new weapon systems, eight new battlemechs (including a design created for the game), and a Flashpoint mission which sets the player against two characters from Wolf's Dragoons mercenary company. A free update for the base game, released simultaneously, added a further two battlemechs and support for third-party mods. The DLC was released on November 21, 2019.

== Reception ==
Reception

Aggregate score
Aggregator	Score
Metacritic	80/100

Review scores
Publication	Score
Destructoid	8/10
Edge	8/10
IGN	7/10
Jeuxvideo.com	15/20
PC Gamer (US)	85/100
PCGamesN	9/10

At launch, the game received generally positive reviews upon release.

=== Accolades ===
Year	Award	Category	Result	Ref
2017	Game Critics Awards	Best Strategy Game	Nominated	
2018	Golden Joystick Awards	PC Game of the Year	Nominated	
2018	The Game Awards 2018	Best Strategy Game	Nominated	
2019	National Academy of Video Game Trade Reviewers Awards	Game, Strategy	Nominated	
2019	ASCAP Composers' Choice Awards	2018 Video Game Score of the Year	Nominated	

== See also ==
- List of turn-based strategy video games
- List of Paradox Interactive games
