= Crimson: Steam Pirates =

2011 video game

- Developer: Harebrained Schemes
- Publisher: Bungie Aerospace Corporation
- Designers: Jordan Weisman; Mitch Gitelman
- Programmers: Aljernon Bolden; Christopher Kohnert
- Artist: Mike McCain
- Composers: Dominik Hauser; Alexander Khaskin; Elliot Simons
- Engine: Moai
- Platform: iOS
- Release: September 1, 2011
- Genre: Strategy

Crimson: Steam Pirates is a strategy iOS game developed by Harebrained Schemes and published by Bungie Aerospace Corporation and released on September 1, 2011. The game was designed by Harebrained Schemes co-founder Jordan Weisman, who had previously created the Crimson Skies franchise.

== Critical reception ==
Reception

Aggregate score
| Aggregator | Score |
|---|---|
| Metacritic | 88/100 |

Review scores
| Publication | Score |
|---|---|
| Gamezebo | 4/5 |
| MacLife | 4.5/5 |
| Pocket Gamer | 3.5/5 |
| Common Sense Media | 5/5 |

The game received "generally favorable reviews" according to the review aggregation website Metacritic.
