= Harebrained Schemes =

American video game developer

Harebrained Schemes, LLC
- Type: Subsidiary
- Industry: Video games
- Founded: 2011; 15 years ago
- Founder: Jordan Weisman; Mitch Gitelman
- Headquarters: Seattle, Washington, US
- Parent: Paradox Interactive (2018–2023)
- Website: harebrained-schemes.com

Harebrained Schemes, LLC is an American video game developer based in Seattle, Washington. It was co-founded in 2011 by Jordan Weisman and Mitch Gitelman. Prior to founding Harebrained Schemes, Weisman and Gitelman worked together on the MechCommander and Crimson Skies franchises at FASA, another company founded by Weisman. As of 2015, the studio had under 60 employees. The studio was acquired by Paradox Interactive in June 2018, and became independent again on January 1, 2024.

== History ==
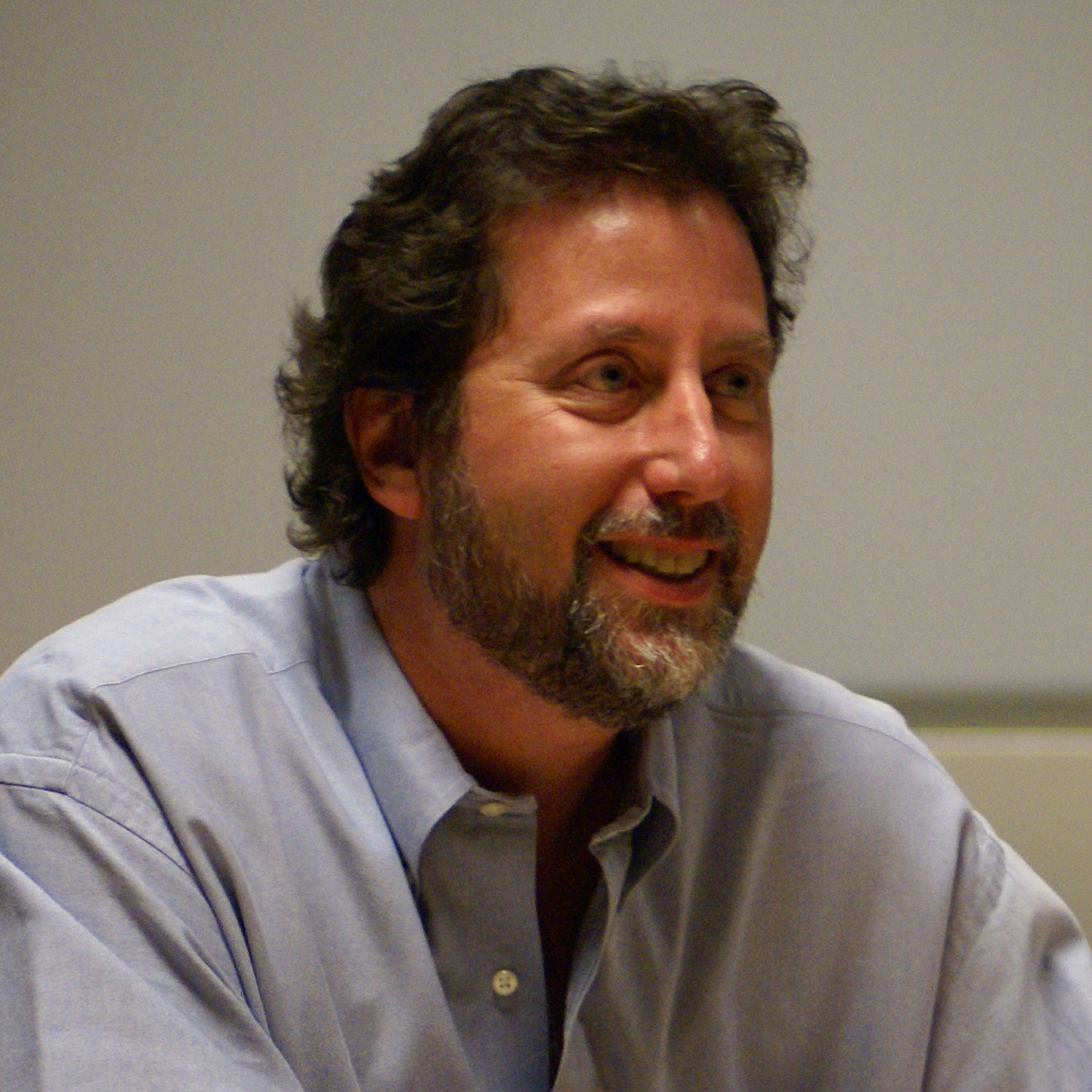
Studio co-founder Jordan Weisman in 2006

In 2011, Weisman and Gitelman reunited to work on the mobile game Crimson: Steam Pirates, which became Harebrained Schemes' first game. The following year, the studio released a second mobile game, Strikefleet Omega. Both games were well received, with Crimson: Steam Pirates making Metacritic's "Best iPhone Games of 2011" list and Strikefleet Omega making the Google Play store's "Best Games of 2012" list.

Harebrained then went on to develop several games in the Shadowrun franchise. In 2012, the studio raised $1.8 million through Kickstarter to fund the development of Shadowrun Returns, becoming only the third studio to raise $1 million on Kickstarter. The studio had been considering using Kickstarter as a funding source since 2011, but it was not until the Kickstarter for Broken Age raised over $3 million that Harebrained Schemes felt that the crowdfunding platform could be a viable funding option. The game was released in mid-2013. One of the campaign's stretch goals was a second city, which became the expansion campaign Shadowrun: Dragonfall. Dragonfall was released free to backers of Shadowrun Returns, and in September 2014 was re-released (still free to backers) as a stand-alone game, Shadowrun: Dragonfall – Director's Cut.

The studio returned to Kickstarter to fund Shadowrun: Hong Kong in early 2015. Work on Shadowrun: Hong Kong had already begun using the studio's own funds by the time that the Kickstarter campaign was launched; the money raised through Kickstarter instead went towards expanding the amount of content that they would be able to put into the game. The studio set a funding goal of $100,000, which it reached in two hours; the campaign would go on to raise $1.2 million. The series has been well reviewed by critics. Shadowrun Returns received an aggregate rating of 76/100 on Metacritic. As an expansion, Shadowrun: Dragonfall received a score of 81/100, while the stand-alone re-release received a score of 87/100. Shadowrun: Hong Kong received a score of 81/100.

In addition to its Shadowrun titles, Harebrained Schemes also funded the development of the board game Golem Arcana through Kickstarter. Released in August 2014, Golem Arcana uses a physical game board and miniatures, supported by a mobile app that manages fog of war, the game's rules, and gameplay events. The board and app communicate using a Bluetooth stylus. The Kickstarter for Golem Arcana raised just over $500,000. In 2014 the studio also announced that they were developing Necropolis, an action-roguelike set for release in 2016. A pre-Alpha version of the game was featured at the 2015 PAX East conference.

In mid-2015, the studio announced that they were preparing to hold a fourth Kickstarter to fund a new game in the BattleTech franchise, set to be titled Battletech. There had been speculation that the studio would create a game in either the BattleTech or Crimson Skies franchise, owing to Weisman's role in the creation of those franchises. The Kickstarter campaign for Battletech was launched on September 29, 2015. Like Shadowrun: Hong Kong, Harebrained Schemes already allocated funding for Battletech, and the intention of the Kickstarter was to raise funds for additional features. The major goals for the Kickstarter were a single player campaign if $1 million was raised, an expanded campaign if $1.85 million was raised, and multiplayer if $2.5 million was raised. The Kickstarter's initial goal was $250,000, which it reached in under an hour.

In 2018 Paradox Interactive acquired Harebrained Schemes for US$7,500,000.

In October 2023, Paradox Interactive announced that The Lamplighters League was a commercial disappointment and that significant layoffs had taken place at Harebrained Schemes prior to the completion of the game. Following the tepid performance of The Lamplighters League, Harebrained Schemes and Paradox Interactive announced that they had reached a mutual agreement to go their separate ways, which allowed Harebrained Schemes to regain their independence from January 1, 2024 onwards. Paradox retains ownership of their previously released games.

== Games developed ==
Year	Title
2011	Crimson: Steam Pirates
2012	Strikefleet Omega
2013	Shadowrun Returns
2014	Shadowrun: Dragonfall
2014	Golem Arcana
2015	Shadowrun: Hong Kong
2016	Necropolis
2018	BattleTech
2023	The Lamplighters League
TBA	GRAFT
