= Mike Bithell =

English video game designer and developer

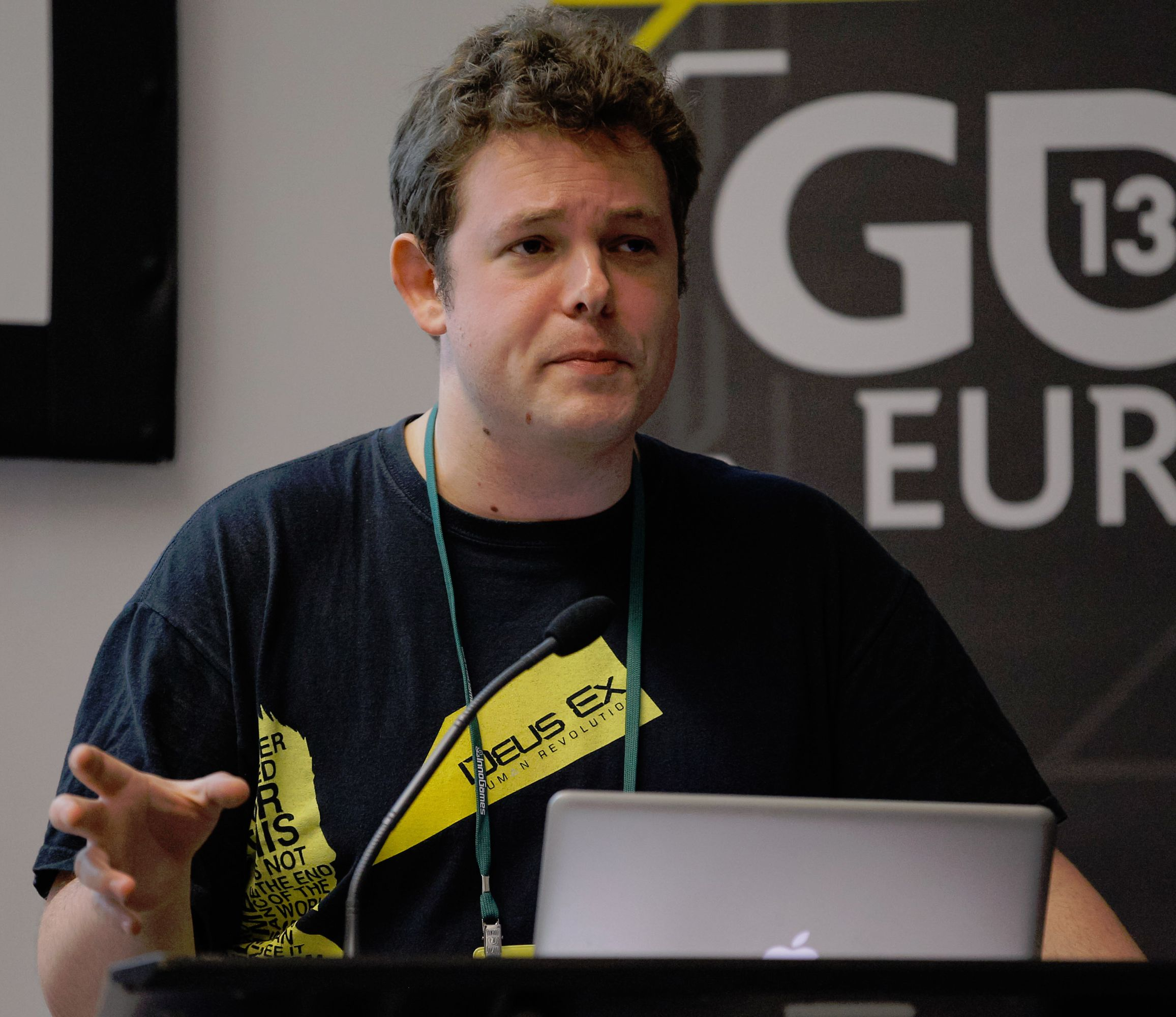
- Bithell at GDC Europe, 2013
- Born: Michael Bithell; 7 November 1985 (age 40)
- Occupation: Video game developer
- Years active: 2010–present
- Known for: Thomas Was Alone, Volume, Play, Watch, Listen
- Mike Bithell talking about Thomas Was Alone Published June 2013
- Website: www.bithellgames.com

Michael Bithell is an English video game designer, developer, and podcaster best known for his work on Thomas Was Alone and Volume. He is a regular host of the Play, Watch, Listen podcast, along with Alanah Pearce, Troy Baker, and Austin Wintory. He also co-hosts an evolving pop culture podcast with long time friend, British YouTuber and comedic author Daniel Hardcastle, talking about shows and movies like Star Trek, Fast and Furious, Mission Impossible and various others.

== Career ==
Bithell credits his high school history teacher for helping him to get into games programming: when their class was given an essay assignment, Bithell asked instead if he could make a point-and-click adventure game about the topic in lieu of an essay. The teacher was impressed with the work and allowed Bithell to continue to present games instead of essays for the class.

Bithell independently developed an early version of the Thomas Was Alone video game in 2010 while working for Blitz Games, where he was a junior designer, and later a level designer on games such as Tak and the Guardians of Gross, Invincible Tiger: The Legend of Han Tao, iCarly and Dead to Rights: Retribution, from 2007 to 2011. He developed the prototype game in 24 hours and released it for free online through the Kongregate website, receiving 100,000 'plays' in the first week. He joined Bossa Studios in February 2011, working to expand the flash-based Thomas to a full title and learning how to use the Unity engine in his time there. The full game was released on 30 June 2012 and went on to sell over a million copies, winning a BAFTA at the 9th British Academy Games Awards in the "Best Performer" category (for narrator Danny Wallace) and receiving a further two nominations ("Best Original Music" and "Best Story"). He left Bossa in January 2013 to "concentrate on indie development". He has since worked on a Robin Hood-based stealth game named Volume, which was released on 18 August 2015 for Windows, OS X, and PlayStation 4 and Vita platforms. In 2016, Bithell released EarthShape, a virtual reality game for Google Daydream. Bithell collaborated with composer Russell Shaw and animator Tim Borelli on the project. The game featured voice acting from British comedian Sue Perkins. In August 2017, Bithell released a new game Subsurface Circular, a first of what he calls "Bithell Shorts" that are designed as short, narrative focused games. In May 2018, Bithell released another short titled Quarantine Circular.

Bithell is the lead developer behind John Wick Hex, a video game based on the John Wick film series.

Bithell has gained significant notability in the video game industry due both to the unexpected success of Thomas and also for his views on the current industry as a whole. He has outlined the problems for fellow indie developers producing mobile games, commenting on the suitability of free-to-play mechanics for indie gaming and other issues.

Following release of Tron: Catalyst in 2025, Bithell had to let go of eleven, most of his full-time staff, at Bithell Games due to failing to secure funding for a follow-on project.

== Games ==
- Thomas Was Alone – 2012, self-published
- Volume – 2015, Bithell Games
- Subsurface Circular – 2017, Bithell Shorts
- Quarantine Circular – 2018, Bithell Shorts
- John Wick Hex – 2019, Bithell Games / Good Shepherd Entertainment
- The Solitaire Conspiracy – 2020, Bithell Games
- Arcsmith – 2021, Bithell Games
- Tron: Identity – 2023, Bithell Games
- Tron: Catalyst – 2025, Bithell Games / Big Fan Games
