= Golem Arcana =

2014 tabletop game

- Developer: Harebrained Schemes
- Publisher: Harebrained Schemes
- Producer: Ray Winninger
- Platforms: Android, iOS
- Release: 13 August 2014
- Genre: Miniature wargaming
- Mode: Multiplayer

Golem Arcana is a 2014 tabletop miniature wargaming game developed and published by Harebrained Schemes for iOS and Android devices. The game combines physical miniatures on a game board with a mobile app that much of the gameplay takes place in; the physical pieces and the app communicate through the use of a Bluetooth stylus. Several elements of the game, including special abilities and optional missions, exist only within the app.

Golem Arcana was funded through a Kickstarter campaign that launched in September 2013 and went on to raise over $500,000. The game was released just under a year later, on 13 August 2014. Both studio co-founder Jordan Weisman and executive producer Ray Winninger had extensive experience developing both video games and tabletop games, and one of their primary motivations in creating Golem Arcana was to merge the two gaming types. They also sought to create a more social experience than could be found in traditional multiplayer video games.

The game received mixed reviews upon release. Critics were split in their take on the hybrid of physical pieces and the digital app, with some seeing it as a boon and others as a detriment. The game received praise for its visuals, lore, and ruleset, but also received criticism for its price.

The game has been out of production, with no active development, since 2016.

== Gameplay ==
Golem Arcana is a two to eight-player miniature wargaming game that interfaces with a digital app through the use of a Bluetooth stylus. Players compete against one another in one of several scenario types, including eliminating the opponent's golems or capturing and holding a specific area of the map. The ultimate goal of the game is to collect a set number of "victory points", which are gathered by defeating opposing golems, completing scenario objectives, and as rewards for completing optional missions encountered through the app.

Each player controls a number of physical miniatures called golems, which are placed on a game board built with interchangeable map tiles. Each map tile is divided into nine squares arranged 3 by 3, and has terrain features pre-printed on it. Golems come in small, large, and very large sizes. Up to four small, two large, or one large and two small golems can share a square on a map tile. The very large "colossus" golems take up an entire square by themselves. Each golem comes with a card that lists the actions it can take. Another type of card, known as relics, allow players to active special abilities including healing and resurrection.

The golems, cards, and game board are covered in small magnetic dots. A Bluetooth stylus that comes with the starter kit reads the dots to transmit information from the board to a mobile app. Gameplay information such as the position of all of the golems, terrain and map effects, and the game's rules are stored in the app, which uses that information to determine and present players with available moves, attack accuracy and damage, and other statistics. Players then use the stylus to choose where to move and what actions to take; players still have to move the physical pieces on the board, but their moves are also reflected in the app. The game also has several components that exist only within the app. The base game includes around 70 knights, which in the game's lore are sorcerers that control the golems. Players pair each golem with one knight, or three knights for the "colossus" golems, and different knights provide golems with different bonuses. Players can also use spells, in the game's lore by evoking ancestral gods called Ancient Ones. Ancient Ones are cast using mana, which can be acquired in several ways, including when a golem that the player controls is defeated or though missions that appear in the app. Players encounter missions, which provide optional objectives in exchange for victory points, while moving around the map. In some cases not completing the missions offers alternative rewards. Harebrained Schemes collects aggregate data on the decisions that players make in the game and uses it to alter the game's lore.

== Development ==
We're trying to keep the attention [on the tabletop] for that social experience.

— Ray Winninger, executive producer of Golem Arcana

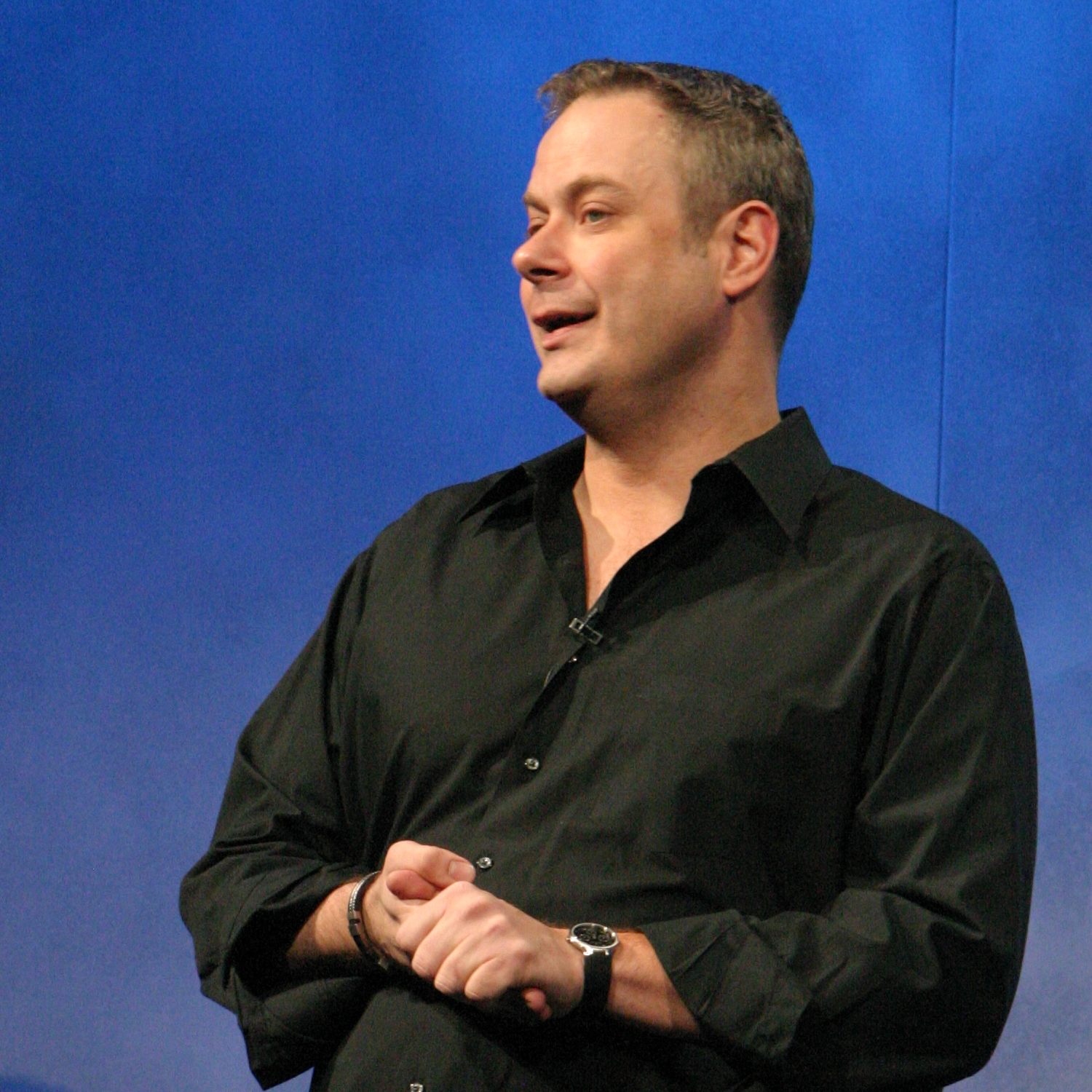
Executive producer Ray Winninger in 2008

Golem Arcana was announced in July 2013 in a blog post on developer Harebrained Schemes' website. The blog post indicated that the studio would return to Kickstarter to fund the game, and that most of the studio's staff would continue to work on their other project, Shadowrun Returns, while a few would be split off to work on Golem Arcana. The Kickstarter campaign was launched on 10 September 2013 and ran until 15 October 2013, with a funding goal of $500,000. Backers could get the base game by pledging at the $55 Kickstarter reward tier.

The game was released on 13 August 2014, with the digital component available for both iOS and Android. In addition to the base game, a number of expansion sets have been released. Expansions sets contain three miniatures as well as cards and abilities. Harebrained Schemes has also released "Colossus" expansions, which contain one large miniature instead of the three normal-sized ones. The final expansion, Durani: Champions of the Western Wind, was released on January 27, 2016. A post on the game's official blog indicated that, despite the strong critical reception, sales were not sufficient to justify the millions of dollars spent on development and production. According to a statement sent to ICv2, the studio had ensured that the game's companion app supported as many devices and operating systems as possible at the time, but could not promise compatibility or support in the future.

Both studio co-founder Jordan Weisman and executive producer Ray Winninger had experience developing both tabletop games and video games. One of the studio's motivations for developing the game was to combine the two mediums, with Winninger explaining "One of the spaces we're interested in exploring at Harebrained, and Golem is the first effort, is how can we take those tabletop games that we know and love so much and leverage technology to enhance that experience in some way." Weisman and Winninger also stressed the social nature of the game. Winninger, comparing Golem Arcana to Skylanders, another game with both physical and digital components, stressed that Golem Arcana was less focused on components and more focused on the social experience. Weisman pointed to his disappointment that "kids' idea of playing together after school these days usually means just meeting online from their own houses" in stressing that participants playing against each other in Golem Arcana would do so face-to-face.

== Reception ==
Golem Arcana received mixed reviews upon release. Reviewers were divided on the game's defining feature – the hybrid of physical miniature and digital app, but praised the game's visuals, lore, and rules.

Writing for Rock, Paper, Shotgun, Robert Florence praised the app for calculating variables like movement range and tracking statistics like health and ability cooldowns, but spoke of a disconnect caused by constantly shifting focus between the screen and the board. While ultimately questioning the need for the physical components at all, Florence also saw the game as having potential in the future. Chris Hutton of Tom's Guide took a much more negative view. Hutton found it cumbersome that the starter kit came with only one stylus and that only one device running the app could be synced to a given game at a time, necessitating that the screen and stylus be passed back and forth between players. He also found the stylus itself to be unresponsive, slowing the game down to the point that he lost interest. VentureBeat's Jay Henningsen, on the other hand, had nothing but praise for the app and stylus. After fifteen minutes he found using the stylus to be "almost natural", and found that the app handling all of the rules and stat-keeping made for "one of the easiest experiences I've ever had getting into a new game". He went on to say that players will look to see the technology spread to other miniature wargaming products.

One element that did receive near-universal criticism was the game's price of $80 for the base game. PC World called the price the game's "biggest flaw", Yahoo! Tech called it "hefty" and "a steep investment", and VentureBeat called it "quite the price tag", but qualified their statement by pointing to the large number of items that come with the starter kit.

The game did receive praise for its visuals, storytelling, and rules. The Academy of Adventure Gaming Arts & Design awarded Golem Arcana the "Best Miniature Figure Rules" prize in the 2015 Origins Awards. In an otherwise negative review, Chris Hutton of Tom's Guide praised the storyline and visuals, saying of the latter that "the colorful, interesting terrain created a unique universe". Game Informer praised the game's setting and its "gorgeous visual aesthetic".
