= List of BattleTech novels =

BattleMechs in combat on the cover of Storms of Fate by Loren L. Coleman. Art by Fred Gambino.

More than one hundred full-length BattleTech or MechWarrior science fiction novels have been published by FASA Corporation, ROC, and later by Catalyst Game Labs. They have been translated into at least fifteen languages. Countless other shorter works of BattleTech fiction have been published in BattleCorps, as novellas, or in BattleTech magazines or in BattleTech tabletop game rule books. These works of fiction take place in the BattleTech universe of the 31st and 32nd centuries. They can be considered space opera and military science fiction.

== History ==
FASA published the first BattleTech game set in 1984, and subsequently released a wide range of supplemental books and materials for the series in-house and through licenses (with Roc Books, FanPro, and Activision, for example).

Many BattleTech readers got their first taste of the BattleTech universe with the release of BattleTech-licensed PC games in the 1990's. FASA continued to release books after the PC game release of MechWarrior (1989) with its storyline c.3024-3028 (in the "Late Succession War: Renaissance" period). Many Roc Book releases also appeared to follow the popularity of other BattleTech PC games: More "Clan Invasion" era novels were written after the releases of MechWarrior 2 (1995) and MechWarrior 3 (1999) (both set 3057-3060 during the Clan Invasion), and more "Civil War" era novels were released after MechWarrior 4 (2000) with its storyline in 3062 ("Civil War" era). A loosely-associated MechWarrior six-novel series was also released soon after MechWarrior 3.

FASA ceased producing BattleTech in 2001 and sold the intellectual property (IP) to WizKids. The IP was then split into Classic BattleTech and MechWarrior: Dark Age for a time (from 2002 to 2008). IP holder WizKids was purchased by Topps in 2003, and terminated as a brand in 2008; ever since, the IP to BattleTech (and others) are held directly by Topps. In June 2007, FanPro's license ran out and Catalyst Game Labs (a subsidiary of InMediaRes Productions, LLC) acquired the license to Classic BattleTech in their stead. Catalyst also retained many of the staff members who previously worked for FanPro.

The first official BattleTech novel was William H. Keith's Decision at Thunder Rift (1986) written for FASA. Loren L. Coleman's Endgame (2002), for Roc Books, would be the last canon "Classic" BattleTech novel to be released for the next 13 years, while Roc Books worked on its "MechWarrior: Dark Age" series. Endgame would fix plot lines and character arcs from many previous works.

The story timeline in the FASA & Roc Books novels generally followed along in sequence with the publication dates of the novels. After Endgame, however, Roc Books jumped the timeline ahead to the 32nd-century with its MechWarrior: Dark Age series, beginning with Michael A. Stackpole's Ghost War (2002) and ending with Kevin Killiany's To Ride the Chimera (2008). The 2008 closure of WizKids delayed the release of further novels. Catalyst Game Labs then released its first BattleTech novel, Steven Mohan Jr's. A Bonfire of Worlds (2010), which continued the Dark Age storyline. (A Bonfire of Worlds was in fact initially advertised with a Battletech: Dark Age logo, but a later printed version reverted back to the more traditional BattleTech nomenclature.)

Catalyst Game Labs had received the rights to publish both Classic and Dark Age book lines in June 2007 and had scheduled new works to resume in the fall of 2009. While Catalyst Game Labs' next "Classic" novel, Embers of War, (released after its "Dark Age" novel, A Bonfire of Worlds) was not released until 2015, Catalyst Game Labs had 5 novels total published by February, 2019, and a semi-regular release schedule resuming that year. Embers of War continued the "Classic BattleTech" timeline from where Endgame left off.

Subsequent publications by Catalyst Game Labs have jumped around in the BattleTech timeline, including novels set much earlier than the "Classic" (Succession Wars, Clan Invasion, Civil War) eras, novels between the "Classic" & "Dark Age" eras, and novels set much farther into the future than the "Dark Age" era. Catalyst Game Labs also issues reprints of the FASA/Roc BattleTech novels as its BattleTech: Legends series and collect BattleCorps short stories and "Novellas" into BattleTech: Anthologies.

Several novellas associated with Kickstarter have also been produced for both the Table Top game Battletech and the turn-based strategy game, titled simply BattleTech, by Harebrained Schemes.

== Classic BattleTech novels 1989-2003 ==
The following novels occur during what was referred to the "Classic BattleTech" era, which includes the 31st century and preceding centuries. Also, additional eras have been added, broadening the term. The Classic reference was dropped after the ownership change and rebranding occurred.

Title	Author	Chronology	Published	ISBN	Synopsis
Decision at Thunder Rift	William H. Keith Jr.	c.3024 era: Succession Wars period: Late Succession War - Renaissance	June 1986 (FASA); September 1992 (Roc Books)	ISBN 0-931787-69-6; ISBN 0-451-45184-8	Saga of the Gray Death Legion #1. Book one of The Saga of the Gray Death Legion. Grayson Death Carlyle is the young son of the commander of Carlyle's Commandos, a mercenary unit employed by the Lyran Commonwealth. When the Commandos are destroyed in a sneak attack on the planet Trell I, Grayson must help the people of Trell repel the invading forces while trying to live up to his father's legacy and slay the one who killed him.
The Sword and the Dagger	Ardath Mayhar	c.3025 era: Succession Wars period: Late Succession War - Renaissance	April 1987 (FASA)	ISBN 0-931787-77-7	Ardan Sortek discovers a plot to replace Hanse Davion, First Prince of the Federated Suns, with a double under the control of Maximilian Liao, Chancellor of the rival Capellan Confederation.
Mercenary's Star	William H. Keith Jr.	c.3026 (1 October 3025 - 30 August 3026) era: Succession Wars period: Late Succession War - Renaissance	June 1987 (FASA); November 1992 (Roc Books)	ISBN 1-55560-030-1; ISBN 0-451-45194-5	Saga of the Gray Death Legion #2. Book two of The Saga of the Gray Death Legion. The fledgling Gray Death Legion, formed in the fighting on Trell I, takes on their first assignment: train the inhabitants of Verthandi to fight their Draconis Combine overlords.
The Price of Glory	William H. Keith Jr.	c.3028 (early 3028) era: Succession Wars period: Late Succession War - Renaissance	October 1987 (FASA); January 1993 (Roc Books)	ISBN 1-55560-038-7; ISBN 0-451-45217-8	Saga of the Gray Death Legion #3. Book three of The Saga of the Gray Death Legion. Grayson, now leader of the Legion, accepts a contract to work for the Free Worlds League, but falls prey to a double cross and is unjustly accused of a terrible crime because he finds a cache and a Pre-Successions War Star League base. He has to figure out how to survive the double cross for himself and the men under his command.
Warrior: En Garde	Michael A. Stackpole	c.3027 (1 June 3022 - 10 June 3027) era: Succession Wars period: Late Succession War - Renaissance	June 1988 (FASA); April 1998 (Roc Books)	ISBN 1-55560-046-8; ISBN 0-451-45683-1	Warrior #1. Book one of The Warrior Trilogy. Justin Xiang Allard is exiled from the Federated Suns and makes his way to Solaris VII where he pledges himself to the service of the Capellan Confederation. Melissa Steiner, heir to the throne of the Lyran Commonwealth, is kidnapped and Daniel Allard and the Kell Hounds mercenary unit mount a rescue.
Warrior: Riposte	Michael A. Stackpole	c.3029 (15 July 3027 - 14 February 3029) era: Succession Wars period: Late Succession War - Renaissance	August 1988 (FASA); June 1998 (Roc Books)	ISBN 1-55560-068-9; ISBN 0-451-45685-8	Warrior #2. Book two of The Warrior Trilogy. Tensions surround the marriage of Hanse Davion and Melissa Steiner on Terra, culminating in the onset of the Fourth Succession War. Morgan Kell, co-founder of the Kell Hounds mercenary unit, is recalled from his self-imposed exile to lead the group into war.
Wolves on the Border	Robert N. Charrette	c.3028 (14 September 3021 - 17 August 3028) era: Succession Wars period: Late Succession War - Renaissance	March 1988 (FASA); May 1996 (Roc Books)	ISBN 1-55560-087-5; ISBN 0-451-45388-3	Wolf's Dragoons, a high-profile mercenary unit in the employ of the Draconis Combine, becomes the target of a plot by a devious warlord to permanently secure their services. The unit's friend and Combine liaison Minobu Tetsuhara is caught between duty and friendship as war looms.
Warrior: Coupé	Michael A. Stackpole	c.3029 (27 February 3029 - 15 December 3029) era: Succession Wars period: Late Succession War - Renaissance	April 1989 (FASA); November 1998 (Roc Books)	ISBN 1-55560-073-5; ISBN 0-451-45702-1	Warrior #3. Book three of The Warrior Trilogy. The Fourth Succession War continues and Justin Allard, now a high-ranking member of Capellan intelligence, tries to repel Davion invaders and deal with a possible spy. Morgan Kell and his Kell Hounds approach a showdown with Yorinaga Kurita.
Heir to the Dragon	Robert N. Charrette	c.3040 (3 February 3004 - 18 June 3040) era: Succession Wars period: Late Succession War - Renaissance	August 1989 (FASA) September 1996 (Roc Books)	ISBN 1-55560-095-6; ISBN 0-451-45527-4	During the tumult of the Fourth Succession War and the War of 3039, Theodore Kurita, ambitious son of the conservative Draconis Combine Coordinator, navigates treachery in the court and dangers on the battlefield.
Lethal Heritage	Michael A. Stackpole	c.3051 (19 May 3049 - 12 January 3051) era: Clan Invasion	September 1989 (FASA) September 1995 (Roc Books)	ISBN 1-55560-091-3; ISBN 0-451-45383-2	Blood of Kerensky #1. Book one of The Blood of Kerensky Trilogy. A new generation of characters makes its debut in this series. Victor Steiner-Davion, heir to the throne of the Federated Commonwealth, is fresh from the academy and posted to the back end of nowhere. Kai Allard-Liao, son of the great Justin Xiang Allard and Candace Liao, fears he can never live up to the tremendous legacy of his parents. Shin Yodama is a yakuza soldier in the army of the Draconis Combine, assigned to safeguard the grandson of Coordinator Takashi Kurita. Phelan Kell has followed in his father Morgan's footsteps and serves in the mercenary Kell Hounds. All four of these young men must face dangers both internal and external when a mysterious invader from beyond the Periphery threatens everything they know and love.
Blood Legacy	Michael A. Stackpole	c.3052 (31 January 3051 - 17 March 3052) era: Clan Invasion	December 1990 (FASA); November 1995 (Roc Books)	ISBN 1-55560-092-1; ISBN 0-451-45384-0	Blood of Kerensky #2. Book two of The Blood of Kerensky Trilogy. The Clans have been stopped temporarily through the sacrifice of a young pilot. Jaime Wolf, commander of the mysterious and elite Wolf's Dragoons mercenary unit, takes the opportunity to reveal the origin of this new menace: they are the descendants of the Star League Defense Force, which left the Inner Sphere over two hundred years ago after the collapse of the League. The Dragoons, themselves former Clanners, intend to train the heirs of the Successor States to fight and defeat the Clans, if old prejudices and hatreds don't tear the Inner Sphere apart first. The first real test of this new-found sense of cooperation is the defense of Luthien, capital world of the Draconis Combine. But just what is the ultimate objective of the Clans?
Lost Destiny	Michael A. Stackpole	c.3052 (5 January 3052 - 20 June 3052) era: Clan Invasion	September 1991; December 1995	ISBN 1-55560-094-8; ISBN 0-451-45385-9	Blood of Kerensky #3. Book three of The Blood of Kerensky Trilogy. The man once known as Phelan Kell has risen through the ranks in Clan Wolf and now stands to win a coveted Bloodname, the highest honor the Clans can bestow. Kai Allard-Liao is missing and presumed dead in the wake of a Clan Jade Falcon attack. Victor Steiner-Davion must mount a rescue of a man who once would have been considered his mortal enemy: Hohiro Kurita. And behind it all, ComStar lurks, ready to betray their Clan allies for the chance to fulfill their destiny as the saviors of humanity.
Way of the Clans	Robert Thurston	c.3035 (3030's) era: Succession Wars period: Late Succession War - Renaissance	6 August 1991 (Roc Books)	ISBN 0-451-45101-5	Legend of the Jade Phoenix #1. Book one of The Jade Phoenix Trilogy. Cadet Aidan of Clan Jade Falcon dreams of one day being a Warrior and contributing his genetic material to his Clan's breeding program. But first he has to make it out of the sibko, not an easy task when he has to compete against his fellow cadets and endure the scorn of Falconer Joanna.
Bloodname	Robert Thurston	c.3045 (3040's) era: Succession Wars period: Late Succession War - Renaissance	3 October 1991 (Roc Books)	ISBN 0-451-45117-1	Legend of the Jade Phoenix #2. Book two of The Jade Phoenix Trilogy. Aidan is a Warrior, though his path to this role was not one he ever would have imagined. Masquerading as a freeborn named Jorge, he has to hide his true self for fear of his Clan's reaction. When an opportunity to prove his value comes, Aidan leaps to take advantage of the glory he wins and claim his rightful place among the trueborn Warriors of Clan Jade Falcon.
Falcon Guard	Robert Thurston	c.3052 (3051 - 3052) era: Clan Invasion	December 12, 1991 (Roc Books)	ISBN 0-451-45129-5	Legend of the Jade Phoenix #3. Book three of The Jade Phoenix Trilogy. Star Colonel Aidan Pryde has achieved many of the dreams he once had for himself. But the path he took to reach his goals has made him a pariah within the ranks of Clan Jade Falcon, begrudgingly accepted because of the need for as many Warriors as possible to feed the progress of the Clans' invasion of the Inner Sphere. When ComStar challenges the Clans to one final decisive battle on the planet Tukayyid, Aidan gets one last shot at redemption.
Wolf Pack	Robert N. Charrette	c.3055 (3053 - 3055) era: Clan Invasion	April 7, 1992 (Roc Books)	ISBN 0-451-45224-0	Wolf's Dragoons have seen and done it all. With their true identity and purpose revealed during the Clan invasion, they have begun to rebuild both their reputation and their forces. However, an overly-ambitious former Clanner and the insecure scion of Jaime Wolf's own family threaten to undo everything the Dragoons have achieved in their half-century as mercenaries. Jaime Wolf and his Dragoons must decide once and for all if they belong to the Clans or the Inner Sphere... or perhaps are something different from either.
Natural Selection	Michael A. Stackpole	c.3055 (15 February 3054 - 13 November 3055) era: Clan Invasion	July 7, 1992 (Roc Books)	ISBN 0-451-45219-4	Raiders equipped with Clan weaponry are hitting worlds along the Clan Occupation Zone/Federated Commonwealth border. Archon-Prince Designate Victor Steiner-Davion and Khan Phelan Ward of Clan Wolf agree to jointly defeat the raiders despite their differences. Melissa Steiner is assassinated by a bomb blast, adding to the tension of the raids.
Ideal War	Christopher Kubasik	c.3055 (19 May 3054 - 3 March 3055) era: Clan Invasion	March 1993 (Roc Books)	ISBN 0-451-45309-3	Paul Masters is a MechWarrior of House Marik, closely associated with Captain-General Thomas Marik. When Thomas gives him a copy of Le Morte d'Arthur, he becomes part of the newly formed Knights of the Inner Sphere. He is then dispatched to Gibson, where he falls into a political trap between the noble ruler, the rebellious locals, and the Word of Blake, all fighting a Vietnam-like counter insurgency, complete with body counts. The mounting fighting brings in Captain-General Marik, leading him to invade and settle the argument. The rebels bring in nuclear weapons at the climax and Masters is installed as the noble ruler.
Main Event	James D. Long	c.3055 (23 April 3054 - 11 August 3055) era: Clan Invasion	May 1993 (Roc Books)	ISBN 0-451-45245-3	The Black Thorns, a newly minted Mercenary Company, accepts a garrison contract on the backwater world of Borghese after brutal fighting on the world of Galatea. What seems like a normal tour of duty is punctuated by political infighting and a Clan invasion. Will their charismatic leader lead them to victory against the Clans, or will he lose his command again?
Blood of Heroes	Andrew Keith	c.3056 (31 March 3056 - 13 April 3056) era: Clan Invasion	July 1993 (Roc Books)	ISBN 0-451-45259-3	Saga of the Gray Death Legion #4. Melissa Steiner's assassination ignited the fires of civil war, and now secessionist factions clamor for rebellion against the Federated Commonwealth, The rebels' plans hinge on gaining control of the Skye March, and thus controlling the crucial Terran Corridor. Throughout the March, civil and military leaders plot to take up arms against Prince Victor Steiner-Davion. The final piece of the plan requires the secessionist forces to gain access to the planet Glengarry and the mercenary group that calls it home: the Gray Death Legion.
Far Country	Peter Rice	c.3056 (9 November 2510 - November 3056) era: Clan Invasion	October 1993 (Roc Books)	ISBN 0-451-45337-9	A DEST (Draconis Elite Strike Team) group, accompanied by a small mercenary group, make a misjump from Kurita space and land on a planet inhabited by 500-year-old colonists and a mysterious alien lifeform. Amidst their battles to survive and return to the inner sphere, they form a bond with highly intelligent birds who see them as the fulfillment of their own prophecy.
Assumption of Risk	Michael A. Stackpole	c.3055 (19 December 3055) era: Clan Invasion	September 1993 (Roc Books)	ISBN 0-451-45283-6	Kai Allard-Liao has returned to the world that made his father famous, the gaming planet of Solaris VII. But being the Gaming World's Champion is the least of his worries as conflicts abound, from the arrival of a former lover to the assassination plot of a political leader.
D.R.T.	James D. Long	c.3057 (1 October 3056 - 6 November 3057) era: Clan Invasion	May 1994 (Roc Books)	ISBN 0-451-45364-6	The Black Thorns, fresh from their victory at Borghese (but lacking funds) take a high-profile contract on the world of Wolcott, a Draconis Combine world deep within the holdings of Clan Nova Cat and Clan Smoke Jaguar. Prompted by their fiscal desperation, they take on a risky contract that will lead them deep into the Clans. Can they make it out alive, or will they be swallowed by a superior Clan force?
Close Quarters	Victor Milán	c.3056 (6 May 3034 - 2 November 3056) era: Clan Invasion	September 1994 (Roc Books)	ISBN 0-451-45378-6	Camacho's Caballeros #1. First of the Camacho's Caballeros novels. Hired to provide protection for Chandrasekhar Kurita's business holdings on Hachiman, Camacho's Cablleros and Cassie Suthorn begin to feel out a plot to take down the high-ranking noble. When an alliance between his foes threatens Chandrasekhar's interests, Cassie and the Caballeros face a tough battle between their friends in the Ninth Ghost Regiment and Ninyu Kerai Indrahar, the spymaster manipulating the whole conflict.
Bred for War	Michael A. Stackpole	c.3058 (20 May 3057 - 1 January 3058) era: Clan Invasion	January 1995 (Roc Books)	ISBN 0-451-45379-4	Covers the origins and the fighting of the Refusal War fought between Clan Wolf and Clan Jade Falcon in 3057. Also covers that forming of the Lyran Alliance and the brief war between the Capellan Confederation, Free Worlds League, and the Federated Commonwealth.
I Am Jade Falcon	Robert Thurston	c.3057 (1 July 3057 - 31 December 3057) era: Clan Invasion	May 1995 (Roc Books)	ISBN 0-451-45380-8	Star Commander Joanna and Khan Natasha Kerensky face off on the planet Twycross during the Refusal War between the Jade Falcons and the Wolves. For Natasha Kerensky, it is an opportunity to bog down the Falcons while elements of the Wolves flee to the Inner Sphere. For Joanna, it may be her last opportunity to die in battle before being transferred back to the clan homeworlds.
Highlander Gambit	Blaine Lee Pardoe	c.3058 (8 August 3057-1 January 3058 | 21 December 3028 prologue) era: Clan Invasion	June 1995 (Roc Books)	ISBN 0-451-45381-6	During the Fourth Succession War, the famed Northwind Highlanders were granted their homeworld by the Federated Suns in return for breaking ties with their employer, the Capellan Confederation. Now thirty years later, an elite Death Commando and descendant of a Highlander is ordered by his ruler to sacrifice everything he is and everything he has to destroy the bonds between the Federated Commonwealth and the Highlanders, even if it means the Highlanders' destruction.
Tactics of Duty	William H. Keith Jr.	c.3057 (17 April 3056 - 21 April 3057) era: Clan Invasion	August 1995 (Roc Books)	ISBN 0-451-45490-1	Saga of the Gray Death Legion #5. Alexander Carlyle, the son of Lori Kalmar and Grayson Death Carlyle, and Davis McCall, a veteran legionnaire and native Caledonian, unexpectedly find themselves key players in a popular revolt on Caledonia against a cruel and despised Davion-backed governor. When the Gray Death Legion is called upon to put down this very rebellion, they all find themselves pawns in a deadly game of manipulation and betrayal.
Star Lord	Donald G. Phillips	c.3057 (1 April 3057 - 30 August 3057 | 22 February 2774 prologue) era: Clan Invasion	February 1996 (Roc Books)	ISBN 0-451-45386-7	An heir to the Usurper Stefan Amaris appears deep in the periphery, and it is up to a crack team of Free Worlds League troops to infiltrate his operation and assassinate the would-be Star Lord.
Malicious Intent	Michael A. Stackpole	c.3058 (11 December 3057 - 17 June 3058) era: Clan Invasion	March 1996 (Roc Books)	ISBN 0-451-45531-2	Set right after the refusal war between Clan Jade Falcon and Clan Wolf, this novel focuses on Clan Jade Falcon's attack on Coventry, which has the unintended side effect of uniting disparate elements of the Inner Sphere. Vlad of Clan Wolf attempts to rebuild his clan with political intrigue. Time Period covered - December 3057 to June 3058 James Swallow reviewed Malicious Intent for Arcane magazine, rating it a 7 out of 10 overall. Swallow comments that "It seems Stackpole had a list of all the important political happenings in 3058 and has shoe-horned them all into this book. What you get is a ringside seat at the return from the dead of the Wolf Clan, the Jade Falcon Clan's invasion toward Tharkad, ComStar's loss of Terra, the start of a grand House-wide alliance, and some interesting hints about future events, including a Clan/House pact cemented by lust and mutual interest. Epic."
Hearts of Chaos	Victor Milán	c.3058 (24 December 3056 - 23 April 3058) era: Clan Invasion	June 1996 (Roc Books)	ISBN 0-451-45523-1	Camacho's Caballeros #2. Camacho's Caballeros are sent to the planet Towne, where hints of a plot against the Combine continue to surface. Once there, they find the planet split between support for the local Davionists, and the desire for stability among the Draconis Combine. Behind the Combine troops, however, lie the Kokoryu-Kai, a mysterious organization that wants to overthrow the Coordinator of the Combine.
Operation Excalibur	William H. Keith Jr.	c.3058 (26 April 3057 - 3 January 3058) era: Clan Invasion	August 1996 (Roc Books)	ISBN 0-451-45534-7	Saga of the Gray Death Legion #6. The Gray Death Legion detaches themselves from the planet Glengarry, and takes service with their erstwhile enemy, the rebellious governor of Hesperus. Under the guise of turncoats, they play a dangerous game of brinkmanship that culminates in a battle among the 'Mech factory itself. Can they bring Hesperus back into the Lyran Alliance, or will they destroy the factory they swore to protect?
Black Dragon	Victor Milán	c.3058 (18 June 3058 - 1 July 3058 | 10 June 3058 prologue) era: Clan Invasion	November 1996 (Roc Books)	ISBN 0-451-45528-2	Camacho's Caballeros #3. On the Coordinator's Birthday, Camacho's Caballeros are invited to Luthien to be honored for their work on the planet Towne. However, while they wait for their honors, Cassie Suthorn begins to unravel a plot to kill the coordinator. With Ninyu Kerai Indrahar's help, she finds the Kuroyu-kai plotting a nefarious scheme to kill the Coordinator with his own bodyguards. If they interfere, the Caballeros could be branded murderers, but if they don't, the future of the Combine could be in jeopardy.
Impetus of War	Blaine Lee Pardoe	c.3058 (1 May 3058 - 9 September 3058 | 30 April 3058 prologue) era: Clan Invasion	December 1996 (Roc Books)	ISBN 0-451-45529-0	The Draconis Combine hires out the famous Northwind Highlanders for a daring mission into clan space. 'Cat' Stirling and Loren Jaffrey take the Stirling Fusiliers to the planet of Wayside V deep behind clan lines for a strike on the Smoke Jaguar's supply lines.
Double-Blind	Loren L. Coleman	c.3058 (17 March 3058 - 27 August 3058 | 15 October 3057 prologue) era: Clan Invasion	April 1997 (Roc Books)	ISBN 0-451-45597-5	Avanti's Angels #1. Using fast and furious hit-and-run tactics, Marcus GioAvanti and mercenaries have earned a tough reputation throughout the Inner Sphere. But the Inner Sphere isn't where their newest job is taking them—because their latest employer resides in that remote and mysterious region of space known as the Periphery. Marcus and his Angels will have to face the real force behind the hostilities—the religious cult known as Word of Blake.
Binding Force	Loren L. Coleman	c.3058 (24 April 3047 - 9 August 3058 | 21 February 3058 prologue) era: Clan Invasion	July 1997 (Roc Books)	ISBN 0-451-45604-1	February 3058 - The year of the Horse. The Capellan Confederation is trying to "pacify" the Chaos March - starting with the Sarna Supremacy. House Hiritsu is assigned to take Sarna, but the House Master is assassinated at the time they arrive into the system. Aris Sung - a young mechwarrior - fights his way through the campaign, trying to find the killer of the House Master, survive the war - and prove that the will of the House Master is the will of the House.
Exodus Road	Blaine Lee Pardoe	c.3058 (2 May 3052 - 15 November 3058 | 3 October 3037 prologue) era: Clan Invasion	August 1997 (Roc Books)	ISBN 0-451-45612-2	Twilight of the Clans #1. Book one of The Twilight of the Clans series. The Smoke Jaguars are one of the most powerful Clans, yet are the most savage and demanding on their people. When one mechwarrior Trent feels that his clan has betrayed him, a captured ComStar agent convinces him to travel the Exodus road not once, but twice, and returns with a prize worthy of the Inner Sphere: Huntress, the Capitol of Clan Smoke Jaguar!.
Grave Covenant	Michael A. Stackpole	c.3059 (30 September 3058 - 1 September 3059) era: Clan Invasion	September 1997 (Roc Books)	ISBN 0-451-45613-0	Twilight of the Clans #2. Book two of The Twilight of the Clans series. The states of the Inner Sphere have reformed the Star League, and begin the campaign to destroy Clan Smoke Jaguar, while the Clans plan to continue the invasion. Within the clans, however, warden and crusader tensions may doom a resumption before it starts. Can Lincoln Osis lead the Smoke Jaguars to victory, or will they be annihilated, tooth and claw?
The Hunters	Thomas S. Gressman	c.3060 (12 August 3058 - 3 January 3060) era: Clan Invasion	December 1997 (Roc Books)	ISBN 0-451-45624-6	Twilight of the Clans #3. Book three of The Twilight of the Clans series. Task Force Serpent has the Eridani Light Horse, MacLeod's Regiment of the Northwind Highlanders, 1st Kathil Ulhans, 11th Lyran Guards, ComGuards, Kingston's Rangers, 1st Knights of the Inner Sphere, and two Special Forces teams. Not to mention its WarShips, and Space Craft. All commanded by Marshal of the Armies Morgan Hasek-Davion. Its mission is to reduce Huntress, homeworld of Clan Smoke Jaguar, to an agrarian planet. But how can these once-rival forces combine, and are their enemies lurking amongst them?
Freebirth	Robert Thurston	c.3059 (18 June 3058 - 9 May 3059) era: Clan Invasion	February 1998 (Roc Books)	ISBN 0-451-45665-3	Twilight of the Clans #4. Book four of The Twilight of the Clans series. Mechwarrior Diana is sponsored for an attempt to earn the Pryde bloodname, and Star Captain Joanna is assigned as her trainer, leaving them both bound for Ironhold. Meanwhile, Horse, now also a Star Captain, is dispatched to the Clan Jade Falcon outpost of Falcon's Eyrie on the Smoke Jaguar homeworld of Huntress, on a special mission for Khan Martha Pryde. When there, he finds secret research by the scientist caste, and must fight to restore their clan's honor. Little do they know that soon after they leave, a far greater force will arrive on Huntress...
Sword and Fire	Thomas S. Gressman	c.3060 (3 January 3060 - 13 March 3060) era: Clan Invasion	August 1998 (Roc Books)	ISBN 0-451-45676-9	Twilight of the Clans #5. Book five of The Twilight of the Clans series. Huntress, capitol of the Smoke Jaguars. After the death of Marshall Morgan Hasek-Davion, Ariana Winston, the General in charge of the Eridani Light Horse, is chosen to lead Task Force Serpent. As they wind their way among the stars, they finally reach their goal and begin the pacification. However, a new wave of Jaguars is on its way from the Inner Sphere, pushed out by Victor Steiner-Davion's Operation Bulldog. Can they survive this new influx of clan troops, or has their task been doomed all along?
Shadows of War	Thomas S. Gressman	c.3060 (13 March 3060 - 9 April 3060) era: Clan Invasion	September 1998 (Roc Books)	ISBN 0-451-45707-2	Twilight of the Clans #6. Book six of The Twilight of the Clans series. Morgan Hasek-Davion is dead. Arianna Winston is leading a desperate defensive on Huntress while enraged Clan Smoke Jaguar troops flood the field. As the Serpent forces lose more and more men, death seems certain. But in the knick of time, Operation Bulldog arrives and eradicates the last of the Smoking Jaguars. But in the wake of their victory, Victor Steiner-Davion reveals the true goal of their fight: Strana Mechty, the homeworlds of the Clans, itself!
Prince of Havoc	Michael A. Stackpole	c.3061 (9 April 3060 - 15 December 3061) era: Clan Invasion	December 1998 (Roc Books)	ISBN 0-451-45706-4	Twilight of the Clans #7. Book seven of The Twilight of the Clans series. Victor Steiner-Davion leads his battered, but victorious forces to Strana Mechty, and begins the bidding process for the Clan invasion itself. The Inner Sphere mechwarriors fight for honor, for hope, and for their lives, and in the end emerge victorious. But Clan Wolf Khan Vlad Ward lets off a parting shot as the coalition forces leave his homeworld: the Inner Sphere may not be as stable as when they left.
Falcon Rising	Robert Thurston	c.3061 (31 December 3059 - 18 April 3062 | 29 December 3059 prologue) era: Clan Invasion	March 1999 (Roc Books)	ISBN 0-451-45738-2	Twilight of the Clans #8. Book eight of The Twilight of the Clans series. After the Great Refusal, Khan Marthe Pryde of Clan Jade Falcon decides to sharpen the Clan's talons in the Inner Sphere, and allows Freeborn Mechwarrior Diana, daughter of Aidan Pryde, to compete for a bloodname.
Threads of Ambition	Loren L. Coleman	c.3061 (25 June 3060 - 1 July 3061 | 3 March 3060 prologue) era: Clan Invasion	May 1999 (Roc Books)	ISBN 0-451-45745-5	The Capellan Solution #1. Book one of The Capellan Solution. Isis Marik, fiancé of Sun-Tzu Liao, is attacked in Capellan Space by a rogue St. Ives Compact unit. This gives Sun-Tzu the excuse he has been waiting for to go to war with the Compact. Despite their small numbers, the Compact forces put up the fight of their lives to maintain their freedom.
The Killing Fields	Loren L. Coleman	c.3062 (25 February 3062 - 2 October 3062 | 21 February 3062 prologue) era: Civil War	August 1999 (Roc Books)	ISBN 0-451-45753-6	The Capellan Solution #2. Book two of The Capellan Solution. Sun-Tzu Liao's "Xin Sheng" movement has picked up momentum with the occupation of many St. Ives Compact worlds, but as the fighting continues into a bloodier conflict both sides are left to wonder what they are fighting for.
Ghost of Winter	Stephen Kenson	c.3060 (11 April 3060 - 2 May 3060) era: Clan Invasion	October 1999 (Roc Books)	ISBN 0-451-45760-9	A MechWarrior series novel - Set on a snowy backwater planet where raiders have discovered that a cache of Clan second line mechs remains hidden. The nearly non-existent militia must not only find it first, but then figure out of a way to get the raiders off their planet.
Roar of Honor	Blaine Lee Pardoe	c.3062 (2 January 3062 - 25 June 3062 | 14 February 3059 prologue) era: Civil War	October 1999 (Roc Books)	ISBN 0-451-45761-7	A MechWarrior series novel about a conflict between Clan Ghost Bear and Clan Wolf.
By Blood Betrayed	Blaine Lee Pardoe, Mel Odom	c.3059 (15 January 3059 - 5 August 3059) era: Clan Invasion	November 1999 (Roc Books)	ISBN 0-451-45766-8	A MechWarrior series book focusing around a backwater planet in the Rim Collection and a young MechWarrior's quest to find his brother's betrayer.
Dagger Point	Thomas S. Gressman	c.3062 (15 July 3061 – 22 March 3062) era: Civil War	April 2000 (Roc Books)	ISBN 0-451-45783-8	SLDF's Eridani Light Horse has been dispatched to St. Ives Compact on a peacekeeping mission only to find a world where its people have turned completely hostile towards them.
Illusions of Victory	Loren L. Coleman	c.3062 (10 August 3062 – 31 August 3062 | 21 September 3059 prologue) era: Civil War	May 2000 (Roc Books)	ISBN 0-451-45790-0	A novel of the FedCom Civil War centering around a Solaris VII fighter. Time Period covered - 10 August 3062 to 31 August 3062 (Prelude is September 3059)
Measure of a Hero	Blaine Lee Pardoe	c.3063 (23 October 3062 – 9 February 3063 | 8 April 3060 prologue) era: Civil War	July 2000 (Roc Books)	ISBN 0-451-45794-3	Archer Christifori #1. Concerns the FedCom Civil War.
Path of Glory	Randall N. Bills	c.3062 (12 June 3061 – 20 December 3062 | 13 May 3060 prologue) era: Civil War	December 2000 (Roc Books)	ISBN 0-451-45807-9	A novel about an alliance between Clan Nova Cat and the Draconis Combine at the beginning of the FedCom Civil War.
Flashpoint	Loren L. Coleman	c.3062 (8 October 3062 – 10 December 3062 | 28 March 3060 prologue) era: Civil War	April 2001 (Roc Books)	ISBN 0-451-45824-9	A novel of the FedCom Civil War. Time Period covered - 8 October 3062 to 10 December 3062 (Prelude is March 3060)
Test of Vengeance	Bryan Nystul	c.3064 (19 October 3062 – 12 August 3064 | 5 December 3061 prologue) era: Civil War	June 2001 (Roc Books)	ISBN 0-451-45836-2	A book centering around Clan Ghost Bear and an elemental's attempt to rise in rank within the clan.
Patriots and Tyrants	Loren L. Coleman	c.3063 (25 December 3061 – 20 December 3063) era: Civil War	September 2001 (Roc Books)	ISBN 0-451-45845-1	The Federated Commonwealth & Lyran Alliance begin to collide into beginnings of what will become the FedCom Civil War. Victor Steiner-Davion can no longer ignore the troubles in his former realm.
Call of Duty	Blaine Lee Pardoe	c.3063 (11 February 3063 – 10 May 3063 | 3 February 3063 prologue) era: Civil War	October 2001 (Roc Books)	ISBN 0-451-45856-7	Archer Christifori #2. A novel of the FedCom Civil War. Where Archer and his Avengers must confront legendary mercenary unit, Snord's Irregulars, and convince them to join Victor's army on eve of their contract expiring.
Initiation to War	Robert N. Charrette	c.3062 (26 November 3061 – 6 May 3062) era: Civil War	November 2001 (Roc Books)	ISBN 0-451-45851-6	A MechWarrior series novel - Epsilon Eridani is being raided by pirates. The federated government is helpless to aide. Now, the local counties governments call for volunteers to man Battalion of Battlemechs to fend off the enemy. However, who really is the enemy?
The Dying Time	Thomas S. Gressman	c.3065 (22 May 3065 – 25 August 3065 | 16 April 3065 prologue) era: Civil War	January 2002 (Roc Books)	ISBN 0-451-45866-4	Saga of the Gray Death Legion #7. A MechWarrior series novel - Grayson Death Carlyle was the young son of the commander of Carlyle's Commandos, a mercenary unit employed by the Lyran Commonwealth. Now he goes on his death bed, after years of radiation and unimaginable wounds from the Mech cockpit. His wife takes up the reins as the Death Legion embark on their greatest challenge since their birth. The Gray Death Legion return to Hesperus but this time to protect the facility during the raveges of the FedCom Civil War, once Sky Separatist launch a major assault, their survival, even as Katharine’s most beloved merc unit comes into question.
Imminent Crisis	Randall N. Bills	c.3066 (27 April 3065 – 29 May 3066 | 4 November 3064 prologue) era: Civil War	March 2002 (Roc Books)	ISBN 0-451-45872-9	A MechWarrior series novel - A novel of the FedCom Civil War set around the Capellan March capital and its internal struggles. Duke Haesk directs his 8th Syrtis Fusiliers & its allied forces attempt to fight off regiments of Katrina Steiner-Davion's FedCom loyalist army from taking over Syrtis.
Storms of Fate	Loren L. Coleman	c.3065 (6 March 3064 – 8 April 3065) era: Civil War	April 2, 2002 (Roc Books)	ISBN 0-451-45876-1	First Prince Victor Steiner-Davion, continues his campaign to win the FedCom Civil War and fight Katrina (Katherine) Steiner-Davion's loyalist troops.
Operation Audacity	Blaine Lee Pardoe	c.3065 (15 June 3064 – 15 March 3065 | 23 May 3064 prologue) era: Civil War	June 4, 2002 (Roc Books)	ISBN 0-451-45885-0	Archer Christifori #3. During the FedCom Civil War, Clan Jade Falcon attacks and seizes planets in the Lyran Alliance. Prince Victor Steiner-Davion sends Major General Archer Christifori to check the Clan advance by taking Clan worlds behind those recently captured.
Endgame	Loren L. Coleman	c.3067 (26 June 3065 – 26 August 3067) era: Civil War	September 3, 2002 (Roc Books)	ISBN 0-451-45893-1	Prince Victor Steiner-Davion and his allies attempt to crush the Loyalists under Victor's sister, Katrina and bring an end to the FedCom Civil War.
The Legend of the Jade Phoenix Trilogy	Robert Thurston	c.3052 (3030's - 3052) era: Clan Invasion	October 7, 2003 (Roc Books)	ISBN 0-451-45951-2	Legend of the Jade Phoenix #1-3. An omnibus reprint of Way of the Clans, Bloodname and Falcon Guard.

== MechWarrior: Dark Age novels 2002-2009 ==
Novels originally categorized as "MechWarrior: Dark Age": The original "Dark Age" novels released by Roc Books & A Bonfire of Worlds by Catalyst Game Labs. The following novels occur during the "Dark Age" era of the early to mid 32nd century.

Title	Author	Chronology	Published	ISBN	Synopsis
Ghost War	Michael A. Stackpole	c.3133 (13 November 3132 – 2 March 3133) era: Dark Age	December 3, 2002 (Roc Books)	ISBN 0-451-45905-9	Sam Donnelly investigates a terrorist organization on the planets Helen and Basalt. Time Period covered - 12 November 3132 to 2 March 3133
A Call to Arms	Loren L. Coleman	c.3133 (11 February 3133 – 19 March 3133 | 26 October 3130 prologue) era: Dark Age	February 4, 2003 (Roc Books)	ISBN 0-451-45912-1	Customs officer Raul Ortega must deal with a Steel Wolf attack on the planet Achernar, one of the few worlds with a working HPG station.
The Ruins of Power	Robert Vardeman	c.3133 (3 April 3133 – 12 May 3133) era: Dark Age	April 1, 2003 (Roc Books)	ISBN 0-451-45928-8	War comes to Mirach, and the pacifistic governor wants none of it. His son Austin must take up the sword instead.
A Silence in the Heavens	Martin Delrio	c.3133 (24 November 3132 - 29 June 3133) era: Dark Age	June 3, 2003 (Roc Books)	ISBN 0-451-45932-6	Proving Grounds #1. Book One of The Proving Grounds Trilogy. The Steel Wolves, led by Anastasia Kerensky, assault Northwind. They are opposed by Tara Campbell and her Highlanders, as well as Paladin Ezekiel Crow.
Truth and Shadows	Martin Delrio	c.3134 (November 3133 – February 3134) era: Dark Age	August 5, 2003 (Roc Books)	ISBN 0-451-45938-5	Proving Grounds #2. Book Two of The Proving Grounds Trilogy. While Tara Campbell and Ezekiel Crow grow closer, Anastasia Kerensky makes another attempt on Northwind. Meanwhile, a dark secret threatens to unravel the alliance against the Steel Wolves.
Service for the Dead	Martin Delrio	c.3134 (February 3134 – May 3134) era: Dark Age	November 4, 2003 (Roc Books)	ISBN 0-451-45943-1	Proving Grounds #3. Book Three of The Proving Grounds Trilogy. Anastasia Kerensky leads her Steel Wolves to Terra, the capital of the Republic of the Sphere. Tara Campbell not only must stop the Wolf leader, but also confront a traitor closer to home.
By Temptations and By War	Loren L. Coleman	c.3134 (8 March 3134 – 23 September 3134 | 11 August 3132 prologue) era: Dark Age	December 2, 2003 (Roc Books)	ISBN 0-451-45947-4	The planet Liao holds special significance to the Capellan Confederation and its ruling House Liao. Chancellor Daoshen Liao sends an agent to regain the planet from the Republic and resurrect a long-dead Warrior House. The mystery of the Betrayer of Liao is resolved.
Fortress of Lies	J. Steven York	c.3134 (1 September 3134 – 25 December 3134) era: Dark Age	February 3, 2004 (Roc Books)	ISBN 0-451-45963-6	Duke Aaron Sandoval uses his nephew Erik to make alliances and oppose the Capellan advance into the Republic.
Patriot's Stand	Mike Moscoe	c.3134 (3 April 3134 - 2 September 3134) era: Dark Age	April 6, 2004 (Roc Books)	ISBN 0-451-45970-9	When an unscrupulous businessman hires Hansen's Roughriders to help him conquer the planet Alkalurops, the determined natives must put their fate in the hands of a rag-tag group of mercenaries.
Flight of the Falcon	Victor Milán	c.3134 (4 March 3134 - 21 August 3134) era: Dark Age	June 1, 2004 (Roc Books)	ISBN 0-451-45983-0	Clan Jade Falcon enters the fray as the Hazen sibkin, Malvina and Alex, lead an incursion into the Republic. Their target: Skye.
Blood of the Isle	Loren L. Coleman	c.3135 (8 September 3134 – 5 January 3135) era: Dark Age	August 3, 2004 (Roc Books)	ISBN 0-451-45988-1	An unlikely alliance has arisen between the loyal Highlanders, the secessionist Stormhammers and the predatory Steel Wolves to protect the planet Skye against Clan Jade Falcon.
Hunters of the Deep	Randall N. Bills	c.3134 (19 June 3134 – 1 November 3134) era: Dark Age	October 5, 2004 (Roc Books)	ISBN 0-451-46005-7	Clan Sea Fox roams the spacelanes like interstellar Gypsies, buying and selling at every world and living almost entirely on their enormous ArcShips and CargoShips. In the midst of his regular duties, ovKhan Petr Kalasa of Delta Aimag uncovers intrigue among his fellow merchants.
The Scorpion Jar	Jason M. Hardy	c.3135 (1 October 3134 – 2 January 3135) era: Dark Age	December 7, 2004 (Roc Books)	ISBN 0-451-46020-0	The death of a legendary hero triggers further crisis in the Republic of the Sphere. With all of his fellow Paladins gathered on Terra to elect a new Exarch, Jonah Levin investigates the mystery behind this tragic murder and uncovers a conspiracy that could bring the Republic to the brink of destruction.
Target of Opportunity	Blaine Lee Pardoe	c.3135 (26 January 3135 - 23 August 3135) era: Dark Age	February 1, 2005 (Roc Books)	ISBN 0-451-46016-2	ComStar once ruled the realm of interstellar communications throughout the Inner Sphere. Then came the Jihad, launched by a fanatical splinter group. The organization rebuilt, but the crash of the Hyperpulse Generator net nearly three years ago may just be the fatal blow for ComStar. One young Adept thinks he may have the answer to restoring communications, but will he be allowed to test his theory or will he become the pawn of warring factions?
Sword of Sedition	Loren L. Coleman	c.3135 (17 December 3134 – 2 June 3135) era: Dark Age	April 5, 2005 (Roc Books)	ISBN 0-451-46022-7	Book One of the Republic in Flames duology. Strife continues to build in the Republic government and the new Exarch struggles to repair the damage. With dignitaries from across human space arriving to honor a fallen hero, Terra becomes a pressure cooker that may just explode and bring devastation to everyone.
Daughter of the Dragon	Ilsa J. Bick	c.3136 (14 February 3134 – 15 February 3136) era: Dark Age	June 7, 2005 (Roc Books)	ISBN 0-451-46034-0	Katana Tormark was once a powerful figure in the Republic until the crash of the HPG system brought out her true allegiance. Now she conquers in the name of the Draconis Combine. But does Coordinator Vincent Kurita support or despise her?
Heretic's Faith	Randall N. Bills	c.3137 (5 November 3135 – 9 February 3137) era: Dark Age	August 2, 2005 (Roc Books)	ISBN 0-451-46040-5	Clan Nova Cat is known for following their mystical visions, even when the path appears strange to outsiders. Led by the visions of the Mystic Caste, the Nova Cats take up an offer of alliance extended to them by Katana Tormark, now Warlord of Dieron. Will they take the opportunity to reconnect with their sundered brethren in the Republic? Or destroy them?
Fortress Republic	Loren L. Coleman	c.3135 (9 June 3135 - 12 October 3135) era: Dark Age	October 4, 2005 (Roc Books)	ISBN 0-451-46053-7	Book Two of the Republic in Flames duology. With more and more threats appearing on his doorstep, Exarch Jonah Levin has a tough decision to make. Will his attempts to save the Republic doom it instead? Meanwhile, Julian Davion, stripped of his position as Prince's Champion, leads a multinational force against the Senatorial rebellion and Caleb Davion assumes control of the Federated Suns.
Blood Avatar	Ilsa J. Bick	c.3136 (13 – 21 April 3136 | 9 December 3135 prologue) era: Dark Age	December 6, 2005 (Roc Books)	ISBN 0-451-46074-X	The first body that turns up in Farway, a secluded town on the planet Denebola, is from out of town. When the Denebola Bureau of Investigation and the legate’s office from half the planet away decide to help identify the murder victim, Sheriff Hank Ketchum knows he’s in over his head. Enter the infamous Detective Jack Ramsey. With the help of the talented and beautiful local medical examiner, Amanda Slade, Ramsey digs into the case and discovers evidence that puts Farway at the heart of a conspiracy.
Trial by Chaos	J. Steven York	c.3136 (21 November 3136 - 27 December 3136) era: Dark Age	June 6, 2006 (Roc Books)	ISBN 0-451-46072-3	(3136 A.D.) - The Rasalhague Dominion has disbatched its Omega Galaxy to planet Vega in former Prefecture I, trying to bring stability back to the region of former Republic of the Sphere. However, the planet's civilian population is in chaos. With threats of invasion from Draconis Combine and on planet terrorist, Ghost Bear warriors face forces from outworld and within their very clan may make them fail this trial.
Principles of Desolation	Jason M. Hardy	c.3137 (9 May 3135 – 1 March 3137) era: Dark Age	August 1, 2006 (Roc Books)	ISBN 0-451-46081-2	Raised among royalty in the Magistracy of Canopus, where the superiority of women is a cultural axiom, Danai Liao-Centrella possesses all the confidence necessary for her to ascend through the Confederacy ranks, despite having to contend with the constant machinations of her maniacal brother, Daoshen. But when her latest mission ends in defeat and personal disgrace, Danai will face the greatest challenge of her life. Chancellor Daoshen rewards her failure by giving her a battalion of her own and a brand-new battlefield. And Danai is about to learn that in service to the state, even family comes second to safeguarding the Capellan Confederation.
Wolf Hunters	Kevin Killiany	c.3136 (27 May 3135 – 22 October 3136) era: Dark Age	November 7, 2006 (Roc Books)	ISBN 0-451-46095-2	Anastasia Kerensky has declared the Steel Wolf Clan to be mercenaries, re-christening them Wolf Hunters. The combination of autonomy and wealth will make them more than a match for any MechWarrior battalion suicidal enough to challenge them. But the real challenge comes from within the Clan. Star Colonel Varnoff believes Kerensky has betrayed them all-and with a loyal faction of Steel Wolves at his side vows to destroy all the Wolf Hunters.
Surrender Your Dreams	Blaine Lee Pardoe	c.3138 (27 March 3135 – 31 March 3138) era: Dark Age	December 5, 2006 (Roc Books)	ISBN 0-451-46120-7	(3135-3136, & Beyond) - A Group of Knights, Ghost Knights & Paladin Redmond team up with Stone's hidden allies to ensure the future of the Republic of the Sphere.
Dragon Rising	Ilsa J. Bick	c.3137 (15 March 3136 – 15 May 3137) era: Dark Age	February 6, 2007 (Roc Books)	ISBN 978-0-451-46141-4	Sequel to Daughter of the Dragon.
Masters of War	Michael Stackpole	c.3137 (22 October 3136 – 20 March 3137) era: Dark Age	April 3, 2007 (Roc Books)	ISBN 978-0-451-46137-7	Former Republic of the Sphere falls prey to a new incursion. Clan Wolf has awaken to the desires to conqueror Terra. The Wolf Hunters and other forces have been called to former Prefecture 9 unite to fight them off the invasion. (October 3136 to May 3137)
A Rending of Falcons	Victor Milán	c.3136 (3 August 3135 – 4 April 3136) era: Dark Age	June 5, 2007 (Roc Books)	ISBN 978-0-451-46159-9	Galaxy Commander Malvina Hazen, one of CJF's expeditary commanders has returned to Occupational Zone to confront her Khan for leadership of the Clan. The war changes the direction of the Falcons forever. This is the Sequel to both Flight of the Falcon & "Blood of the Isle". (Sept. 3135 to April 3136) Clan Jade Falcon Civil War
Pandora's Gambit	Randall N. Bills	c.3137 (4 February 3135 – 20 August 3137 | 2 January 3135 prologue) era: Dark Age	August 7, 2007 (Roc Books)	ISBN 978-0451461650	Captain-General Jessica Marik's Oriente Protectorate begins its gambit of re-uniting the House Marik. However, the others elements of the old League are in motion with their own plans.
Fire at Will	Blaine Pardoe	c.3138 (15 January 3137 – 30 March 3138 | 10 November 3136 prologue) era: Dark Age	October 2, 2007 (Roc Books)	ISBN 978-0451461780	Archon Melissa Steiner has order invasion of FWL to prevent its reunification. Trillian Steiner(-Davion) attempts to guide this campaign, pushing her loyalty and skills to the test for her Great House.
The Last Charge	Jason M. Hardy	c.3138 (13 February 3138 - 13 June 3138) era: Dark Age	December 4, 2007 (Roc Books)	ISBN 0-451-46183-5 | ISBN 978-0-451-46183-4	Anson Marik is at his wits end. The Lyrans are pressing on his borders, his chief tactician has resigned, and his abilities as a leader are failing him. Now his enemies are on the move, taking the Marik-Steward Commonwealth planet by planet. If Marik cannot gather his strength to stop the invasion, his people will be doomed. Steiner Invasion of FWL Space (3136-3138)
To Ride the Chimera	Kevin Killiany	c.3139 (23 August 3137 – 3 July 3139) era: Dark Age	February 5, 2008 (Roc Books)	ISBN 0-451-46194-0 | ISBN 978-0-451-46194-0	Thaddeus Marik has become the figurehead for a new community of worlds attempting to resurrect the Free Worlds League. After defeating a Lyran invasion on the planet of Savannah and negotiating a successful alliance with the Protectorate Coalition, Marik must now ally himself with Jessica Halas-Hughes Marik if the new league is to have a chance. Having Marik and his forces at her side gives Jessica much-needed credibility and greater influence on Oriente. But old hatreds die hard, erupting in a war against enemies who will stop at nothing to destroy the founding of a new league...
A Bonfire of Worlds	Steven Mohan Jr.	c.3143 (25 April 3139 – 14 September 3143 | 18 August 3136 prologue) era: Dark Age	October 15, 2009 (Catalyst Game Labs)	ISBN 1934857246 | ISBN 978-1934857243	The failure of interstellar communications threatens civilization across the breadth of the Inner Sphere. ComStar kidnaps engineering genius Tucker Harwell who unravels the Blackout’s greatest mystery. Khan Malvina Hazen of the Jade Falcons hunts for the next enemy to crush beneath her brutal Mongol Doctrine, and the warrior Alaric Wolf makes his move into the halls of power. Secrets hidden for decades will finally be revealed, while an empire goes up in flames. Note: This book was released for print in 2019.

== BattleTech novels 2013-present ==
Books categorized by Catalyst Game Labs as "novels" (not including anthologies, novellas, short stories, or magazines) released 2013 and later.

Title	Author	Chronology	Published	ISBN	Synopsis
Isle of the Blessed	Steven Mohan Jr.	c.3073 era: Jihad	October 1, 2013 (Catalyst Game Labs) 5 August 2006 – 16 February 2007 (BattleCorps)		
Embers of War	Jason Schmetzer	c.3067 (22 December 3066 - 19 October 3067) era: Civil War	July 30, 2015 (Catalyst Game Labs)	ISBN 978-1-942487-23-4	The first new Classic Battletech novel in 13 years after the release of Endgame. The book centers around the mercenary company known as the Stealthy Tigers in game year 3067. The novel focus on world of Hall which the Stealthy Tigers were contracted to end civil war accruing on the planet. The mercenary company finds itself now waiting for their contract to end when they faced with crisis challenges their very fibers that makes it who they are: Professional Mercenaries.
Betrayal of Ideals	Blaine Lee Pardoe	c.3041 (5 July 2821 - 25 May 3041) era: Succession Wars period: Late Succession War - Renaissance	August 5, 2016 (Catalyst Game Labs) January 16, 2007 (BattleCorps)	ISBN 978-1-942487-5-79	Set during the early 2800s, the story centers around the descendants of the Star League Self-Defense Force, the Clans. One had committed crimes so terrible that its very name is shunned and only referred Not-Named Clan. Known as Clan Wolverine, the story centers to the truth of what cause them to become forcefully erased from the Clan's histories and only as chief betrayer of Clan Society.
The Nellus Academy Incident	Jennifer Brozek	c.3067 (16-27 October 3067) era: Civil War	March 4, 2018 (Catalyst Game Labs)	ISBN 978-1-942487-7-15	A young adult novel originally released as a web serial via the BattleCorps website, this work follows cadets at the Nellus Academy on the world of Nestor in the Free Worlds League, and is set in 3067.
Forever Faithful	Blaine Lee Pardoe	c.3078 (19 April 3060 - 22 August 3078 (11 December 3130 prologue) era: Jihad	February 23, 2019 (Catalyst Game Labs)	ISBN 978-1-941582-77-0	In the year 3060, the reborn Star League has destroyed Clan Smoke Jaguar, conquered their home world Huntress, and scattered the few remaining Jaguar warriors to the winds. Now the League seeks to end the Clan invasion for good by using former Smoke Jaguars against their own people.Meanwhile, two bitter enemies seek to salvage a future for the last Jaguars in existence: Trent, who betrayed his wayward Clan to help them regain their honor, and Paul Moon, a disgraced warrior torn between his pledged loyalty to the Star League and a duty to the Smoke Jaguar civilization he was born to protect.But power-hungry predators lurk in Clan space, waiting for the right time to strike the vulnerable Star League forces. And to the victor will go the spoils: the priceless artifacts of a destroyed Clan and the sacred genetics of the final generation of Smoke Jaguar warriors.Trent and Paul Moon must fight tooth and nail against would-be conquerors to save the soul of the surviving Jaguar people before they are consigned to the annals of history. But will their divergent plans tear the survivors apart, or lead them toward freedom?
Iron Dawn	Jennifer Brozek	c.3150 era: Dark Age	April 2019 (Catalyst Game Labs)		Rogue Academy #1. A young adult novel.
Kell Hounds Ascendant	Michael A. Stackpole	c.3010 era: Succession Wars period: Late Succession War - LosTech	July 2019 (Catalyst Game Labs)		Kell Hounds prequel. Includes: Not the Way the Smart Money Bets (previously published via BattleCorps in 2008), A Tiny Spot of Rebellion, A Clever Bit of Fiction.
Redemption Rift	Jason Schmetzer	c.3140 era: Dark Age	September 2019 (Catalyst Game Labs)		
Grey Watch Protocol	Michael J. Ciaravella	c.3150 era: Dark Age	June 2020 (Catalyst Game Labs)		The Highlander Covenant #1
Ghost Hour	Jennifer Brozek	c.3150 era: Dark Age	June 2020 (Catalyst Game Labs)		Rogue Academy #2. A young adult novel.
Honor's Gauntlet	Bryan Young	c.3151 era: ilClan	August 2020 (Catalyst Game Labs)		
Icons of War	Craig A. Reed	c.3147 era: Dark Age	September 2020 (Catalyst Game Labs)		
Children of Kerensky	Blaine Lee Pardoe	c.3151 era: ilClan	October 2020 (Catalyst Game Labs)		
Hour of the Wolf	Blaine Lee Pardoe	c.3151 era: ilClan	January 2021 (Catalyst Game Labs)		
Fall From Glory (authoritative edition)	Randall N. Bills	c.2802 era: Succession Wars period: Early Succession War	March 8, 2021 (Catalyst Game Labs)		Founding of the Clans #1. Originally published in German (as Clangründer: Abkehr). Translated and re-worked into this "authoritative edition" release.
Paid in Blood	Michael J. Ciaravella	c.3150 era: Dark Age	April 2021 (Catalyst Game Labs)		The Highlander Covenant #2
Blood Will Tell	Jason Schmetzer	c.3149 era: Dark Age	May 2021 (Catalyst Game Labs)		
Crimson Night	Jennifer Brozek	c.3150 era: Dark Age	July 2021 (Catalyst Game Labs)		Rogue Academy #3. A young adult novel.
Hunting Season	Philip A. Lee	c.3149 era: Dark Age	August 2021 (Catalyst Game Labs)		
A Rock and a Hard Place	William H. Keith Jr.	c.3028 era: Succession Wars period: Late Succession War - Renaissance	September 21, 2021 (Catalyst Game Labs)		Saga of the Gray Death Legion #3.5
Visions of Rebirth (authoritative edition)	Randall N. Bills	c.2815 era: Succession Wars period: Early Succession War	October 27, 2021 (Catalyst Game Labs)		Founding of the Clans #2. Originally written in German as Clangründer: Traum.
No Substitute for Victory	Blaine Lee Pardoe	c.3151 era: ilClan	January 28, 2022 (Catalyst Game Labs)		
Redemption Rites	Jason Schmetzer	c.3152 era: ilClan	May 1, 2022 (Catalyst Game Labs)		
Land of Dreams	Randall N. Bills	c.2822 era: Succession Wars period: Early Succession War	July 13, 2022 (Catalyst Game Labs)		Founding of the Clans #3
Jaguar's Leap	Reed Bishop	c.3051 era: Clan Invasion	July 13, 2022 (Catalyst Game Labs)		
A Question of Survival	Bryan Young	c.3151 era: ilClan	July 22, 2022 (Catalyst Game Labs)		A Question of Survival #1
The Damocles Sanction	Michael J. Ciaravella	c.3152 era: ilClan	December 30, 2022 (Catalyst Game Labs)		
The Quest for Jardine	Herbert A. Beas II	c.3067 era: Civil War	February 21, 2024 (Catalyst Game Labs)		Forgotten Worlds #1-3. Includes: The Hunt for Jardine, Finding Jardine, and Escape from Jardine.
Without Question	Bryan Young	c.3152 era: ilClan	May 15, 2024 (Catalyst Game Labs)		A Question of Survival #2

== Other BattleTech fiction ==
BattleTech fiction (anthologies, novellas, short stories, and magazines) not classified as "novels." The majority of this list comprises titles released or re-released by Catalyst Game Labs, including BattleCorps stories. This is not an exhaustive list of BattleCorps stories. This list also does not include fiction in the BattleTech tabletop rule books.

Title	Author	Chronology	Published	ISBN	Synopsis
Shrapnel: Fragments from the Inner Sphere	Tara Gallagher; William H. Keith Jr.; James Lanigan; Mark O'Green; Bear Peters; Susan Putney; Michael A. Stackpole; Ken St. Andre	c.3028 (2980 – 3028) era: Succession Wars period: Late Succession War - Renaissance	1988 (FASA)	1-55560-082-4	An anthology of short stories meant to bring more life to the BattleTech tabletop game universe. Includes: Old MechWarriors Never...; Black Cats Cross Your Path; Think Like a Liao (c.3026); Dance of Vengeance; And Then There Was the Time...; Dispatch (c.3028); Legion Team; Where Lies the Honor?; Natasha Kerensky: A Biomedical Report (c.3023); Painting the Town; The Race Is Not to the Swift; Final Exam; Judas Blind.
Lion’s Roar	Steven Mohan Jr.	c.3064 era: Civil War	July 6, 2007 (Catalyst Game Labs)		
The Corps	Loren L. Coleman; Michael A. Stackpole; Blaine Lee Pardoe; Robert Thurston; Randall N. Bills; Dan Duval; Ilsa Bick; Kevin Killiany; Jason M. Hardy; Louisa M. Swann; Phaedra M. Weldon; Steve Mohan Jr.	c.3067 era: Civil War	May 1, 2008 (Catalyst Game Labs)		BattleCorps Anthologies #1. Includes: A Race to the End; Damage Control; Eight Nine Three; Isolation's Weight; Destiny's Call; Poison; The Immortal Warrior at the Battle of Vorhaven; Ghost of Christmas Present; Zeroing In; For Want of a Nail; Art of the Deal; McKenna Station; Echoes in the Void; The Longest Road; The Back Road; Commerce Is All; En Passant; Destiny's Challenge.
Not the Way the Smart Money Bets	Michael A. Stackpole	c.3010 era: Succession Wars period: Late Succession War - LosTech	May 16, 2008 (Catalyst Game Labs)		Kell Hounds Ascendant #1
Hector	Jason Schmetzer	c.3019 era: Succession Wars period: Late Succession War - LosTech	May 23, 2008 (Catalyst Game Labs)		
Eclipse	Jason Schmetzer	c.3072 era: Jihad	July 1, 2008 (Catalyst Game Labs)		
First Strike	Loren L. Coleman; Jeff Kautz; Randall N. Bills; Louisa M. Swann; Dayle A. Dermatis; Phaedra M. Weldon; Kevin Killiany; Steve Mohan Jr.; Jason Schmetzer; Blaine Lee Pardoe; Jason M. Hardy; Dan Duval; Victor Milán	c.3067 era: Civil War	December 1, 2010 (Catalyst Game Labs)		BattleCorps Anthologies #2. Includes: Broken Blade; Gravity Poisoning; Every Twelve Seconds...; On the Square; Old Legends Never Die; The Price of Conviction; Ants; Mirage; The Heart of Dixie; Pirate Hunt; Be Not Afraid of Greatness; Callie's Call; Pack Hunters; Red Khopesh; The Last Full Measure; Of War and Peace and Cherry Trees; Fall of the Blossom.
Trial Under Fire	Loren L. Coleman	c.3060 (28 April 3060 - 6 May 3060) era: Clan Invasion	March 28, 2011 (Catalyst Game Labs)		MechWarrior 3 novelization.
Instrument of Destruction	Steven Mohan Jr.	c.3052 era: Clan Invasion	February 13, 2012 (Catalyst Game Labs)		Ghost Bear’s Lament #1
The Frost Advances	Jason Schmetzer	c.3071 era: Jihad	February 15, 2012 (Catalyst Game Labs)		Operation ICE STORM #1
The Fading Call of Glory	Steven Mohan Jr.	c.3073 era: Jihad	April 30, 2012 (Catalyst Game Labs)		Ghost Bear’s Lament #1
Weapons Free	Herbert A. Beas; Dayle A. Dermatis; Colin Donnelly; Dan C. Duval; Jason M. Hardy; Jeff Kautz; Kevin Killiany; David McCulloch; Steve Mohan Jr.; Annie Reed; Ben Rome; Jason Schmetzer; Phaedra M. Weldon	c.3068 era: Jihad	June 11, 2012 (Catalyst Game Labs)		BattleCorps Anthologies #3. Includes: Cockroaches; The Unkindest Cut of All; Growing Up; Sniper; Biendieu; When the Bears Left; Theseus Knot; The Gulf of Reason; The Bitter Taste of Hope; Pledges of Allegiance; Making a Name; The Last Day of Zeta; Eye of the Beholder; A Guy Walks Into A Bar...; Blitzernte; A Distant Thunder.
The Winds of Spring	Jason Schmetzer	c.3072 era: Jihad	August 1, 2012 (Catalyst Game Labs)		Operation ICE STORM #2
Vengeance	Jason Schmetzer	c.3046 era: Succession Wars period: Late Succession War - Renaissance	December 10, 2012 (Catalyst Game Labs)		
Edge of the Storm	Jason Schmetzer	c.3068 era: Jihad	December 10, 2012 (Catalyst Game Labs)		Lennox's Light Horse #1-4. Includes: The Gulf of Reason; Sound and Fury; Monster; Toil and Trouble.
Fire for Effect	Herbert A. Beas II; Ilsa J. Bick; Randall N. Bills; Jason M. Hardy; Chris Hartford; Steven Mohan; Jr.; Jason Schmetzer; Louisa M. Swann; Phaedra M. Weldon	c.3069 era: Jihad	August 23, 2013 (Catalyst Game Labs)		BattleCorps Anthologies #4. Includes: Case White: Alpha; Case White: The Breaking of Chemical Bonds; Case White: Stars in the Time of Dreaming; Case White: Backroads at Night; Case White: By the Sword; Case White: To Serve and Protect; Case White: The Voice of the Resistance; Case White: The Good Fight; Case White: Omega; The Day After; A Thing to be Done; Forgotten Worlds: The Hunt for Jardine; Hunter or Hunted; Self Defense; The Shaded Light; An Emissary of Heaven; Rehab.
Onslaught: Tales from the Clan Invasion!	Steven Mohan Jr.; Jason Schmetzer; Philip A. Lee; Craig A. Reed; Chris Hussey; Steven Mohan Jr.; Jason Hansa	c.3054 era: Clan Invasion	September 11, 2013 (Catalyst Game Labs)		Includes: A New Game; Fourth Form; Double Down; My Father's Sword; The Tools We Serve; Superior; Three Points of Pride.
Chaos Born	Kevin Killiany	c.3067 era: Civil War	October 26, 2013 (Catalyst Game Labs)		Chaos Irregulars #1. Includes: Decision at Acamar; Crossroads at Outreach; Determination at Wallis; Encounter at El Giza; Gambit at Noisiel.
Chaos Formed.	Kevin Killiany	c.3067 era: Civil War	December 3, 2013 (Catalyst Game Labs)		Chaos Irregulars #2. Includes: Gambit at Noisiel (Part II); Endgame at Engadine; Convergence at Khon Kaen; Crucible at Campoleone.
Counterattack	Christian Grainger; Jason Hardy; John Helfers; Chris Hussey; Kevin Killiany; Philip A. Lee; Steven Mohan Jr.; Blaine Lee Pardoe; Ben Rome; Jason Schmetzer; Phaedra Weldon	c.3072 era: Jihad	August 14, 2014 (Catalyst Game Labs)		BattleCorps Anthologies #5. Includes: An Ill-Made House; Unholy Union; Abandonment; With Carrion Men; First Acquisition; High-Value Target; Twisting in the Vacuum; Godfather; Blue Waters; Office Politics; Godt Bytte; The Smaller Sacrifice; Feral.
Front Lines	Harper Brand; Jason Hansa; Chris Hussey; Steven Mohan Jr.; Blaine Lee Pardoe; Christopher Purnell	c.3072 era: Jihad	August 5, 2016 (Catalyst Game Labs)		BattleCorps Anthologies #6. Includes: The Few, The Lucky; Operation Rat: The Totalitarian Mind; Hikagemono; Something More; The Discovery of Command; Son of Blake; A Light in the Dark; Irreplaceable; Last Stop; Brothers in Arms.
Legacy	Alan Brundage; Aaron Cahall; Alex Fauth; Jason Hansa; Travis Heermann; Chris Hussey; Robert Jeschonek; Kevin Killiany; Philip A. Lee; Darrell Myers; Craig A. Reed; Geoff Swift	c.3090 era: Dark Age period: Republic Age	August 17, 2017 (Catalyst Game Labs)		Includes: What's in a Name?; Swords of Light and Darkness; Fates and Fortunes; The Forgotten Places; One Man's Trash; Lightning Strike; Choices and Chances; The Third Pillar; Earthbound; Underfoot; Homecoming; End of the Road; Epilogue: Where Legends Come to Rest.
A Splinter of Hope, The Anvil	Philip A. Lee, Blaine Lee Pardoe	c.3148 (3 September 3147 - 30 August 3148) era: Dark Age	August 2, 2018 (Catalyst Game Labs)	978-1-941582-56-5	Two new novellas released in one book, A Splinter of Hope covers fighting between the Capellan Confederation and the Federated suns in 3147 and 3148, with most of the action taking place on New Syrtis and focusing on Julian Davion. The Anvil covers Jade Falcon Khan Malvina Hazen's attacks on the Lyran Commonwealth in 3148, with details on how the Mongol Doctrine has spread throughout the Falcon touman.
A Tiny Spot of Rebellion	Michael A. Stackpole	c.3010 era: Succession Wars period: Late Succession War - LosTech	March 22, 2019 (Catalyst Game Labs)		Kell Hounds Ascendant #2
A Clever Bit of Fiction	Michael A. Stackpole	c.3010 era: Succession Wars period: Late Succession War - LosTech	March 27, 2019 (Catalyst Game Labs)		Kell Hounds Ascendant #3
Kill Zone	Stephan A. Frabartolo; Jason Hansa; Travis Heermann; Kevin Killiany; Blaine Lee Pardoe; Craig A. Reed; Lance Scarinci; Jason Schmetzer	c.3078 era: Jihad	July 23, 2019 (Catalyst Game Labs)		BattleCorps Anthologies #7. Includes: Operation Rat: Tomorrow's Shine; Bad Water; The Loyal Son; Reap What You Sow; Arms of the Destroyer; Operation Klondike: To Lead and Serve; Feather versus Mountain & Rise and Shine; Operation Scythe: Those Who Stand High; Operation Scythe: Lyran Fire.
Gray Markets	Alan Brundage; Philip A. Lee; Chris Hussey; Craig A. Reed; David G. Martin; Aaron Cahall	c.3025 era: Succession Wars period: Late Succession War - Renaissance	January 20, 2020 (Catalyst Game Labs)		BattleCorps Anthologies #8. Includes: Forsaken; A Measure of Clarity; Gustrell Switchback; In Service to the Dragon; Murphy's Method; Permanent Losses.
Slack Tide	Philip A. Lee; David G. Martin; Aaron Cahall; Alan Brundage; Jason Hansa; Chris Hussey; Craig A. Reed Jr.; Richard C. White; Geoff Swift	c.3053 era: Clan Invasion	February 21, 2020 (Catalyst Game Labs)		BattleCorps Anthologies #9. Includes: Horn and Fang; That Old Highlander Way; Save What You Can; I Was Lost; A Cold Collaboration; Once You Go Traitor; Shadow Angels; No Rest for the Wicked; Duty Before Honor.
Shell Games	Jason Schmetzer	c.3149 era: Dark Age	May 1, 2020 (Catalyst Game Labs)		
Divided We Fall	Blaine Lee Pardoe	c.3150 era: Dark Age	May 1, 2020 (Catalyst Game Labs)		
Shrapnel (The Official BattleTech Magazine) Issue #1	Loren L. Coleman; John Helfers; Philip A. Lee; David A. Kerber; Chris Hussey; Michael J. Ciaravella; Blaine Lee Pardoe; Patrick Wynne; Jason Hansa; Craig A. Reed Jr.; Lance Scarinci; Patrick Wynne; Michael A. Stackpole; Michael J. Ciaravella; Craig A. Reed Jr.; Patrick Wynne; Aaron Cahall; Kevin Killiany	c.3149 (3011 - 3149) era: Dark Age	June 15, 2020 (Catalyst Game Labs, Pulse Publishing)	978-1-947335-20-2	Includes: Grimm Sentence (c.3049); Secrets of the Sphere: The Cameron Question (c.3051); The Flames of Idlewind (c.3050); Forgotten Heroes, Slandered Honor (c.3096); Airs Above the Ground (c.3050); Sniper Rifles: Death from a Distance; Yesterday's Enemy (c.3052); Missing Duke Spurs Demonstration (c.3094); If Auld Acquaintance Be Forgot..., PART 1 OF 4 (c.3011); Unit Digest: Eridani Light Horse - 11th Recon Battalion; Tales from the Cracked Canopy: Blind Arrogance (c.3090); Mother of Resistance Dead on Vipaava (c.3125); Target of Opportunity Chaos Campaign scenario (c.3125); Wars and Rumors (c.3149).
Rock of the Republic	Blaine Lee Pardoe	c.3149 era: Dark Age	July 28, 2020 (Catalyst Game Labs)		
Shrapnel (The Official BattleTech Magazine) Issue #2	Loren L. Coleman; John Helfers; Philip A. Lee; David A. Kerber; Alan Brundage; Daniel Isberner; James Simakas; Chris Wheeler; Michael J. Ciaravella; Matthew Cross; Travis Heermann; Michael A. Stackpole; Tom Stanley; Jason Schmetzer; Aaron Cahall; Alex Kaempen; John-David Karnitz	c.3150 (2986 - 3150) era: Dark Age	September 15, 2020 (Catalyst Game Labs, Pulse Publishing)	978-1-947335-34-9	Includes: Scavengers Blood (c.2986); Assassination Protocol: Kafka (c.3144); Flash'd His Sabre Bare (c.3036); CN10-B Centurion; Devil Take the Hindmost (c.3051); Gauss Rifles (c.3125); Daybreak on Shining Mountain (c.3075); Secrets of the Sphere: The ProtoMech Problem (c.3150); If Auld Acquaintance Be Forgot..., PART 2 OF 4 (c.3011); Planet Digest: Minette III; Tales from the Cracked Canopy: Giving Up (c.3083); Chaos Campaign Scenario: Flight of the Falcon; RPG Adventure Seeds: The Lost Division (c.3149); The Road Ahead (c.3050).
Shrapnel (The Official BattleTech Magazine) Issue #3	Lance Scarinci; Chris Hussey; Blaine Lee Pardoe; Eric Salzman; Charles Dallas; Craig A. Reed Jr.; Daniel Isberner; Michael A. Stackpole; Alex Kaempen; Loren L. Coleman; David Smith; Daniel Isberner; Tom Stanley; Bryn Bills; Bryan Young.	c.3150 (2790 - 3150) era: Dark Age	December 15, 2020 (Catalyst Game Labs, Pulse Publishing)	978-1-947335-66-0	Includes: The Metal Man (c.2984); Voices of the Sphere: Star League Day (c.3150); Waylon's War (c.Dark Age era); The Great Reavings (c.3146); Technical Readout: Thunder Stallion 4; Laws Are Silent (c.3068); Scenario: Reindeer Down (c.3149); If Auld Acquaintance Be Forgot... PART 3 OF 4 (c.3011); Unit Digest: 138th Mechanized Infantry Division Veterans Association; Tales from the Cracked Canopy: The Razor's Edge of Opportunity (c.Jihad era); Pistols: Up Close and Personal; Doc Bens (c.2790); Assassination Protocol: Katherine Steiner-Davion (c.3144); Scenario: Order Through Strength (c.3125); The Prince of Skye (c.3138); The Secret Fox (c.3143).
The Battle of Tukayyid	Randall N. Bills; Michael J. Ciaravella; Chris Hussey; Steven Mohan Jr.; Blaine Lee Pardoe; Jason Schmetzer; Joel Steverson; Bryan Young	c.3052 era: Clan Invasion	January 15, 2021 (Catalyst Game Labs)		The Battle of Tukayyid #1-9. Includes: Blake's Own, Two Roads Diverged, Shadow of Death, The Burdens of Honor, Always Moving, The Lions of Prezno, The Icarus Lament, We Do the Impossible, Broken Promises.
Shrapnel (The Official BattleTech Magazine) Issue #4	Charles Gideon; Eric Salzman; Jason Schmetzer; Craig A. Reed Jr.; Giles Gammage; Ken Horner; Faith McClosky; Matthew Cross; David Razi; Michael J. Ciaravella; Stephen W. Toropov; Harper Brand; Aaron Cahall; Marc Follin; Joel Steverson; James Lee.	c.3151 (2236 - 3151) era: ilClan	March 15, 2021 (Catalyst Game Labs, Pulse Publishing)	978-1-947335-73-8	Includes: Gratitude Repaid (c.3066); Voices of the Sphere: Cryogenics (c.3150); The Bye-Bye Brigade (c.3024); Technical Readout: UM-R90 SuburbanMech; Inverted (c.2236); Advice from a Social General: How to Party (c.3151); Roadblock (c.3077); PPCs (c.3125); Sackcloth and Sand (c.3073); Unit Digest: Seychelles' Stonehearts; Ghost Ships Galore: The Pride of New Samarkand (c.3148); Tales from the Cracked Canopy: The Red Wraith (c.3084); Chaos Campaign Scenario: Sword of Sedition (c.3135); The Weight of a Name (c.3148); Make 'Mechs Matter: 'Mech-less Roleplaying (c.3150); All Good Things (c.3057).
The Mercenary Life	Randall N. Bills; Philip A. Lee	c.3014 era: Succession Wars period: Late Succession War - LosTech	April 13, 2021 (Catalyst Game Labs)		MechWarrior 5 Origins #1-8. Includes: The Calm of the Void, Vision's Hunger, Endless War, Contested Dreams, Dissimulate Wanderer, Knives in the Dark, A Skein of Schemes, Obligation's Forge, The Sun Will Rise. Originally released as a free e-book on the MechWarrior 5 website. Later re-released for sale on Catalyst Game Labs.
The Proliferation Cycle	Ilsa J. Bick; Herbert A. Beas II; Christoffer Trossen; Randall N. Bills; Chris Hartford; Jason Hardy; Jason Schmetzer; Blaine Lee Pardoe	c.2863 era: Succession Wars period: Early Succession War	May 13, 2021 (Catalyst Game Labs)		The Proliferation Cycle #1-7. Includes: Break-Away; Prometheus Unbound; Nothing Ventured; Fall Down Seven Times, Get Up Eight; A Dish Served Cold; The Spider Dances; The Trickster.
Shrapnel (The Official BattleTech Magazine) Issue #5	Loren L. Coleman; John Helfers; Philip A. Lee; David A. Kerber; Lance Scarinci; Chris Hussey; Daniel Isberner; Matt Alexander; Johannes Heidler; Bryan Young; Eric Salzman; Michael A. Stackpole; Craig A. Reed Jr.; Michael J. Ciaravella; Jr.; Mike Miller; Aaron Cahall; Paul Sjardijn; Joel Steverson; Tom Leveen	c.3151 (2814 - 3151) era: ilClan	June 15, 2021 (Catalyst Game Labs, Pulse Publishing)	978-1-63861-021-2	Includes: Ghosts (c.3091); Voices of the Sphere: What Would Have Been and What is Now (c.3151); Black Boxes (c.3150); Piece by Piece (c.3010); CRD-10S Crusader; The Fox Patrol (c.3145); Glorious Labor for the Celestial Wisdom: A Capellan Servitor's Guide to Proper Conduct; If Auld Acquaintance Be Forgot..., PART 4 OF 4 (c.3011); Submachine Guns: Spray and Pray; Secrets of the Sphere: Three-Clan Monte (c.3151); Tales from the Cracked Canopy: Shadows of the Past (c.3090); Planet Digest: Kandersteg; SM5 Field Commander (Prototype); An Ice-Cold Dish (c.3067); Alekseyevka Academy's Anti-'Mech Infantry Course (c.3151); Breach (c.2814).
Shrapnel (The Official BattleTech Magazine) Issue #6	Loren L. Coleman; John Helfers; Philip A. Lee; David A. Kerber; Mark Hill; Eric Salzman; Jason Schmetzer; E. Clark Avery; Wunji Lau; Blaine Lee Pardoe; Stephen Toropov; Alexander J. Roth; Joel Steverson; M. W. Hayden; Craig A. Reed Jr.; Ken Horner; James Bixby; James Kirtley; Daniel Isberner	c.3151 (3012 - 3151) era: ilClan	September 13, 2021 (Catalyst Game Labs, Pulse Publishing)	978-1-63861-039-7	Includes: Paper Tiger (c.3012); Voices of the Sphere: The Republic Armed Forces (c.3151); Point of View (c.3050); Technical Readout: Victor C; Almost Sounds Like the Guns Themselves (c.3027); Plasma, Plasma, and More Plasma (c.3144); One Door Closes (c.3151); Persuading Parliament: A Lobbyist's Guide to Atreus (c.3151); Tales from the Cracked Canopy: The Devil's Luck (c.3081); Maskirovka Reports: Tiamat Crashes Into the Wall (c.3150); Diamandis' Dogs (c.3047); Electioneering: A MechWarrior: Destiny Mission Briefing (c.3149); Vengeance Games, PART 1 OF 4 (c.3084); Chaos Campaign Scenario: The Ballad of Sir Lobos Plumados (c.3063); The Poisoner's Pen: Advice from the Ebon Magistrate; Ace Darwin and the Sidewinder Canyon (c.3035); After-Action Report: Barlow's End (c.3026); Moving Forward (c.3151).
Shrapnel (The Official BattleTech Magazine) Issue #7	Craig A. Reed Jr.; Bryan Young; Tom Leveen; Julian Michael Carver; Wunji Lau; Chris Wheeler; J. D. Neal; Joel Steverson; Paul Sjardijn and Aaron Cahall; Matthew Cross; Étienne Charron-Willard; Jim Hauser; Curtis O. Thompson; Tom Stanley; Charles Gideon; Eric Salzman; E. Stephenson Auerbach	c.3151 (2765 - 3151) era: ilClan	December 16, 2021 (Catalyst Game Labs, Pulse Publishing)	978-1-63861-085-4	Includes: Shards of a Broken Sword (c.2971); Voices of the Sphere: Twenty Years of Messages in Bottles (c.3151); The Fox and the Bear: A Fox Patrol Story (c.3148); HCT-5D Hatchetman; Anchors Aweigh (c.2765); The Winter Holiday; Promise (c.2815); Please Hold for the Clan Sea Fox Customer Care and Service Department (c.3149); The Art of Salvage (c.3125); Vengeance Games, PART 2 OF 4 (c.3084); Behind the Curtain: The Exituri's Holiday Traditions (c.3150); The Delicate Art of Gift Giving in the Draconis Combine; The Thirst for Vengeance (c.3135); One Last Favor, Old Friend: A MechWarrior: Destiny Mission Briefing (c.3145); Combat Shotguns: For Close Encounters; Protector of the Blood (c.3146); Chaos Campaign Scenario: The Christmas Eve Coup (c.3060); The Tale of the Abominable Icemonster (c.3151); The Honor Road (c.3150).
No Greater Honor	Joel Steverson; Craig A. Reed Jr.; Christopher Hussey; Randall N. Bills; Jason Hansa; Daniel Isberner; Alan Brundage; Jason Schmetzer; Michael J. Ciaravella	c.3151 era: ilClan	February 25, 2022 (Catalyst Game Labs)		The Complete Eridani Light Horse Chronicles #1-10. Includes: Conflicts of Interest; No Tears; Dying Dignity; The Hand that Feeds; There's No We in Mercenary; Failings in Teaching; View From the Ground; No Dust, No Wear; The Day When Heaven Was Falling; Strong as Steel.
Elements of Treason: Duty	Craig A. Reed Jr.	c.3152 era: ilClan	March 1, 2022 (Catalyst Game Labs)		Elements of Treason #1
Shrapnel (The Official BattleTech Magazine) Issue #8	Craig A. Reed Jr.; Jason Hansa; James Bixby; Eric Salzman; John-David Karnitz; Joel Steverson; Douglas Carruthers; Johannes Heidler; Mike Miller; Wunji Lau; Stephen Toropov; Ken Horner; Tom Stanley; Keith R. A. DeCandido; Daniel Isberner; Joshua Franklin; Jeremy Ciccone	c.3152 (3015 - 3152) era: ilClan	March 15, 2022 (Catalyst Game Labs, Pulse Publishing)	978-1-63861-062-5	Includes: Better Days (c.3015); Voices of the Sphere: Mixed-Tech 'Mechs (c.3152); Hollow Glory (c.3042); Executioner-B (Gladiator-B); The Old Rules of Hire (c.3069); Operation Hollywood; Adapt and Flourish: A Greeting to New Citizens of the Federated Suns (c.3104); The Great UrbanMech Uprising (c.3122); Unit Digest: First Augustine Arquebusiers; Vengeance Games, PART 3 OF 4 (c.3084); The Malthus Confederation (c.3152); Ace Darwin and the Battle of the Beer Fridge (c.3057); Bainbridge's Guide to Impactful Exoflora; A Fistful of Kerenskys: Trading in the Wolf Empire (c.3151); Meiyo (c.3071); Shadow and Sin: Secrets of the Canopian Pleasure Circuses (c.3143); Tales from the Cracked Canopy: Silent Roar (c.3084); SAFE Quarterly Threat Assessment (c.3151); Campaign: A Short Stop in Astrokaszy; Farewell Song (c.3042).
Shrapnel (The Official BattleTech Magazine) Issue #9	Loren L. Coleman; John Helfers; Philip A. Lee; David A. Kerber; Alex Fairbanks; Eric Salzman; Bryan Young; Craig A. Reed Jr.; Étienne Charron-Willard; Daniel Isberner; Phillip Johnston; Alex Fauth; Joshua C. Perian; David G. Martin; Alayna M. Weathers; Ben Klinefelter; Matthew Cross; Olli Rosnell; Jim Hauser; David Smith	c.3152 (2870 - 3152) era: ilClan	June 15, 2022 (Catalyst Game Labs, Pulse Publishing)	978-1-63861-180-6	Includes: Eagles Over Scarborough (c.3033); Voices of the Sphere: The Hinterlands (c.3152); A Fox on Galatea (A Fox Patrol Story) (c.3149); Technical Readout: RSN-1 Rattlesnake II; Dezgra (c.2870); Quikscell: Tax Evasion or Typo? (c.3149); Widowmaker; Unit Digest: Big Kev's Brigade; The Power of Light: Personal Laser Weaponry; Unity City with a View (c.3152); Lost Ghosts (c.3083); Fates Both Cruel and Kind; Senescent Warriors Association (c.3152); Vengeance Games, PART 4 OF 4 (c.3085); The Clan Upgrade (c.3125); Meat, Metal, Ham (c.2978); Chaos Campaign Scenario: The Mad Stampede (c.3140); Planet Digest: Kyeinnisan; Lucky Bastard (c.3059).
Elements of Treason: Opportunity	Craig A. Reed Jr.	c.3151 era: ilClan	August 1, 2022 (Catalyst Game Labs)		Elements of Treason #2
Marauder (A Battletech Anthology)	Lance Scarinci	c.3151 era: ilClan	August 25, 2022 (Catalyst Game Labs)		The Black Marauder #1-4. Includes: Marauder, Kindred Soul, Ravager, Ghost Hunting.
Shrapnel (The Official BattleTech Magazine) Issue #10	Loren L. Coleman; John Helfers; Philip A. Lee; David A. Kerber; Donavan Dufault; Tom Stanley; Steve P. Vincent; Jason Schmetzer; Geoff 'Doc' Swift; Harvey Roberts; Ken Horner; Jason Hansa; James Bixby; Stephen Toropov; Giles Gammage; Eric Salzman; Daniel Isberner; Wunji Lau; Tom Leveen; Joel Steverson; Julian Michael Carver; Alex Fauth; Lance Scarinci; Jennifer Bixby; Joshua Franklin; Matthew Cross; Étienne Charron-Willard; James Lee	c.3152 (2581 - 3152) era: ilClan	September 15, 2022 (Catalyst Game Labs, Pulse Publishing)	978-1-63861-204-9	Includes: Receiving Ends (c.3050); Voices of the Sphere: Battle of Luthien Centennial (c.3152); All Those Left Behind (c.3028); HL-1 Hel; Forbidden Lore (c.3014); The Bullets Never Stop: The History of the Immortal Warrior; Bad and Worse (c.3057); Bainbridge's Guide to Impactful Exofauna; A Trial Most Acceptable (c.3078); Unit Digest: Kara's Scorchers; Marine Vulpine Revocery, a MechWarrior: Destiny Mission Briefing (c.3089); Undefeated (c.3052); 24 Hours (poem by Alayna M. Weathers); Chaos Campaign Scenario: Battle of the Belt; Flying Kites (c.3146); Sea*List Ads (c.3151); Dynamic Ordnance and Ammunition, 20-Year Market Assessment (c.3152); TR-B-9 Toro; Three Ways Home, PART 1 OF 4 (c.2581); Three Ways Home, PART 2 OF 4 (c.2581); The Bull Has Turned: A Guide to Coping with Grief and Loss (c.3151); Rain of Metal (c.3064); Planet Digest: Pain; Wolf Pelts and Raven Feathers (c.3151); Rise of the Koa (c.3026); Campaign: Wolf Howl; The Last Flight of the Black Condor (c.3075); Chaos Campaign Scenario: Cutting the Competition (c.3115); This Too Shall Pass (c.3058).
Onikuma (short story)	Charles Gideon	c.3145 era: Dark Age	October 31, 2022 (Catalyst Game Labs)		Free download from Catalyst Game Labs store.
Fox Tales	Bryan Young	c.3151 era: ilClan	November 1, 2022 (Catalyst Game Labs)		The Fox Patrol #1-5. Includes: The Secret Fox, The Fox Patrol, The Fox and the Bear, A Fox on Galatea, The Fox Hunt.
Shrapnel (The Official BattleTech Magazine) Issue #11	Tom Leveen; Bryan Young; Russell Zimmerman; D.G.P. Rector; Stephen Toropov; Chris G. Lane; Étienne Charron-Willard; Wunji Lau; W. T. Brown; Matt Cross; Eric Salzman; James Hauser; James Bixby; Wunji Lau; Alayna M. Weathers; R. J. Thomas; Eric Salzman; Tom Stanley	c.3152 (3024 - 3152) era: ilClan	December 15, 2022 (Catalyst Game Labs, Pulse Publishing)	978-1-63861-116-5	Includes: The Plowshare; Voices of the Sphere: The New Mercenary Market (c.3152); Signing Day; BTL-C-20 Battle Cobra; Ghostbird; Cockpit Amenities in Modern BattleMechs (c.3151); Unit Digest: First Kearny Highlanders; Up Close; Inner Sphere Ingenuity (c.3125); Comin' to Towne: A Role-Playing Adventure (c.3149); Hell's Highway; Solahma Death Song (poem by Phillip Johnston); Information Software at War: The Automated BattleMech Recognition Framework (c.3149); Three Ways Home, PART 3 OF 4; The Few and the Many: The Canopian Medical Industry's Cultural Isolation (c.3152); Merrymakers; The Space Cowboys From Quatre Belle; After Action Report: Longbow Mountain (c.3024); Battleforce Scenario: Our Two Weeks' Notice (c.3150); Seal the Deal.
Riptides	Randall N. Bills	c.3151 era: ilClan	January 13, 2023 (Catalyst Game Labs)		The Mercenary Tales #1
Lethal Lessons	Daniel Isberner	c.3151 era: ilClan	January 28, 2023 (Catalyst Game Labs)		
Innocent, and Defenseless	Jason Hansa	c.2754 era: Star League	February 10, 2023 (Catalyst Game Labs)		The Mercenary Tales #2
Perception of Victory	Michael J. Ciaravella	c.3151 era: ilClan	March 10, 2023 (Catalyst Game Labs)		The Mercenary Tales #3
Shrapnel (The Official BattleTech Magazine) Issue #12	Tom Leveen; Geoff "Doc" Swift; Charles Gideon; Robert Schubert; Kelvin Casing; Wunji Lau; Alan Brundage; Jason Hansa; Alex Fauth; Eric Salzman; Jason DeSouza; Ben Klinefelter; Lorcan Nagle; Ken Horner; Stephen Toropov; Alayna M. Weathers; James Bixby; Daniel Isberner; Chris Hussey; Craig A. Reed Jr.; Matt Larson; James Kirtley	c.3151 era: ilClan	March 14, 2023 (Catalyst Game Labs, Pulse Publishing)	979-8-98535-994-7	Includes: Without Warning; Voices of the Sphere: Mercenary Dependents; It Ends in Fire; JN-G9B Jinggau; The Shoulders of Giants; Unit Digest: Steel Wolves; Death to Mercenaries: Rhetoric vs. Reality; Winning the Battle, Losing the War; Unit Digest: Old Guard (Hansen's Roughriders); A Funny Thing Happened on the Way to the Homeland; Dying Breed; Mercenary Entertainment Network Digest: December 3151; Sea*List Ads: The Kandersteg Catalog; Everything Up There; Three Ways Home, PART 4 OF 4; No Hard Feelings: How to Maintain Professionalism When You Kill People For a Living; Planet Digest: Rahway II; Foolproof; A Game of Armored Combat: Celebrating 700 Years of BattleMech Warfare; The Graceland Gaffe: A MechWarrior: Destiny Mission Briefing; Making Them Pay: Mercenary Logistics and Finances For the Freebooting Quartermaster; Three White Roses; Unit Digest: Killer Bees; One Thousand; Chaos Campaign Scenario: Am I My Brother's Keeper?; Never Trust the Recruitment Posters.
Giving up the Ghost	Bryan Young	c.3146 (5 September - 1 October 3146) era: Dark Age	May 3, 2023 (Catalyst Game Labs)		Fortunes of War #1
BattleTech Pride Anthology 2023	Robin Briseño; Albert Ross; Allen Nickloy; Milla Koponen; Russell Zimmerman; Comments from Bryan Young & Michael A. Stackpole	c.3151 (3129 - 3151) era: ilClan	June 1, 2023 (itch.io)	n/a	A free release from itch.io. Includes: Word From The Amazing (For You From Established Authors); Masquerade (c.3129); Small (c.3030); Test Drive (c.3149); Dragon Slayer (c.3151); Old Wounds, Old Words (c.3047).
Elements of Treason: Honor	Craig A. Reed Jr.	c.3152 era: ilClan	June 1, 2023 (Catalyst Game Labs)		Elements of Treason #3
Shrapnel (The Official BattleTech Magazine) Issue #13	Bryan Young; Russell Zimmerman; David G. Martin; Adam Neff; Ben Klinefelter; Wunji Lau; Stephen Toropov; Joshua C. Perian; Giles Gammage; Ken' Horner; Zac Schwartz; Westin Riverside; Eric Salzman; Matthew Cross; Joseph A. Cosgrove; Ed Stephens	c.3152 era: ilClan	June 14, 2023	978-1-63861-137-0	Including: The Swamp Fox; Voices of the Sphere: Cushioning the Culture Shock; Acceptable Losses; Technical Reaodut: ALB-6U Albatross; Drawing the Short Straw; The Curious Case of Colin Coolidge's Cooling Suit; Reversal of Fortunes; Bainbridge's Guide to Impactful Geography; Unit Digest: Wilson's Hussars; Run, Locust, Run; A Ship Out of Time; Lone Wolf and Fox, PART 1 OF 4; RPG Adventure: Tinker, Tailor, Seamstress, Spy; Tales from the Cracked Canopy: No Rest for the Accursed; Ascending the Pecking Order: Political Warfare in the Raven Alliance; Starving Vultures; Planet Digest: Gandy's Luck; Alpha Strike Scenario: Strike and Fade; The Wreckoning.
Shrapnel (The Official BattleTech Magazine) Year One	Loren L. Coleman; Michael A. Stackpole; Kevin Killiany; Michael J. Ciaravella; Craig Reed Jr.; Jason Schmetzer; Lance Scarinci; Bryan Young; et al.	c.3151 (2236 - 3151) era: ilClan	August 25, 2023 (Catalyst Game Labs, Pulse Publishing)	n/a	Includes: Shrapnel (The Official BattleTech Magazine) Issues #1-4, BONUS: If Auld Acquaintance Be Forgot... PART 4 OF 4.
Shrapnel (The Official BattleTech Magazine) Issue #14	Bryan Young; Chris Hussey; Marc Follin; Jaymie Wagner; Jeremy A. Reynolds; Étienne Charron-Willard; Chris Wheeler; David Stier; James Kirtley; Matt Larson; Eric Salzman; James Bixby; Thomas Stanley; Stephen Toropov; Geoff "Doc" Swift; Zac Schwartz; Lorcan Nagle; J. D. Neal	c.3152 era: ilClan	September 15, 2023	978-1-63861-142-4	Includes: Millennium Marauder; Voices of the Sphere: ComStar; Hard Choices; Technical Readout: SHD-3H Shadow Hawk; Payback Strike; C.U.P.P.S.: Civilian UrbanMech Patrol and Protection Service; Chaos Campaign Scenario: Dig Two Graves; …And Full of Terrors; Legion of the Dead; Great Work; Sphere's Most Wanted: Republic 3084; Unit Digest: The Scourge; Fighting for the Past; Chaos Campaign Scenario: Braunschweig Breakout; Lone Wolf and Fox, PART 2 OF 4; Planet Digest: Indicass; Out of the Ashes; Campaign: Water Raid; A Little off the Top.
Emerald Sword	Tom Leveen	c.2978 era: Clan Homeworlds (Succession Wars) period: Clan Homeworlds (Late Succession War - LosTech)	September 24, 2023 (Catalyst Game Labs)		
Blood Rage	Craig A. Reed Jr.	c.3070 era: Jihad	November 13, 2023 (Catalyst Game Labs)		Fortunes of War #2
If Auld Acquaintance Be Forgot…	Michael A. Stackpole	c.3011 era: Succession Wars period: Late Succession War - LosTech	November 27, 2023 (Catalyst Game Labs)		Kell Hounds Ascendant #4 This is the entire novella, If Auld Acquaintance Be Forgot…, previously published in parts in Shrapnel Issues #1, 2, 3, 5 & the Shrapnel Year One omnibus bonus section.
Shrapnel (The Official BattleTech Magazine) Issue #15	Michael A. Stackpole; Bryan Young; Chris Purnell; Jason Schmetzer; Daniel Isberner; Alan Brundage; James Kirtley; Robin Briseño; Stephen Toropov; Wunji Lau; Eric Salzman; Stephan A. Frabartolo; Ed Stephens; Ken Horner; Johannes Heidler; Alex Fauth; Zac Schwartz; Lorcan Nagle	c.3152 era: ilClan	December 12, 2023 (Catalyst Game Labs, Pulse Publishing)	978-1-63861-147-9	Includes: A Lesson Learned; Voices of the Sphere: Small but Mighty Profitable; The Alexandria Job (By Giles Gammage); Technical Readout: GLD-7R Gladiator; Signing Bonus (By Jaymie Wagner); 11 Good Ways to... Ruin Your Mercenary Company; No Dawn on the Horizon (By David G. Martin); Unit Digest: Outer Reaches Disciples; Unit Digest: Lacadon Vengeance Legion; Dust to Dust (By Michael A. Stackpole); Where the Pen is Mightier than the Sword; Tales of the Strange Bedfellows (By James Hauser); Sea*List Ads: The Almotacen Almanac; El Dorado (By Chris Purnell); Will Schedule It for You: Combined Arms Techs & Astechs; Chaos Campaign Scenario: Rainmaker; Where I Belong (By Tom Leveen); Mercenaries Entertainment Network Digest: June 3152; Technical Readout: The Untold Mauler; Second to None (By Russell Zimmerman); Unit Digest: Blazing Aces; Unit Digest: Halsten's Brigade; Indomitable (By Robin Briseño); Getting Paid in an Uncertain Age; Behind the Stick (By Jason Hansa); Planet Digest: Le Blanc; Lone Wolf and Fox (By Bryan Young), PART 3 OF 4; The Truth about the Bounty Hunter?; Ace Darwin and the Second Try Fiasco (By James Bixby); They Walk Alone: Mercenary Freelancers; Picking the Bones (By Alan Brundage); Unit Digest: Twenty-First Centauri Peregrine Lancers; Silent Plans (By Daniel Isberner); Successor Lord: A Card Game for Three to Five Players; Six Months on the Float (By James Kirtley); Alpha Strike Scenario Track: Embers of the Past; Raptor's Requiem: Canticle (By Lance Scarinci).
Gray Death Rising	Jason Schmetzer	c.3152 era: ilClan	January 18, 2024 (Catalyst Game Labs)		New Gray Death Legion #1-3. Includes: The Price of Duty, Mercenary's Honor, Decision at Pandora.
Shrapnel (The Official BattleTech Magazine) Issue #16	Bryan Young; Craig A. Reed Jr.; Steve P. Vincent; Devin Ramsey; Lance Scarinci; Jennifer Bixby; Chris Wheeler; Mike Miller; Russell Zimmerman; Wunji Lau; Ken Horner; Zac Schwartz; Alex Fauth; Jaymie Wagner; Jamie Kaiju Marriage; David Razi; Tom Stanley; Benjamin Joseph	c.3151 era: ilClan	March 15, 2024 (Catalyst Game Labs, Pulse Publishing)	978-1638611592	Includes: Flushing the Competition; Voices of the Sphere: Terror on the Spacelanes; Riding the Tiger; COM-7T Commando "Blazing Inferno II" (by Lance Scarinci); In Memoriam: Kelly Bonilla; Captains and Loadmasters Symposium; Range War; Chains: Alternate Pilots for Clan Direct Fire Star; Warship Review Quarterly: SLS California; Sacrifice of Angels; Unit Digest: Tarantulas Battalion; Infamous Arms Dealers; Lone Wolf and Fox, PART 4 OF 4; Mystical 'Mechs and Giant Monsters; Planet Digest: Zathras; Of Dust and Dreams; Chaos Campaign Scenario: Rocking Gibraltar; The Pony Express Rides Again; Locust Alone.
BattleTech Pride Anthology 2024	Albert Ross; Ryn Mackie; Jason ‘Po Ding’ Livermore; Jordan Versus; Milla Koponen; Eric Haiko; Jamie Kaiju Marriage; Bryan Young; Kyle ‘Blimp’ Kruso; Robin Briseño; Russell Zimmerman; Griffin D. H. V. Souza; Dana Harris; Michael A. Stackpole	c.3151 (2774 - 3151) era: ilClan	June 1, 2024 (itch.io)	n/a	A free release from itch.io. Includes: White Lies, Bloody Truths (c.3073); Leap of Faith (c.3059); Solaris City Blues (c.3151); Hear Our Voice (c.3148); Pirate Burial (c.3149); The White Giant (c.2992); Be Gay, Do Crimes (c.3132); Better Together (c.3151); We Hardly Knew Ye (c.3151); Sheltering Wing (c.3071); Think About the Future (c.3084); Flinch (c.2582); Corner Cases (c.2774); Official afterword from Michael A. Stackpole; LGB-7Q Longbow C-kit; HPG Outgoing.
Shrapnel (The Official BattleTech Magazine) Issue #17	Russell Zimmerman; Michael J. Ciaravella; Tom Leveen; Mark Hill; Chris Hussey; Devin Ramsey; Craig A. Reed Jr.; Robin Briseño; Matthew Cross; Daniel Isberner; Matt Larson; Wunji Lau; Lorcan Nagle; Eric Salzman; Zac Schwartz; Stephen Toropov		June 12, 2024 (Catalyst Game Labs, Pulse Publishing)	978-1638611615	Includes: Welcome to Solaris; The Markslaughter Files: The Targeted Technician Matter; If You Can't Pay; Mortal Stakes; A Different Battlefield; Oil Can Jones; Violent Inception, PART 1 OF 4; Voice of the Sphere: The Dark Horses; Why do we care about Solaris Gladiators anyway?; The Arena and You: How to Not Die; Never Let an Opposable Thumb got to Waste: Melee Combat and Weapons; The Unknown: Arenas of the Inner Sphere; The Triple Ls: Lyran Lucha Libre Federations of Solaris VII; The Outer Circuit Crown; In the Wolves' Den: Life on Solaris; Technical Readout: TR6 "Wing" Wraith; Stable Digest: Forrest's Fire Stables; Stable Digest: DiNapoli Stables; RPG Adventure: Echoes in the Arena; Chaos Campaign Scenario: Circus 'Mechsimus.
A Skulk of Foxes	Jason Hansa	c.3151 era: ilClan	June 30, 2024 (Catalyst Game Labs)		Fortunes of War #3
In the Shadow of the Dragon	Craig A. Reed Jr.	c.3150 era: Dark Age	July 15, 2024 (Catalyst Game Labs)		
Hounds at Bay	Geoff Swift		July 27, 2024 (Catalyst Game Labs)		Fortunes of War #4
Joy and Ashes	Randall N. Bills; Bryn K. Bills		TBD		The Mercenary Tales #4

== German-language novels ==
Title	Author	Published	ISBN	Synopsis
Phoenix	Peter Heid	2001	ISBN 3-453-18790-3	As they prepare an ambush on Clan forces, mercenaries recount a story from two decades earlier where their unit was betrayed by their employer, and almost destroyed.
Wahnsinn und Methode (Madness and Method)	Michael Diel	2004 (Fantasy Productions GmbH)	ISBN 3-89064-592-5	A Star League unit deployed on an exercise on a periphery planet is caught up in a local intrigue that frames them as war criminals.
Clangründer: Abkehr (Clan Founder: Renunciation)	Randall N. Bills	July 2004 (Fantasy Productions GmbH)	ISBN 3-89064-596-8	Clangründer #1. Book one of The Clangründer Trilogy narrating General Kerensky's exodus and the formation of the Clan culture. This novel was later translated to English and re-worked into the English-language BattleTech novel, Fall from Glory (The Founding of the Clans #1).
Das Schwert und der Dolch (The Sword and the Dagger)	Ardath Mayhar	2004 (Fantasy Productions GmbH)	978-3890644257	A German translation of the English BattleTech novel, The Sword and the Dagger. This novel was not later republished as ebook by Ulisses Spiele.
Über dem Gesetz (Above the Law)	Michael Diel	January 2005 (Fantasy Productions GmbH)	ISBN 3-89064-517-8	A James Bond-style agent thriller where a Star League agent is sent on a snipe hunt for a quartet of supposed murderers (whom he all ends up killing), only to later realize he was given false information about the case, and eventually find out what really happened.
Warrior: En Garde	Michael A. Stackpole	January 2005 (Fantasy Productions GmbH)	978-3890645452	Warrior Trilogie #1. A German translation of the English BattleTech novel, Warrior: En Garde. This novel was not later republished as ebook by Ulisses Spiele.
Warrior: Riposte	Michael A. Stackpole	January 2005 (Fantasy Productions GmbH)	978-3890645469	Warrior Trilogie #2. A German translation of the English BattleTech novel, Warrior: Riposte. This novel was not later republished as ebook by Ulisses Spiele.
Warrior: Coupé	Michael A. Stackpole	January 2005 (Fantasy Productions GmbH)	978-3890645476	Warrior Trilogie #3. A German translation of the English BattleTech novel, Warrior: Coupé. This novel was not later republished as ebook by Ulisses Spiele.
Die Albatros-Akte (The Albatross File)	Reinhold H. Mai	November 2005 (Fantasy Productions GmbH)	ISBN 3-89064-526-7	Declared a fictional story within the BattleTech universe where four Lyran operatives attempt to bring down a rogue Archonet who has obtained secret technology that renders BattleMechs incapacitated.
Clangründer: Traum (Clan Founder: Dream)	Randall N. Bills	February 2006 (Fantasy Productions GmbH)	ISBN 3-89064-597-6	Clangründer #2. Book two of The Clangründer Trilogy. The Exodus Civil War prompts a second exodus from the original exodus, and following his father's death Nicholas Kerensky ruthlessly manipulates his followers to establish the Clans as an artificial ideal culture in his sociopathic vision, and installs himself as their semi-religious leader. The novel ends with him announcing the re-conquest of the Pentagon Worlds by the newly formed Clans, declaring himself their ilKhan. This novel was later translated to English and re-worked into the English-language BattleTech novel, Visions of Rebirth (The Founding of the Clans #2).
Früchte voll Bitterkeit (Fruits (full) of Bitterness)	Hermann Ritter, Erik Schreiber	2006 (Fantasy Productions GmbH / Ulisses Spiele GmbH)	ISBN 3-89064-458-9	In the Free Worlds League a scheme by a sect leader sets a clockwork of crimes in motion with the ultimate goal of capturing a scion of the ruling House Marik, and then setting himself up as his rescuer to gain more influence.
Katze unter Bären (Cat among Bears)	Arous Brocken	2006 (Fantasy Productions GmbH / Ulisses Spiele GmbH)	ISBN 3-89064-490-2	Bear-Zyklus #1. Part 1 of the Bear Cycle. George, a Clan Nova Cat warrior, is captured by Clan Ghost Bear where he becomes a rising star through a combination of luck and skill.
In Ungnade (In Disgrace)	Chris Hartford	April 2006 (Fantasy Productions GmbH / Ulisses Spiele GmbH)	ISBN 3-89064-475-9	Set in the Free Worlds League during the early Star League era (2571–2616), chronicling the rise and fall of Rhean Marik. A re-worked English-language edition of this novel was later released on BattleCorps as, Fall from Grace.
Clangründer: Bande (Clan Founder: Bonds)	Randall N. Bills	never published	ISBN 3-89064-598-4	Clangründer #3. Book three of The Clangründer Trilogy. Announced, but never published in German. This work was later published in English as Land of Dreams (The Founding of the Clans #3). Land of Dreams was previously announced with a working title of Forging of Blood.
En Passant (In Passing)	Michael Diel	2006/2007 (Fantasy Productions GmbH / Ulisses Spiele GmbH)	ISBN 3-89064-479-1	Book one of the unfinished Schattenkrieg (Shadow war) series. Only a small handful of people know that recently deceased Federated Suns First Prince Alexander Davion was in fact murdered. Without the knowledge of her superiors, a high-ranking intelligence officer begins a covert war against the Draconis Combine that spirals out of control and devolves into a space battle between WarShips at the novel's cliffhanger climax. Though announced, a sequel was not published.
Clanwächter (Clan Guard)	Arous Brocken	2007 (Fantasy Productions GmbH / Ulisses Spiele GmbH)	ISBN 978-3-89064-491-2	Bear-Zyklus #2. Part 2 of the Bear Cycle. George is at odds with the Clans' intelligence service who seem to work against the Clans' interests. He is set up to be killed in battle, and is captured by enemy mercenaries.
Mission Kiamba (Mission Kiamba)	Arous Brocken	2007 (Fantasy Productions GmbH / Ulisses Spiele GmbH)	ISBN 978-3-89064-493-6	Bear-Zyklus #3. Part 3 of the Bear Cycle. Stranded on Clan Smoke Jaguar-occupied Kiamba, the mercenaries who captured George incite an uprising on the world (by pretending they were hired by House Kurita to help the inhabitants against the Smoke Jaguar occupation), to cover their attempts to escape the planet.
Duo Infernale (Duo Infernale)	Carolina Möbis	2007 (Fantasy Productions GmbH / Ulisses Spiele GmbH)	ISBN 978-3-89064-498-1	A small mercenary unit is wiped out in a sneak attack. The two survivors learn that they unwittingly guarded a nuclear weapons cache, and embark on an undercover mission to hunt down the perpetrators before the stolen nukes can be used for terrorist attacks.
Karma (Karma)	Bernard Craw	2007 (Fantasy Productions GmbH / Ulisses Spiele GmbH)	ISBN 978-3-89064-454-7	At the dawn of the 4th Succession War, the 3rd Defenders of Andurien raid the Capellan vacuum world of Niomede. Precursor to the Andurien Wars series.
Royal Flush (Royal Flush)	Carolina Möbis	2008 (Fantasy Productions GmbH / Ulisses Spiele GmbH)	ISBN 978-3-89064-620-6	Policical chaos invites a Draconis Combine attack on the breakaway planet McGehee, in an attempt to conquer the now unaligned world before it can join another realm.
Wiege der Basilisken (Cradle of the Basilisks)	Reinhold H. Mai	July 2011 (Ulisses Spiele GmbH)	ISBN 978-3-86889-153-9	Revisiting the protagonists from Die Albatross-Akte for another story declared fictional within the BattleTech universe, Lyran agents try to sabotage a secret Fed Suns project breeding genetically optimized super soldiers (the eponymous Basilisks) in 2838/2839.
Präludium (Prelude)	Bernard Craw	25 January 2012 (Ulisses Spiele GmbH)	ISBN 978-3-86889-164-5	Andurien-Kriege #1. Part 1 of the Andurien Wars series. Episodes depicting the lead-up to the secession of the Duchy of Andurien from the Free Worlds League, and the immediate aftermath.
Zorn (Wrath)	Bernard Craw	11 July 2012 (Ulisses Spiele GmbH)	ISBN 978-3-86889-165-2	Andurien-Kriege #2. Part 2 of the Andurien Wars series. The ill-fated Andurien attack against Grand Base.
Erster Kontrakt (First Contract)	Arous Brocken	7 March 2013 (Ulisses Spiele GmbH)	978-3-86889-262-8	Bear-Zyklus #4. (Bear Cycle #4)
Sturm auf Arc-Royal (Assault on Arc-Royal)	Stefan Burban	26 February 2014 (Ulisses Spiele GmbH)	978-3-86889-378-6	Arc-Royal #1.
Waffengefährten (Brothers-In-Arms)	Arous Brocken	17 April 2014 (Ulisses Spiele GmbH)	978-386889-395-3	Bear-Zyklus #5. (Bear Cycle #5)
Gier (Greed)	Bernard Craw	10 June 2014 (Ulisses Spiele GmbH)	ISBN 978-3-95752-022-7	Andurien-Kriege #3. Part 3 of the Andurien Wars series. The intertwined stories of Emma Centrella of the Magistracy of Canopus and Richard Humphreys of Andurien during their respective realms' joint war against the Capellan Confederation.
Riskante Ziele (Hazardous Objectives)	Arous Brocken	11 March 2015 (Ulisses Spiele GmbH)	978-395752-085-2	Bear-Zyklus #6. (Bear Cycle #6)
Gejagt (Hunted)	Daniel Isberner	13 May 2015 (Ulisses Spiele GmbH)	978-395752-052-4	Silent-Reapers-Zyklus #1. Omnibus-edition of six short stories, separately published as ebooks in 2014. Includes: Tödlicher Kontrakt (Deadly Contract); Auf der Flucht (On the Run); In Blakes Namen (In Blake's Name); Verraten und verkauft (Sold Down the River); Blakes Horror; Allein gegen Alle (Alone Against All).
Die Kanonen von Thunder Rock (The Guns of Thunder Rock)	Bernd Perplies	19 August 8, 2015 (Ulisses Spiele GmbH)	9783957520845	
Der Erbe (The Heir)	Jochen Hahn; Karsten Kaeb	18 November 2015 (Ulisses Spiele GmbH)	9783957520876	Adel vernichtet #1. (Nobility devastates #1)
Kalkuliertes Chaos (Calculated Chaos)	Jochen Hahn; Karsten Kaeb	23 January 2016 (Ulisses Spiele GmbH)	9783957526946	Adel vernichtet #2. (Nobility devastates #2)
Im Schatten der Bestie (In the Beast's Shadow)	Ingo Eikens	20 April 2016 (Ulisses Spiele GmbH)	9783957522962	
Soldat und Spion (Soldier and Spy)	Arous Brocken	28 July 2016 (Ulisses Spiele GmbH)	9783957522979	Griskan-Orlov-Roman #1.
Blutige Jagd (Bloody Hunt)	Stefan Burban	12 October 2016 (Ulisses Spiele GmbH)	9783957522986	Arc-Royal #2.
Sklave und Söldner (Slave and Mercenary)	Arous Brocken	20 April 2017 (Ulisses Spiele GmbH)	9783957524256	Griskan-Orlov-Roman #2.
Verräter und Verteidiger (Traitor and Defender)	Arous Brocken	2 May 2018 (Ulisses Spiele GmbH)	9783957529008	Griskan-Orlov-Roman #3.

== Japanese-language novels ==
Title	Author	Published	ISBN	Synopsis
BattleTech replay 1: Majo tachi no kyouen (BattleTech replay 1: Feast of Witches)	Hiroshi Ootori	1992/12	ISBN 4-8291-4261-8	Book one of The March Hare platoon. This novel based on board game play records. The platoon, which belongs to Paloran Armored Infantry Battalion that employed by Lyran Commonwealth, is rookie mechwarriors, and will sortie after a training period. They rescue lord of planet Aicar III. However, the battalion is defeated by the elite members of the Draconis Combine, and the platoon brought up the rear when retreating from Aicar III.
BattleTech replay 2: Megami tachi no houkou (BattleTech replay 2: Wandering of Goddesses)	Hiroshi Ootori	1993/08	ISBN 4-8291-4271-5	Book two of The March Hare platoon. This novel based on board game play records. The platoon receives an order to go planet Verynew. This planet is home of platoon leader Argenta Ashorika. Their new mission is to protect a high-performance mech that excavated from the remains. However, due to the intrigues, the platoon is driven into a predicament.
Senshi tachi no kaikou (Encounter of Warriors)	Hiroshi Ootori, Shinobu Murakawa	1994/05	ISBN 4-8291-2562-4	Side story of The March Hare platoon. Rookie platoon leader Argenta Ashorika meets veteran petty officer Kirol Bailin.
Shutsugeki! Dokuritsu Guren Tai (Sortie! Independent Rogue platoon)	Kazuhito Kuroda	1995/11	ISBN 4-8291-2657-4	Book one of novel of The Independent Rogue platoon. Yujin Samonji was a platoon leader of a Mech troops employed by the Lyran Commonwealth, and his role was to protect the planet Anywhere. However, Yujin orders his subordinate Rebecca Bayonet to make escape a spy Jeanne Marie Poincaré who has infiltrated Anywhere. Yujin tells Rebecca that he will betray Lyran in order to obtain information about the man who killed his brother.
MechWarrior RPG Replay 1: Madan no Shashu (MechWarrior RPG Replay 1: The Freeshooter)	Kazuhito Kuroda	1995/12	ISBN 4-8291-4309-6	Book one of play records of The Independent Rogue platoon. This novel based on tabletop role-playing game play records. Yujin Samonji leads one of the platoons in the independent troops of the Hermitian Whirlwind Mech Knights, that nicknamed as The Independent Rogue platoon, employed by the Lyran Commonwealth. When the Draconis Combine invades the outlying planet Anywhere, the troops receives orders to go to that planet.
Dasshutsu! Dokuritsu Guren Tai (Break out! Independent Rogue platoon)	Kazuhito Kuroda	1996/07	ISBN 4-8291-2692-2	Book two of novel of The Independent Rogue platoon. Yujin and the Independent Rogue platoon were protecting the president of planet Anywhere and his daughter. The president was planning to hold secret negotiations on a small island where he was vacationing. However, the 29th Rasalhague Regiment, led by Colonel Mori of the Draconis Combine, attacks the island. Mori's target was a valuable old factory hidden in Anywhere.
Gekitou! Dokuritsu Guren Tai (Fierce battle! Independent Rogue platoon)	Kazuhito Kuroda	1996/11	ISBN 4-8291-2716-3	Book three of novel of The Independent Rogue platoon. Surrounded by the 29th Rasalhague Regiment, the Independent Rogue platoon and the mercenary troops to which they belonged could only held up inside to the president's sastle. However, Colonel Mori is unable to achieve his goal, as the valuable old factory is located basement the castle. Mori sets up a high-angle cannon position and attacks the castle. He also defends his base with Yamata no Orochi, which is equipped with a prototype C3 computer. Yujin uses an old underground mine shaft to lead his men and aim to destroy the high-angle cannon position.
MechWarrior RPG Replay 2: Anywhere no Arashi (MechWarrior RPG Replay 2: Storm of Anywhere)	Kazuhito Kuroda	1996/12	ISBN 4-8291-4328-2	Book two of play records of The Independent Rogue platoon. This novel based on tabletop role-playing game play records. A regiment led by Colonel Mori attacks anywhere as reinforcements for the Draconis Combine. The Independent Rogue platoon is held up inside to planet president's castle. Yujin uses Storm Princess, a high-performance variable mech excavated from the castle basement old factory, to buy time. But Mori corners the troops using Yamata no Orochi, which is equipped with a prototype C3 computer.
Kessen! Dokuritsu Guren Tai (Decisive battle! Independent Rogue platoon)	Kazuhito Kuroda	1997/08	ISBN 4-8291-2768-6	Book four of novel of The Independent Rogue platoon. The Independent Brigades were unable to break the siege, but Colonel Mori was also unable to capture the factory. Mori decides to use all his power to attack the castle. Yujin having lost his Mech, he go to the factory in the basement of the castle and unearths a high-performance mech Shadow Saber. The decisive battle between Mori's Yamata no Orochi and Yujin's Shadow Saber begins.
MechWarrior RPG Replay 3: Kyozou tachi no Walts (MechWarrior RPG Replay 3: Waltz of Illusions)	Kazuhito Kuroda	1997/12	ISBN 4-8291-4345-2	Book three of play records of The Independent Rogue platoon. This novel based on tabletop role-playing game play records. The independent troops withdrew, leaving only Yujin's Samonji Independent Platoon on Anywhere. They defend the planet with the allied Berserker Regiment led by Rosa Cary. During the battle with the Draconis Combine, Yujin meets Albert Wiener, who claims to be a historian. The Independent Rogue platoon investigates Rosa and Albert, two people who are acting suspiciously.
MechWarrior RPG Replay 4: Shumatsu heno Countdown (MechWarrior RPG Replay 4: Countdown to The End)	Kazuhito Kuroda	1998/06	ISBN 4-8291-4355-X	Book four of play records of The Independent Rogue platoon. This novel based on tabletop role-playing game play records. A prime old factory in the basement of the castle was stolen by Colonel Mori. To avenge the humiliation of his previous defeat, Mori tells Yujin the jump point he is at. The only ones who can fight are The Independent Rogue platoon and rookile girls platoon of The Guardian Angels. The clock is ticking to Mori escapes, Yujin rushes to the jump point.
