= MechWarrior: Dark Age (novels) =

MechWarrior: Dark Age is the title of an ongoing series of novels set in the BattleTech Universe. The series was created by WizKids and has a companion game MechWarrior: Dark Age (and its successor, MechWarrior: Age of Destruction). The Dark Age series of books is intended as a re-launch of the BattleTech book franchise, to create an easy starting point for new readers.

== Origins ==
With the demise of FASA Corporation in 2001, publishing of the original BattleTech novel series came to an end. When WizKids acquired the rights to the future of the BattleTech Franchise (re-christened as MechWarrior), they approached several of the established BattleTech authors including Randall N. Bills and Michael A. Stackpole to resurrect the novel franchise. WizKids re-launched the book series along with the new miniatures game as MechWarrior: Dark Age.

== Publication history ==
For the series launch in late 2002, Penguin Group was originally contracted to publish the novels as paperbacks under its Roc imprint. The last ROC published novel was released February 2008.

In June 2008, Catalyst Game Labs announced that they had acquired the right to publish novels set in the BattleTech universe, including both new material for both Classic-era BattleTech, as well as MechWarrior. The first Catalyst published MechWarrior novel will be A Bonfire of Worlds by Steven Mohan, Jr, and was originally to be released in November 2008. On November 8, it was announced that the book would delayed to early 2009 to allow for optimal retail positioning. On March 31, 2009, Catalyst again revised the release date of the new novels to be Fall 2009, and also announced that MechWarrior: Dark Age is being renamed to BattleTech: Dark Age to unify the brand under the BattleTech name. Furthermore, Catalyst announced that A Bonfire of Worlds would become available, at no additional cost, to BattleCorps.com subscribers at a rate of one chapter every two weeks. On November 26, 2009, Catalyst officially added A Bonfire of Worlds to its 'Projected First Quarter 2010 Releases', effectively pushing the release back for the 3rd time. Catalyst also released a 'sell sheet' for the novel which includes full details. The release of the sell sheet is the first time full publication details for the novel have become available, and mark a new milestone towards publication of the novel.

== Setting ==
The series is set at least 60 years after the last Classic-era novel (Loren L. Coleman's Endgame) starting in the year 3132 A.D., and although several prominent Classic-era characters appear (most notably, Victor Steiner-Davion), the "Dark Age" revolves around a new dramatis personæ. Although most of the original Classic-era factions appear in some form, many of the novels revolve around The Republic of the Sphere, a new faction centered on Terra (Earth).

== Series ==
See List of MechWarrior: Dark Age Novels

As of June 2008 the MechWarrior: Dark Age series comprises 30 novels, beginning with Michael A. Stackpole's Ghost War. The most recent novel as of June 2008 is Kevin Killiany's To Ride the Chimera. Classic BattleTech authors returning for the new series include Stackpole, Coleman, Randal N. Bills, and Blaine Lee Pardoe.
