= Decision at Thunder Rift =

Novel set in Battletech universe

- Author: William H. Keith Jr.
- Cover artist: Jim Holloway
- Language: English
- Series: BattleTech
- Publisher: Roc Books
- Publication date: June 1986 (original); September 1992 (reprint)
- Pages: 374
- ISBN: 0-451-45184-8
- Followed by: Mercenary's Star

Decision at Thunder Rift is a novel by William H. Keith Jr. published in 1986. it is the first book of the Saga of the Gray Death Legion, and the first novel ever to be published for BattleTech. It tells the story of the young Grayson Death Carlyle and the events that led to the founding of his famous mercenary unit.

== Plot summary ==
In 3024 AD, the planet Trellwan, situated near the Lyran Commonwealth's periphery border, is garrisoned by Carlyle's Commandos under Captain Durant Carlyle whose 20-year-old son Grayson is being trained to become his successor.

Viscount Olin Vogel, a personal emissary of Archon Katrina Steiner, has prepared a pact with the nearby Oberon Confederation by which they will garrison the world, freeing up Carlyle's Commandos for duty elsewhere. The population on Trellwan is incensed about the deal, because Oberon Confederation troops have raided the world in the past, and they are now generally paranoid and hostile towards off-worlders.

A neutral third-party freighter of House Mailai is expected to deliver the Oberon Confederation delegates to finalize the treaty. However, the DropShip unexpectedly opens fire on Captain Carlyle's Phoenix Hawk and deploys BattleMechs. Carlyle is killed when an enemy Marauder destroys his 'Mech. The garrison base near the capital city of Sarghad is simultaneously stormed by commando troops with the aid of Stefan, a Trellwanese traitor. A small number of Carlyle's Commandos escape on their DropShip while most senior personnel are killed; Grayson Carlyle and Viscount Olin Vogel are captured and brought before the enemy war leader. He shoots Vogel in cold blood and proceeds to execute Grayson as well. Grayson is actually only grazed by the bullet to his head, but passes out and is left for dead.

He awakes three days later in the house of Berenir the merchant, a local connection sympathetic to him. Berenir's son was trained as a tech by Carlyle's Commandos and tried to rescue SeniorTech Riviera, but found him dead and rescued the unconscious Grayson instead who was the only one left alive in the hangar.

Briefed on the situation and urged to leave the house because helping him means trouble, Grayson decides to seek out his girlfriend Mara who happens to be the daughter of Defense Minister Stannic. However, at the palace Royal Guards and militia units try to apprehend him. He escapes and meets another off-world fugitive who reveals himself as Renfred Tor, an independent starship captain who had been hired to work for House Mailai by one of their principal traders, Proctor Sinvalie. Tor relates to Grayson how he was assigned to ferry the delegates between Tharkad, Oberon VI and Trellwan for the supposedly secret agreement. On the way here, they were waylaid by unknown forces in Oberon Confederation livery but the raiders summarily killed the delegates aboard Tor's ship, brought BattleMechs aboard and modified the DropShip to carry concealed weapons. Piloting the DropShip to the planet with a gun to his head, Tor realized that he would likely be killed sooner or later and hid, then escaped into Sarghad.

Grayson tries to bring Tor to Berenir's house, but they find it destroyed by the same Marauder that had killed Grayson's father. Tor decides to head for the starport and hire out as a tech, while Grayson retreats to Thunder Rift outside the city with a stolen militia hovercraft skimmer to think the situation over. He returns to Sarghad, only to be caught up in a BattleMech attack against King Jeverid's palace. By a combination of battlefield instincts and pure chance, he ends up commandeering a militia skimmer with a heavy machine gun and uses this to kill the pilot of a Wasp in battle, thereby rallying the defenders and leading them to victory over the attacking pirates. He even manages to corner an overheating Locust in a dead end and forces the pilot (Lori Kalmar) to surrender by means of a shoulder-mounted inferno launcher, thereby capturing the damaged but functional 'Mech.

Following this "Battle of Sarghad", Grayson, reunited with Mara, is hailed as a hero and receives praise and a decoration from King Jeverid in a reception ceremony. Over his objections he is then tasked with creating a specialized anti-'Mech combat formation, the Trellwan Lancers, from the two captured 'Mechs and assorted militia and Guards forces, to fight the pirates still holding the garrison castle.

Competition and bickering between Guard and militia units makes training them difficult, and they also lack the spare parts and tech skills to repair the Wasp. Captive Locust pilot Lori Kalmar reveals that three of the attackers including herself are inexperienced conscripts from the Oberon Confederation, forced to work for the pirates on Trellwan because of circumstances beyond their control. Grayson decides to integrate her into the Trellwan Lancers over the vocal objections of the other soldiers under his command, who do not trust her and also have problems accepting a woman in a command position in Trellwan's male-dominated culture. With her help, the Trellwan Lancers carry out their first mission—capture the other pirate Wasp to salvage for spare parts. The attack succeeds beyond expectations when both the Wasp and a Stinger are captured, and a prisoner camp liberated on the sidelines.

Political pressure soon forces the Trellwan Lancers into action again against Grayson's better judgment. A commando raid is staged against the garrison castle with orders to fatally sabotage the Shadow Hawk undergoing repairs there, but inside the hangar the 'Mech turns out to be fully functional. Only Grayson and four others escape the trap. Following the debacle, the Lancers are redesignated as a company within the Royal Guards and Grayson is relieved of duty.

Shortly afterwards, DropShips from the Draconis Combine arrive carrying Duke Ricol and his entourage, and subdue the pirates who reportedly surrendered immediately. Grayson notes that King Jeverid and militia General Varney are curiously absent, and Guards officers under General Adel have apparently staged a coup. He evades arrest and informs Mara, who draws a gun on him and takes him prisoner; her father Stannic is in on the coup.

Lori Kalmar and Wasp pilot Garik Enzelman, who also defected from the pirates to the Trellwan Lancers, stage a rescue together with militia elements of the Lancers who had gone to ground. They break Grayson out of prison and he leads the ragtag remnant of the Lancers into Thunder Rift to hide for the time being. It is decided that House Steiner must be warned of House Kurita having taken control of the planet, and Renfred Tor's JumpShip is their only chance. Gambling on his crew still being in control of the vessel, Tor leads a commando team into the DropShip while Grayson sneaks into the garrison castle to forge flight orders in the computer. From the computers Grayson learns that the "pirate raid" was a ruse orchestrated by Duke Ricol so that the people of Trellwan would welcome him as their savior. He escapes by commandeering the Shadow Hawk.

Aboard the DropShip, Tor finds that "Proctor Sinvalie", his House Mailai contact, is in truth one Captain Yorunabi of the ISF. Tor takes him captive, recaptures the ship, and takes off while Lancer ground forces stage diversionary raids, providing him with an excuse to take off to avoid the fighting.

Fifty-five hours later, as Tor's DropShip is scheduled to rendezvous with the JumpShip, the Lancers stage another raid against the starport to destroy the ground-based communication array, ensuring the Kurita forces cannot order their own DropShips to intercept it. To this end, they stage a fighting withdrawal into Thunder Rift to draw off the defenders while Grayson in the Shadow Hawk, lying hidden, approaches the array. He is confronted by Singh, the enemy war leader, in his Crusader and the enemy Marauder, but manages to escape after detonating fuel tanks. Tor's party successfully recaptures the JumpShip and jumps out, negating Ricol's advantage of surprise. Seeing how there is nothing to be won on Trellwan for him, the Red Duke leaves the planet.

In the epilogue, Grayson assumes full command of the Trellwan Lancers and reforms them into the Gray Death Legion mercenary unit.

== Publication history ==
Shannon Appelcine stated that by 1986, FASA "began creating a metaplot for Battletech. At first this was just reflected in yearly updates: the Battletech Technical Readout: 3025 (1986) was soon replaced by the Battletech Technical Readout: 3026 (1987). However, FASA had simultaneously begun publishing fiction—starting with William H. Keith Jr.'s Decision at Thunder Rift (1986)."

== See also ==
- List of BattleTech novels

== Reception ==
Simon Farrell reviewed Decision at Thunder Rift for Adventurer magazine and stated that "FASA have succeeded in their joint purpose: to interest readers in Battletech and, more importantly, to entertain them. I would say they have done both, and very well too."

Stephan Wieck reviewed Decision at Thunder Rift in White Wolf #7 (1987), rating it a 7 out of 10 and stated that "I highly recommend reading this book before purchasing the games. It is good reading, and it will give you an idea of the type of action in Battletech gaming."

W. Peter Miller reviewed Decision at Thunder Rift for Different Worlds magazine and stated that "The average adventure game fan will find this a fun read. While it is not the finest piece of adventure fiction ever written, it is far from the worst. But if you are a fan of either Battletech or TV series such as Votoms, Mobile Suit Gundam, or the Americanized Robotech, you will enjoy this book a great deal. One hopes Mr. Keith continues to write. I look forward to his next book."
