= Domination (role-playing game) =

Science-fiction role-playing game

Domination is a near-future science-fiction role-playing game published by StarChilde Publications in 1989.

== Description ==
Domination is a science fiction system set in a near-future in which the Earth has been conquered by the alien Kalotions. The player characters are members of the human resistance. Players select character classes (commando, intelligence agent, pilot, etc.) that determine which skills the character has. The game briefly describes the Kalotions, their technology, and the alien subject races they employ in oppressing the Earthlings. It also covers the major resistance groups, their key leaders, and common modern weapons.

== Publication history ==
Domination was designed by Blaine Pardoe, and published by StarChilde Publications in 1989 as a digest-sized 100-page book.

== Reception ==
In his 1990 book The Complete Guide to Role-Playing Games, game critic Rick Swan found the character generation rules simple, but thought that "the resulting PCs don't always make sense." Swan noted that the game concentrated on combat over role-playing, writing, "there's little help for the referee on setting up an adventure." Swan concluded by giving the game a rating of 2.5 out of 4, saying, "Though designer Blaine Pardoe includes a lengthy background section describing the history and ramifications of the Kalotian invasion, it's hard to tell how it all fits in with the role-playing rules."

In his 1991 book, Heroic Worlds: A History and Guide to Role-Playing Games, Lawrence Schick noted that the "combat rules are simple", but thought that there was not much role-playing material in the game, commenting that the book only included "A brief set of rules by current standards, with the mere outline of a campaign setting."
