= Robert Thurston (novelist) =

American novelist (1936–2021)

- Born: Robert Thurston; October 28, 1936; Lockport, New York, U.S.
- Died: October 20, 2021 (aged 84); Ridgefield Park, New Jersey, U.S.
- Spouse: Rosemary Thurston
- Writing career
- Genres: shared universe, science fiction

Robert Thurston (28 October 1936 – 20 October 2021) was a science fiction author well known for his works in popular shared world settings.

== Career ==
Thurston attended the Clarion Workshop at Clarion State College, Pennsylvania in 1968, instructed by several major sci-fi writers (Kate Wilhelm, Damon Knight, Fritz Leiber, and Harlan Ellison, among others). He did graduate studies in English literature at the University of Buffalo and was a veteran of the United States Army. He was awarded first prize for his short story "Set of Wheels," which was included, with two other short stories ("Anaconda" and "The Last Desperate Hour") in the anthology Clarion, edited by the workshop's founder, Robin Scott Wilson, in 1971.

FASA signed an agreement with Roc Publishing in 1991 that lasted for 10 years and started a long line of publication with Robert Thurston's Legend of the Jade Phoenix series for Battletech (1991).

Thurston is best known for his Clan Jade Falcon novels of the BattleTech universe and the novelizations of the original Battlestar Galactica television series.

He had worked at New Jersey City University's Opportunity Scholarship Program as Coordinator of Supplemental Instruction, since 1992.

== Bibliography ==
=== Novels ===
- Thurston, Robert (1978). Alicia II. Berkley.
- Set of Wheels. New York: Berkley 1983
- Q Colony. Berkley, 1985
- For the Silverfish (Rugger No. 1). New York: Avon Books, 1985

Battlestar Galactica series

- Battlestar Galactica (with Glen A. Larson) 1978
- The Cylon Death Machine (with Glen A. Larson) 1979
- The Tombs of Kobol (with Glen A. Larson) 1979
- The Young Warriors (with Glen A. Larson) 1980
- The Nightmare Machine (with Glen A. Larson) 1985
- Die, Chameleon! (with Glen A. Larson) 1986
- Apollo's War (with Glen A. Larson) 1987
- Surrender the Galactica! (with Glen A. Larson) 1988

BattleTech series

- Way of the Clans (1991)
- Bloodname (1991)
- Falcon Guard (1991)
- I Am Jade Falcon (1995)
- Freebirth (1998)
- Falcon Rising (1999)

Isaac Asimov's Robot City – Robots and Aliens series

- Isaac Asimov's Robot City: Robots and Aliens 3: Intruder. Ace, 1990
- Isaac Asimov's Robots and Aliens 2: Intruder (Book 3), Alliance (Book 4 by Jerry Oltion). I Books, 2002

Novelizations

- Robot Jox: The Novel. Based on a screenplay by Joe Haldeman and Dennis Paoli. New York: Avon Books, 1989
- 1492: The Conquest of Paradise. London; New York: Penguin Books, 1992

=== Short fiction ===
Stories

Title	Year	First published	Reprinted/collected	Notes
Slipshod, at the edge of the universe	2001	Thurston, Robert (March 2001). "Slipshod, at the edge of the universe". F&SF. 100 (3): 114–122.		

- "Wheels." Clarion ed. Robin Scott Wilson. Berkeley: Signet, 1971
- "Anaconda." Clarion ed. Robin Scott Wilson. Berkeley: Signet, 1971
- "The Last Desperate Hour." Clarion ed. Robin Scott Wilson. Berkeley: Signet, 1971
- "Get FDR!" Clarion II ed. Robin Scott Wilson. Berkeley: Signet, 1972
- "The Good Life." Clarion II ed. Robin Scott Wilson. Berkeley: Signet, 1972
- "Punchline." Clarion II ed. Robin Scott Wilson. Berkeley: Signet, 1972
- "Good-Bye Shelley, Shirley, Charlotte, Charlene." Orbit 11 ed. Damon Knight. New York: Putnam, 1972
- "The Hippie-Dip File." Fantasy & Science Fiction March 1972 and Social Problems Through Science Fiction ed. Martin H. Greenberg, John W. Milstead, Joseph D. Olander & Patricia S. Warrick. New York: St. Martin's, 1975
- "She/Her." Infinity #5 ed. Robert Hoskins. Lancer, 1973
- "Up Against the Wall." Amazing August 1973 and School and Society Through Science Fiction ed. Joseph D. Olander, Martin H. Greenberg & Patricia Warrick. Chicago: Rand McNally College Publishing, 1974
- "Soundtrack: The Making of a Thoroughbred." Fantastic Vol. 23 no. 4, May 1974
- "Searching the Ruins." Amazing August 1974
- "The Haunted Writing Manual." Fantastic October 1975
- "Theodora and Theodora." New Dimensions: Science Fiction Number 5. New York: Harper & Row, 1975
- "Groups." Fantastic February 1976
- "If That's Paradise, Toss Me an Apple." Amazing Stories March 1976
- "Parker Frightened on a Tightrope." Fantastic Sword & Sorcery and Fantasy Stories Vol. 25 no. 5 November 1976
- "Aliens." Fantasy & Science Fiction Vol. 51 no. 6 December 1976
- "The Mars Ship." Fantasy & Science Fiction Vol. 52 no. 6 June 1977
- "The Bulldog Nutcracker." Chrysalis Vol. 2. Ed. Roy Torgeson. New York: Zebra Books, 1978
- "Seedplanter." Chrysalis Vol. 3. Ed. Roy Torgeson. New York: Zebra Books, 1978
- "What Johnny Did on His Summer Vacation." (with Joe W. Haldeman). Rod Serling's Other Worlds ed. Rod Serling. Bantam, 1978.
- "The Wanda Lake Number." Analog Science Fiction/Science Fact Jan. 1979 and Light Years and Dark Ed. Michael Bishop. Berkly 1984
- "Alternate 51: Bliss." The Berkeley Showcase: New Writings in Science Fiction and Fantasy Vol. 4. Ed. Victoria Schochet & John W. Silbersack. New York: Berkeley Books, July 1981
- "The Fire at Sarah Siddons." Isaac Asimov's Science Fiction Magazine Vol. 8 no. 8 August 1984
- "Was That House There Yesterday?" Universe 16 Ed. Terry Carr. New York: Doubleday & Co., 1986
- "The World's Light Heavyweight Champion in Nineteen Twenty-Something" Fantasy & Science Fiction Vol. 100 no. 6 June 2001
- "Who Wants to Live Forever?" Fantasy & Science Fiction Vol. 103 no.2 August 2002
- "Zeroing In." The Corps: Battlecorps Anthology Vol. 1. Catalyst Game Labs, 2008
- "Face in the Viewport." BattleTech: 25 Years of Art and Fiction. Catalyst Game Labs, 2009

Novellas

- "Kingmakers." New Voices in Science Fiction. ed. George R.R. Martin. 1977
- "Vibrations." Chrysalis 4. Ed. Roy Torgeson.New York: Zebra Books, 1979
- "The Oonaa Woman." The Berkeley Showcase: New Writings in Science Fiction and Fantasy Vol. 3. Ed. Victoria Schochet & John W. Silbersack. New York: Berkeley Books, January 1981

Novelettes;

- "Carolyn's Laughter." Fantasy & Science Fiction Vol. 42 no. 1 1972
- "Dream by Number." Fantasy & Science Fiction Vol. 49 no. 3 September 1975
- "Marchplateau." Worlds of If Science Fiction, Fantasy, and Fact Sept-Nov. 1986
- "I.D.I.D." Fantasy & Science Fiction Vol. 108 no. 5 May 2005
- "One Magic Ring, Used." Fantastic Vol. 25 no. 3 May 1976
- "Under Siege." Fantasy & Science Fiction Vol. 47 no. 1 July 1974
- "Wheels Westward." Cosmos Vol. 1 no. 4 November 1977
- "Nobody Like Josh." Asimov's Science Fiction #486, July 2016

=== Introductions and other contributions ===
- "Introduction." Big Time. Fritz Leiber. Gregg Press, 1976
- "Introduction." Dark Universe. Daniel F. Galouye. Gregg Press, 1976
- "Introduction." Driftglass. Samuel R. Delany. Gregg Press, 1977
- "Introduction." The Early Science Fiction Stories of Thomas M. Disch. Gregg Press, 1977
- "Introduction." Today We Choose Faces. Roger Zelazny. Gregg Press, 1978
- "Introduction." The Game Players of Titan. Philip K. Dick. Gregg Press, 1979
- "Afterword." The Fantasies of Harlan Ellison. Gregg Press, 1979
