= Blaine Pardoe =

American military historian and writer

- Born: 6 November 1962 (age 63); Newport News, Virginia
- Education: Central Michigan University
- Occupations: Writer, author
- Writing career
- Genres: Science fiction; true crime; thriller; military history
- Website: www.blainepardoe.com/index.html

Blaine Lee Pardoe is an American author and military historian, known primarily for writing the BattleTech and MechWarrior: Dark Age series of science fiction books.

== Personal life ==
Pardoe was born in Newport News, Virginia, in 1962 and raised in Battle Creek, Michigan. He attended Central Michigan University, where he wrote for the school newspaper. After graduating with a bachelor's degree in business management, he worked for Michigan auto companies Ford, GM, and Chrysler. He began writing for sci-fi games and reference books and moved back to Virginia. For 25 years he worked in IT Services at Ernst & Young LLP before retiring to write full time. Pardoe lives in Spotsylvania, Virginia.

== Career ==
Pardoe designed the Domination role-playing game, which was published by StarChilde Publications in 1989. He was a writer for BattleTech's fiction. His best-known book in the MechWarrior: Dark Age line was Surrender Your Dreams. Hour of the Wolf, written by Pardoe, is Catalyst Game Lab's bestselling BattleTech novel. He contributed stories to the online pay-to-read fiction website Battlecorps.

Pardoe has been a guest speaker at the U.S. National Archives, the U.S. Navy Museum, the Smithsonian, the Mariner's Museum, and the New York Military Affairs Symposium. He won the Historical Society of Michigan's State History Award in 2011 and the Silver Medal from the Military Writer's Society of America the same year for his book Lost Eagles about Frederick Zinn of the Lafayette Flying Corps. His books have appeared on several bestseller lists, including the New York Times Murder and Mayhem list in October 2014, on Amazon.com, and in numerous newspapers.

On July 30, 2022, Catalyst Game Labs announced they were suspending publication of new works by Pardoe "primarily due to Mr. Pardoe’s online activities, which do not align with Catalyst’s publishing vision." In an article on the website American Greatness, Pardoe wrote: "I found myself canceled for voicing my conservative beliefs".

In the last few years, Pardoe has been the primary writer for another Mecha series, Land&Sea. He and comic book legend Mike Barron have written a bestselling political thriller series called Tenure. His series, Blue Dawn has been widely acclaimed as a conservative political thriller/alternate history series. (Heavy Citation needed.)
