= Ilsa J. Bick =

American novelist

- Occupations: Short story person, novelist
- Writing career
- Period: 1999–present
- Subjects: Sci-fi, paranormal mystery, dystopian thriller
- Website: www.ilsajbick.com

Ilsa J. Bick is an American author of short stories, e-books and novels. She has written for several long-running science fiction series, most notably Star Trek, Battletech, and Mechwarrior: Dark Age. She's taken both Grand and Second Prize in the Strange New Worlds anthology series (1999 and 2001, respectively), while her story, "The Quality of Wetness," took Second Prize in the prestigious Writers of the Future contest in 2000. Her first Star Trek novel, Well of Souls, was a 2003 Barnes & Noble bestseller.

== Biography ==
Before she became an author, Bick was a child/adolescent and forensic psychiatrist. She also holds a degree in literature and film studies, and has presented and written widely on applied psychoanalysis and film.

Her original stories have been featured in numerous anthologies, magazines, and online venues. "The Key," a supernatural murder-mystery about the Holocaust and reincarnation, was named "distinguished" in The Best American Mystery Stories, 2005 (edited by Joyce Carol Oates), and a sequel, "Second Sight," appeared in Crimespells (2003) and was named to the 2010 Year's Best Science Fiction and Fantasy recommended reads.

Bick's first YA novel, Draw the Dark (Carolrhoda Lab, 2010), is a paranormal mystery that was awarded the 2011 Westchester Fiction Award. Ashes, the first volume in her dystopian thriller trilogy, was released from Egmont USA in September 2011.

Bick has also contributed several novels in Elle James's Brotherhood Protectors World, including the four-part series, Soldier's Heart, and the John Worthy series, What is Lost, What is Found,and What Remains.

She currently lives in London.

== Select bibliography ==
=== YA novels ===
- Draw the Dark (Publisher: Carolrhoda Lab, October 2010)
- Ashes: Vol. I of the ASHES Trilogy (Publisher: Egmont USA, September 2011)
- Drowning Instinct (Publisher: Carolrhoda Lab, February 2012)
- Shadows: Vol. II of the ASHES Trilogy (Publisher: Egmont USA, September 2012)
- Sin-Eater's Confession (Publisher: Carolrhoda Lab; February 2013)
- Monsters: Vol. III of the ASHES Trilogy (Publisher: Egmont USA, September 2013)
- White Space (Publisher: Egmont USA, forthcoming)

==== Ashes Trilogy ====
- Ashes (2011)
- Shadows (2012)
- Monsters (2013)

=== Star Trek ===
- Strange New Worlds II (May 1999)
  - "A Ribbon for Rosie" (Grand Prize winner)
- Strange New Worlds IV (May 2001)
  - "Shadows, in the Dark" (Second Prize winner)
- Star Trek: New Frontier: No Limits (October 2003)
  - "Alice, on the Edge of Night"
- Star Trek: The Lost Era #6: Well of Souls (November 2003)
- Starfleet Corps of Engineers
  - #51: Lost Time (April 2005)
  - #55: Wounds, Book 1 (August 2005)
  - #56: Wounds, Book 2 (October 2005)
  - Star Trek: Corps of Engineers: Ghost (June 2007)
  - Star Trek: SCE: Wounds (October 2008)
- Star Trek: Voyager: Distant Shores (November 2005)
  - "Bottomless"

=== BattleTech stories and novellas on Battlecorps.com ===
- Damage Control (August 2004)
- Surkai (September 2004)
- Memories of Fire and Ice at the Edge of the World (October 2004)
- Break-Away (November 2004)
- The Gauntlet, Book I (weekly installments, March 1 – April 5, 2006)
- The Gauntlet, Book II (weekly installments, May 9 – June 6, 2006)

=== MechWarrior: Dark Age ===
- #16: Daughter of the Dragon (June 2005)
- #19: Blood Avatar (December 2005)
- #24: Dragon Rising (February 2007)
