= James D. Long =

James (Jim) D. Long is a former member of the High Council of B'nei Noah, author, director, co-owner/operator of Lightcatcher Productions and Lightcatcher Books and former radio personality.

== Radio ==
Born in December 1948 in Swinton, Missouri, Long began his broadcast career as a disc jockey for his hometown radio station before graduating from High School. During the next 10 years, he worked as a journalist and program director in a number of cities including Houston and Dallas.

== Middle East adventures ==
He relocated to Dallas in the 1990s and returned to broadcasting as Program Director of KGBS-Talk Radio. There, he interviewed Vendyl Jones and began working with the Vendyl Jones Research Institutes. He wrote and directed two documentaries, Digging Up the Future and Return to Gilgal, and participated in several archaeological excavations in the Middle East, documenting them on film and video.

Long and his wife, Carol, met in Dallas, Texas and were later married in Israel. They later founded Lightcatcher, a publishing and film production company.

== Film ==
Long co-produced Search For the Ark of the Covenant for Fox-Lorber's Quest Series, which aired on the BBC and Dutch Television. While working on their own projects, James and Carol, shot on location in Israel, Egypt, Jordan and England. Their footage was later featured in Giants: The Myth & the Mystery, seen on The Learning Channel; the History Channel mini-series Gold!; Pax Television's Encounters with the Unexplained, Discovery Channel International's Secrets of the Holy Land and Science of the Bible, a National Geographic television series.

Under the Lightcatcher banner, Long wrote and directed On the Wings of Ezekiel and Riddle of the Exodus. The latter documentary is based on his book of the same name and offers evidence for the biblical Exodus based on the archaeological records of Egypt and ancient Jewish sources. Following the release of the book and DVD version, James was invited to lecture on the subject of the Exodus in venues across the US, as well as England, Israel and Canada.

== High Council of B'nei Noah ==
Long and nine other men gathered in Israel to form the High Council of B'nei Noah on January 10, 2006. Long was appointed as the council's speaker and public relations expert. James served in that capacity until his resignation from the council in January 2007.

== Other sources ==
- Simmons, Rabbi Shraga. Seven Questions - The Noahide. The amazing journey of Jim Long, an observant Noachide ,
- Kress, Michael. The Seven Laws of Noah and the Non-Jews who Follow Them , Moment Magazine
- HaLevi, Ezra. Sanhedrin Recognizes Council to Teach Humanity Laws of Noah , Israel National News
- "His Name is Jim Long", Tamar Yonah Interview,, Israel National Radio
- Jim Long Interview on Coast to Coast with George Noory: “Exodus Revisited” Sunday, March 31, 2002,
- Interview with Jim Long at Monaco Charity Film Festival,
- Listing for Jim Long on Internet Movie Database,
