= 2009 Origins Award winners =

The following are the winners of the 36th annual (2009) Origins Award, presented at Origins 2010.

Category	Winner	Company	Designer(s)
Best Historical Miniature Figure or Line	Wings of War: Albatross D. III	Nexus Editrice	
Best Historical Miniature Game Rules Supplement	Flames of War: North Africa	Battlefront Miniatures, LTD	
Best Historical Miniature Game Rules	Wings of War: WWII, Deluxe Edition	Nexus Editrice	Andrea Angiolino, Pier Glorgio Paglia
Best Historical Board Game	Conflict of Heroes: Storms of Steel!	Academy Games	Uwe Eickert, John Hill, Dana Lombardy
Best Game-Related Book	BattleTech: 25 Years of Art & Fiction	Catalyst Game Labs	Randall N. Bills, Jason Schmetzer & Matt Heerdt
Best Game Accessory	Knights of the Dinner Table	Kenzer & Company	Jolly R. Blackburn
Best Miniature Figure or Line	Marvel HeroClix Hammer of Thor Expansion	WizKids	Eric Englehard, Kelly Bonilla, Jake Theis, James Szubski
Best Miniature Game Rules	BattleTech: Strategic Operations	Catalyst Game Labs	Herbert A. Beas II, Randall N. Bills
Best Role Playing Game Supplement	Big Damn Heroes Handbook	Margaret Weis Productions	Cam Banks, Jennifer Brozek, Jim Davenport, Jason Durall, Tony Lee, Nathon Rockwood, Clark Valentine
Best Role Playing Game	Eclipse Phase	Catalyst Game Labs & Posthuman Studios	Rob Boyle, Brian Cross
Best Children's, Family or Party Game	Are You The Traitor?	Looney Labs	Andrew Looney
Best Traditional Card Game	Poo	Catalyst Game Labs	Matthew Grau
Best Board Game	Space Hulk	Games Workshop	
