= 2010 ENnie Award winners =

- Awarded for: Best role-playing games of previous year
- Country: United Kingdom & United States
- Presented by: Gen Con
- First award: 2001
- Website: Archive of 2010 ENNIE Awards

The following are the winners of the 10th annual ENnie Awards, held in 2010:

== List of winners ==
Category	Gold Winner	Silver Winner
Best Cover Art	Pathfinder Bestiary, Paizo Publishing	Eclipse Phase, Catalyst Game Labs/Posthuman Studios
Best Interior Art	Pathfinder Core Rulebook, Paizo Publishing	Shadowrun 20th Anniversary, Catalyst Game Labs
Best Cartography	Pathfinder City Map Folio, Paizo Publishing	Aces & Eight: Judas Crossing, Kenzer & Company
Best Writing	Eclipse Phase, Catalyst Game Labs/Posthuman Studios	Victoriana 2nd Ed, Cubicle 7 Entertainment
Best Production Values	Pathfinder Core Rulebook, Paizo Publishing	Shadowrun 20th Anniversary, Catalyst Game Labs
Best Rules	Diaspora, VSCA	Heroes 6th Edition, Hero Games
Best Adventure	Pathfinder #31: Stolen Land, Paizo Publishing	Trail of Cthulhu: Armitage Files, Pelgrane Press
Best Monster or Adversary	Pathfinder Bestiary, Paizo Publishing	Pathfinder: Classic Horrors Revisited, Paizo Publishing
Best Setting	Day After Ragnarok Atomic Overmind Press	Rome: Life and Death of the Republic Cubicle 7 Entertainment
Best Supplement	Mysteries of the Hollow Earth, Exile Games Studio	Player's Handbook 3, Wizards of the Coast
Best Aid or Accessory	Pathfinder GM Screen, Paizo Publishing	Gaming Paper, Gaming Paper
Best Miniatures Products	D&D Minis, Wizards of the Coast	Gaming Paper, Gaming Paper
Best RPG Related Product	Cthulhu 101, Atomic Overmind Press	Battletech: 25 Years of Art and Fiction, Catalyst Game Labs
Best Electronic Book	The Great City Player’s Guide, 0One Games	The Devil We Know, Paizo Publishing
Best Free Product	Advanced Players Guide Playtest, Paizo Publishing	Lady Blackbird, one seven design
Best Website	Obsidian Portal	d20PFSRD.com
Best Podcast	Atomic Array	All Games Considered
Best Blog	Kobold Quarterly	Gnome Stew
Best Game	Pathfinder, Paizo Publishing	Shadowrun 20th Anniversary, Catalyst Game Labs
Product of the Year	Pathfinder, Paizo Publishing	Eclipse Phase, Catalyst Game Labs/Posthuman Studios
Fan Award for Best Publisher	Paizo Publishing	Fantasy Flight Games
