= Air wargaming =

Tabletop game with aerial elements

Air wargaming, like naval wargaming, is a niche specialism within the wider miniatures wargaming hobby. Due to the relatively short time over which aerial combat has developed air wargaming periods tend to break down into three broad periods:

- World War I – from the earliest air combat to the 1920s
- World War II – 1930s to the early 1950s
- "Modern" – the missile age

To this can be added science fiction and "alternate history" such as the various incarnations of Crimson Skies or Victorian Science Fiction such as Aeronef.

Air wargaming is served by a specialist wargames society, AirWarSoc, which was formed by Steve Blease (founder of the Society of Fantasy and Science Fiction Wargamers); AirWarSoc currently exists as an online entity. The development of military flight occurred during the period covered by the Society of Twentieth Century Wargamers and air wargaming articles appear frequently in its quarterly Journal.

== Board games ==
=== WW1 ===
- Ace of Aces (Flying Buffalo, Inc.) combat game that simulates a dogfight between World War I aircraft using two booklets
- Age of Dogfights: WWI (Forsage Games)
- Blue Max
- Dawn Patrol (TSR)
- Flying Circus (Simulations Publications Inc.)
- Knights of the Air (Avalon Hill)
- Richthofen's War (Avalon Hill)
- Winged Victory (WBS Games)
- Wings (Yaquinto, Excalibre)
- Wings of War: Dawn of War (Fantasy Flight Games)

=== WW2 ===
- Achtung Spitfire – Fighting Wings Series – (Clash of Arms)
- Air Force and the Dauntless expansion pack (Avalon Hill)
- B-17: Queen of the Skies (Avalon Hill) solitaire game
- Down in Flames (GMT)
- Memoir '44: Air Pack and Memoir '44: New Flight Plan (Days of Wonder)
- Over the Reich – Fighting Wings Series – (Clash of Arms)
- Skies Above the Reich GMT Games
- Spitfire (Simulations Publications Inc.)
- Whistling Death – Fighting Wings Series – (Clash of Arms)
- Wing Leader GMT Games
- Wings of War: Famous Aces (Fantasy Flight Games)

=== Modern ===
- Air Scarmush (Christophe W. Roth)
- Air Superiority and the expansion packs Air Strike, Desert Falcon and Eagle of the Gulf (GDW)
- Air War (Simulations Publications Inc.)
- Downtown (GMT)
- Elusive Victory (GMT)
- Flight Leader (Avalon Hill)
- Fox One (One Small Step) card game of modern jet fighter combat
- Foxbats & Phantoms (Simulations Publications Inc.)
- Hornet Leader (DVG) Solitaire game
- Red Storm (GMT)
- Rolling Thunder
- The Speed of Heat (Clash of Arms)
- Thunderbolt/Apache Leader (DVG) Solitaire game

=== Science fiction and fantasy ===
- Interceptor (Fasa) Far Future fighter level combat in the Renegade legion setting
- Mayday (GDW) space combat in the Traveller's universe
- Star Warriors a spinoff of the West End Games' Star Wars role-playing game.

== Miniatures rules ==
=== WW1 ===
- Air War 1918 (Wessex Games)
- Algernon Pulls It Off (TooFatLardies)
- Blue Max (Miniatures Edition)
- Dogfight! (Ostfront Publishing) WW1 Air Combat game for large scale battles using 1/600 or 1/144 miniatures
- Stringbags (A&A Game Engineering)
- Wings of War Miniatures (Fantasy Flight Games)
- In Clouds of Glory (Free to download) ICOG Rules

=== WW2 ===
- Air Battles in Miniature: War-gamers' Guide to Aerial Combat, 1939-45 by Mike Spick – Highly recommended to any air wargamer.
- Bag the Hun (TooFatLardies)
- Blazing Skies (AtkinsWargames) Pilot Scale duels 600+ Aircraft covered 1932-1955
- Blood Red Skies (Warlord Games)
- Blue Sky series (Blue Sky Enterprises) – currently four modules, Red Sun (Early Far East), Red Star (Eastern Front), White Star (US Daylight Raids), Blue Sea (Mediterranean), and a fifth, Black Cross (Early Western Europe), is in production.
- Check Your 6! (Scott Fisher/Skirmish Campaigns)
- Duel of Eagles (QRF)
- FLAC: Fast Large Air Combat – a free rule set that is easy to learn and entertaining to play.
- Instant Bandits! (Nigel Lancaster)
- Lacquered Coffins (Ostfront Publishing)
- Mustangs and Messerschmitts (Rocky Russo)-- dogfights in 3D using 1/72 scale model aircraft.
- Scramble! and the Angels 15 supplement (A&A Game Engineering)
- Sturmovik Commander (Marcin Gerkowicz) – free ruleset, inspired by Forgeworld's Aeronautica Imperialis. It has modular construction, which allows to expand it by optional rules or squadron lists.
- Air Raid 36/46 - Easy ruleset, quick to play, highly detailed 1/200 metal miniatures.

=== Modern ===
- Air War C21 (Wessex Games)
- Bandits 2! (Sunray42 – Private Rule set contact either Vandering Press in UK, or Wargames Vault for download here)
- Birds of Prey (Ad Astra Games)
- Clash of Sabres (QRF)
- Fox Two (A&A Game Engineering)
- Fox Two Reheat (A & A Game Engineering)
- Instant Thunder! (Nigel Lancaster)
- Lethal Skies (Talion Games) A game of Modern Air Combat
- Mig Killers (Gamescience 1977 – Out of Print)
- Missile Threat (Ostfront Publishing)

=== Science fiction and fantasy ===
- 5150: Fighter Command (Two Hour Wargames) space combat in the THW's 5150 Universe
- Aeronautica Imperialis (Forge World) Warhammer 40k themed aerial combat
- Aeronef (Wessex Games) Victorian Science Fiction
- Battlestar Galactica - Starship Battles (Ares) Fighter combat in the Battlestar Galactica universe
- Crimson Skies (Fasa) alternate history air combat in a fragment America
- Hard Vacuum (Fat Messiah) World War II rocket combat
- Leviathan (Fasa) Far Future capital ship combat in the Renegade legion setting
- Mercenary Air Squadron (VBAM Games)
- Star Wars: Silent Death (Online rules) "Silent Death" rules for the Star Wars universe
- Star Wars: X-Wing Miniatures (Fantasy Flight Games).

== Online rules ==
As with most wargaming genres and periods there are a large number of free air wargaming rules available on the internet. Some of these can be found on the Air Wargames Online website.

A Blue Max online website is found at www.youplay.it
