= Adam Jury =

Canadian game designer

Adam Jury is a Canadian game designer and graphic designer working in the hobby games industry. He is the co-founder of Posthuman Studios.

== Career ==
Adam Jury is a graphic designer. He began his career as a freelance writer working with FASA Corporation on the Shadowrun roleplaying game in 2000, and moved to a design and layout role when he began working for Guardians of Order (GoO) full-time in 2002.

Jury took over working on the licensed Big Eyes, Small Mouth supplements in 2002 from Jeff Mackintosh, and Uresia: Grave of Heaven (2003) is one of the earlier books that included art from Jury. In 2004, when GoO began scaling down their operations and output, Jury helped GoO finish and publish some of their last products while returning to work as a freelancer with other publishers

While working as a graphic designer at Catalyst Game Labs, Jury created the game design studio Posthuman Studios in 2009 with Rob Boyle and Shadowrun writer Brian Cross. He resigned from Catalyst in March 2010.

Jury works primarily with FanPro on Shadowrun and Classic BattleTech (a revised edition of the classic miniatures game), as well as pursuing a number of original projects.

== Awards ==
Jury has worked on several award-winning or nominated products, including the following:

- Dreaming Cities - nominated for an ENnie Award in 2005
- A Game of Thrones RPG - nominated for ENnie Awards in multiple categories in 2006; Runner-Up for Best Game award.
- Shadowrun, Fourth Edition - winner of ENnie Awards for Best Game and Best Rules in 2006.

Jury was the gaming guest of honor at MechaCon in July 2009.

== Notable works ==
- Eclipse Phase, an RPG about transhumanism and existential horror in a post apocalyptic future.
- A Game of Thrones RPG
- Big Eyes, Small Mouth 3rd edition
- Dreaming Cities
- Ex Machina RPG
- Shadowrun, Fourth Edition
- Battletech, Total Warfare
- Tri-Stat dX
