= Fight in the Skies =

Board game

- Fight in the Skies box cover Fight in the Skies (1975) by TSR, Inc.
- Players: 2 to 12
- Setup time: 15 minutes
- Playing time: 45 minutes to 2 hours
- Chance: Medium
- Skills: Tactics, Strategy

Fight In The Skies, also known as Dawn Patrol, is a board wargame first self-published by creator Mike Carr in 1966, then published by Guidon Games in 1972 and TSR in 1975. The game simulates World War I style air combat, and is the only game to appear on the event schedule of every Gen Con convention since Gen Con I.

== Description ==
Fight in the Skies is a game for 2–12 players in which each player controls a World War I aircraft. Players use a grid and cardboard counters to represent the locations of their planes. Since air combat is three dimensional, each player uses a log to keep track of the altitude of their plane. At the end of each turn, a player may fire on any enemy planes within their sights. A six-sided die is rolled to determine if a hit is made, and if necessary a second die is rolled to determine the amount of damage.

If a player comes up behind an enemy plane, they may elect to tail the enemy. The tailed player tries to break the pursuit: each turn they secretly select one of 16 possible maneuvers. They may for example climb, dive, turn, bank, loop, stall, barrel roll, go into a tail spin, or perform a falling leaf. The tailing player, meanwhile, is allowed to select some of the possible maneuvers for themself, the exact number depending upon their distance from the enemy. The tailed player then performs their maneuver, and if the tailing player has the maneuver in their selected list, they can duplicate the maneuver and stay on the enemy's tail.

In addition to detailed combat mechanics, performance statistics for the 28 Allied and 30 German/Austrian aircraft in use during 1917 and 1918 are provided. The game includes historical notes and an extensive bibliography.

== Publication history ==
Mike Carr began designing Fight in the Skies after watching the movie The Blue Max. Carr self-published the game in 1966, distributing copies among fellow members of the International Federation of Wargamers. It was the first tactical air combat game, and the first air combat game to deal with World War I.The game was played at the first Gen Con game convention in Lake Geneva in 1968, and continued to be played at Gen Con in following years. Carr also self-published a second and third edition.

In 1972, Guidon Games published the fourth edition. TSR formed a board games division in 1975, and the 5th edition of Fight in the Skies was their first product. TSR published all subsequent editions of the game.

When TSR produced the 7th edition in 1982, they renamed the game Dawn Patrol and included a four-page folder that explained how the game could be converted to a role-playing game. In addition, the formerly monochromatic counters were printed in full color, and the map, formerly a featureless square grid, was upgraded to show full color terrain features. This edition had a print run of 20,000 copies, the largest in the history of the game.

As noted in 40 Years of Gen Con, "Only one game has been played every year at Gen Con since 1968 — the Dawn Patrol board game, originally entitled Fight in the Skies by Mike Carr."

== Reception ==
In Issue 5 The Wargamer, Jim Hind commented, "The system for recording damage is much more detailed than in rival games such as Richthofen's War and Flying Circus." Hind concluded, "If you don't like dice-throwing, you will steer clear of this one. Myself, I'm prepared to put up with it for the sake of the enormous amount of historical color which the game contains."

In The Guide to Simulations/Games for Education and Training, Martin Campion noted that the square grid "distorts movement slightly" and warned that the game does not come with scenarios, meaning, "The situations have to be constructed by the players."

In a retrospective review in Issue 9 of Simulacrum, Joe Scoleri called the game "ground breaking," noting it was the first tactical aerial combat game, and the first to be set in World War I. He also pointed out that the rules for the entertaining game were only seven pages long.

Games chose Dawn Patrol for inclusion in its "Top 100 Games of 1982", calling the latest edition "handsome", and saying, "Maneuvering to fire at your opponent's weakest point may remind you of three-dimensional chess, but the Basic Game is not hard to learn. Optional rules add such considerations as weather, ground attacks, and rescuing downed pilots."

Dawn Patrol was chosen for inclusion in the 2007 book Hobby Games: The 100 Best. Game designer Skip Williams commented on the choice, saying, "Board games featuring World War I air combat have been popular among game designers, if not game fans, for decades. Entries in the field include Blue Max from Game Designers' Workshop, Richthofen's War from Avalon Hill, Wings from Yaquinto, and, most recently, Wings of War from Fantasy Flight. The granddaddy of them all, however, is Dawn Patrol."

== Reviews ==
- Polyhedron #1
- Panzerfaust #59
