= Hank Woon =

American author, game designer and screenwriter

- Born: February 23, 1978 (age 48); Olympia, Washington, United States
- Occupations: Author, game designer, screenwriter
- Writing career
- Years active: 2003–present

Hank Woon (born February 23, 1978, in Olympia, Washington) is an American fiction author, game designer and screenwriter.

== Early life ==
Hank Woon was born in Olympia, Washington and raised in Aberdeen, Washington, and attended Aberdeen-Weatherwax High School.

== Career ==
Hank Woon began freelancing in 2003 with an adventure for the popular tabletop role-playing game Dungeons & Dragons in Dungeon Magazine #97 by Paizo Publishing.

He has written several adventures, articles, and sourcebooks for the Earthdawn, Age of Legend, and Pathfinder Roleplaying Game lines, including writing contributions to the Pathfinder Roleplaying Game Core Rulebook.

In 2008, his first novel, Dark Shadows of Yesterday, was published by RedBrick LLC.

In 2009, Hank worked as an editorial intern with Paizo Publishing. In September 2009, his second Earthdawn novel, Immortal Twilight, was published by RedBrick LLC. The same month, Adamant Entertainment debuted its Pathfinder-compatible monster series, Fell Beasts, of which Hank was one of the authors. They also announced Warpath, a game supplement designed by Hank featuring rules for mass combat for the Pathfinder Roleplaying Game system, released in May 2010.

In April 2013, it was announced that Hank Woon would be penning an original script for The Asylum called Age of Dinosaurs, for director Joseph J. Lawson. This marked Woon's third straight-to-DVD feature.

In October 2014, it was announced that Hank Woon would be co-writing the live-action script for It Came from the Desert with Finnish director Marko Mäkilaakso, based on the cult classic video game by Cinemaware. It was also announced that Woon was hired to rewrite a script titled "Night of the Witch" by Roger!Pictures, to be directed by Finnish director Marko Mäkilaakso. The rewrite was based on an original script written by Loyd Kaufman and Stan Lee.

In May 2017, an animated series on HitRecord titled USAI: The Complete Animated Series was released on HitRecord.org, of which Woon was a contributing writer.

In July 2017, it was announced that Woon would be writing a new anthology series titled "Future Sex" for French digital media studio Blackpills.

On February 23, 2021 both Variety and Deadline reported that Netflix picked up an original screenplay written by Woon titled Gordon Hemingway & The Realm of Cthulhu, which will be produced by Spike Lee and directed by Stefon Bristol, with Jonathan Majors in the title role.

=== Bibliography ===
Year	Title	ISBN	Publisher	Writer	Editor	Notes
2003	DUNGEON MAGAZINE, ISSUE #97 (DEMONBLADE)	ASIN B000VNIBAW	Paizo Publishing	Yes	No	
2006	Earthdawn Classic Player's Compendium	ISBN 978-0-9582661-2-3	RedBrick LLC	No	No	Playtester
2006	Earthdawn Classic Gamemaster's Compendium	ISBN 978-0-9582661-2-3	RedBrick LLC	No	No	Playtester
2007	Tournament Troubles	ISBN 978-1-877451-15-7	RedBrick LLC	No	Yes	
2008	Westhrall's Passage	ISBN 978-1-877451-37-9	RedBrick LLC	No	Yes	
2008	Dark Shadows of Yesterday: An Earthdawn Novel	ISBN 1-877451-38-X	RedBrick LLC	Yes	No	
2008	Immortal Twilight: An Earthdawn Novel	ISBN 978-1-877451-46-1	RedBrick LLC	Yes	No	
2008	Tears for Jaspree		RedBrick LLC	No	Yes	
2008	Betrayal's Sting	ISBN 978-1-877451-36-2	RedBrick LLC	No	Yes	
2008	Fading Suns: Arcane Tech	ISBN 978-1-877451-31-7	RedBrick LLC	No	Yes	
2008	Fading Suns: Dead End		RedBrick LLC	No	Yes	
2008	Fading Suns: Ruinous Folly	ISBN 978-1-877451-35-5	RedBrick LLC	No	Yes	
2008	Western City		RedBrick LLC	No	Yes	
2009	Earthdawn Third Edition: Player's Guide	ISBN 978-1-906508-59-3	RedBrick LLC	No	Yes	Development
2009	Earthdawn Third Edition: Gamemaster's Guide	ISBN 978-1-906508-60-9	RedBrick LLC	No	Yes	Development
2009	Les Ombres Noires Du Passé	ISBN 978-2915847604	Black Book Editions	Yes	No	French translation of Dark Shadows of Yesterday
2009	Pathfinder Roleplaying Game Core Rulebook	ISBN 1601251505	Paizo Publishing	Yes	Yes	
2009	Pathfinder Companion: Dwarves of Golarion	ISBN 1601252048	Paizo Publishing	Yes	No	
2009	Fell Beasts: Volume I		Adamant Entertainment	Yes	No	
2009	Fell Beasts: Volume II		Adamant Entertainment	Yes	No	
2009	Fell Beasts: Volume III		Adamant Entertainment	Yes	No	
2009	Pathfinder Adventure Path: Council of Thieves Players Guide		Paizo Publishing	Yes	Yes	
2009	Earthdawn Third Edition: Kratas City of Thieves	ISBN 978-1-906508-82-1	RedBrick Limited	No	Yes	
2009	Earthdawn Shards Collection Volume I	ISBN 978-1907218101	RedBrick Limited	No	Yes	
2009	Pathfinder Society: The Asmodeus Mirage		Paizo Publishing	No	Yes	
2009	Pathfinder Society: To Scale the Dragon		Paizo Publishing	No	Yes	
2009	Pathfinder Society: Perils of the Pirate Pact		Paizo Publishing	No	Yes	
2009	Pathfinder Society: The Trouble with Secrets		Paizo Publishing	No	Yes	
2009	Pathfinder Society: The Eternal Obelisk		Paizo Publishing	No	Yes	
2009	Pathfinder Society: Skeleton Moon		Paizo Publishing	No	Yes	
2009	Pathfinder Society: King Xeros of Old Azlant		Paizo Publishing	No	Yes	
2009	Pathfinder Society: Fingerprints of the Fiend		Paizo Publishing	No	Yes	
2009	Pathfinder Society: Hands of the Muted God		Paizo Publishing	No	Yes	
2009	Pathfinder Society: Tide of Morning		Paizo Publishing	No	Yes	
2009	Pathfinder Society: Decline of Glory		Paizo Publishing	No	Yes	
2009	Legacy of Fire: Jackal's Price	ISBN 978-1601251619	Paizo Publishing	No	Yes	
2009	Legacy of Fire: The End of Eternity	ISBN 978-1601251732	Paizo Publishing	No	Yes	
2009	Legacy of Fire: The Impossible Eye	ISBN 978-1601251794	Paizo Publishing	No	Yes	
2009	Legacy of Fire: The Final Wish	ISBN 978-1601251794	Paizo Publishing	No	Yes	Additional Development
2009	Council of Thieves Player's Guide	ISBN 978-1601251794	Paizo Publishing	Yes	Yes	
2009	Council of Thieves: Bastards of Erebus	ISBN 978-1601251909	Paizo Publishing	Yes	Yes	
2009	Pathfinder Chronicles: Dungeon Denizens Revisited	ISBN 978-1601251725	Paizo Publishing	No	Yes	
2009	Pathfinder Chronicles: The Great Beyond	ISBN 978-1601251671	Paizo Publishing	No	Yes	
2009	Pathfinder Chronicles: Beyond the Vault of Souls	ISBN 978-1601251749	Paizo Publishing	No	Yes	
2009	Pathfinder Module: Crypt of the Everflame	ISBN 978-1601251862	Paizo Publishing	No	Yes	
2009	Pathfinder Companion: Taldor Echoes of Glory	ISBN 978-1601251695	Paizo Publishing	No	Yes	
2009	Pathfinder Companion: Qadira Gateway to the East	ISBN 978-1601251800	Paizo Publishing	No	Yes	
2009	Pathfinder Companion: Cheliax Empire of Devils	ISBN 978-1601251916	Paizo Publishing	No	Yes	
2009	Pathfinder Roleplaying Game Core Rulebook	ISBN 978-1601251503	Paizo Publishing	Yes	Yes	
2009	Pathfinder Bestiary	ISBN 978-1601251831	Paizo Publishing	Yes	Yes	
2009	Pathfinder Bonus Bestiary	ASIN: B002GVS8TQ	Paizo Publishing	No	Yes	
2009	Pathfinder Chronicles: Princes of Darkness	ISBN 978-1601251893	Paizo Publishing	No	Yes	
2009	Earthdawn Third Edition: Player's Companion	ISBN 978-1-906508-73-9	RedBrick LLC	No	Yes	
2009	Earthdawn Third Edition: Gamemaster's Companion	ISBN 978-1-906508-74-6	RedBrick LLC	No	Yes	
2009	Council of Thieves: The Sixfold Trial	ISBN 978-1601251961	Paizo Publishing	No	Yes	Additional Development
2009	Pathfinder Chronicles: Seekers of Secrets	ISBN 978-1601251787	Paizo Publishing	No	Yes	
2009	Misguided Ambitions		RedBrick LLC	No	Yes	
2009	Ardanyan's Revenge	ISBN 978-1-906508-60-9	RedBrick LLC	No	Yes	
2010	Council of Thieves: What Lies in Dust	ISBN 978-1601251978	Paizo Publishing	Yes	No	
2010	Crépuscule Sans Fin	ISBN 978-2-915847-61-1	Black Book Editions	Yes	No	French translation of Immortal Twilight
2010	Warpath	ISBN 978-1907204357	Adamant Entertainment	Yes	No	
2010	Pathfinder NPC Guide	ISBN 978-1601252197	Paizo Publishing	Yes	No	
2010	Pathfinder Companion: Andoran Spirit of Liberty	ISBN 1601252056	Paizo Publishing	Yes	No	
2010	Pathfinder Society: Sniper in the Deep		Paizo Publishing	Yes	No	
2010	Kobold Quartlyer Issue #11		Kobold Press	Yes	No	
2010	Kobold Quartlyer Issue #13		Kobold Press	Yes	No	
2010	Earthdawn Shards Collection Volume 2	ISBN 1907218106	RedBrick LLC	Yes	Yes	
2010	Pathfinder Society: Echoes of Everward III -- Terror at Whistledown		Paizo Publishing	Yes	No	
2010	Cathay the Five Kingdoms Player's Guide	ISBN 978-1907702068	RedBrick LLC	Yes	No	Lead Writer and Developer
2010	Cathay the Five Kingdoms Gamemaster's Guide	ISBN 978-1907702075	RedBrick LLC	Yes	No	Lead Writer and Developer
2010	Pathfinder Companion: Dwarves of Golarion	ISBN 978-1601252043	Paizo Publishing	Yes	No	
2010	Council of Thieves: The Infernal Syndrome	ISBN 978-1601251985	Paizo Publishing	Yes	No	
2010	Council of Thieves: The Twice-Damned Prince	ISBN 978-1601252265	Paizo Publishing	Yes	No	
2010	Namegivers of Barsaive	ISBN 978-1-906508-60-9	RedBrick LLC	No	Yes	
2010	Nations of Barsaive Volume One: Throal	ISBN 978-1907218378	RedBrick LLC	No	Yes	
2010	Pathfinder Chronicles: NPC Guide	ISBN 978-1601252197	Paizo Publishing	Yes	No	
2010	Nations of Barsaive Volume Two: The Serpent River	ISBN 978-1907218460	RedBrick LLC	No	Yes	
2010	Earthdawn Shards Collection Volume Two	ISBN 978-1907218460	RedBrick LLC	Yes	No	
2010	Earthdawn Shards Collection Volume Two	ISBN 978-1907218460	RedBrick LLC	Yes	No	
2010	Kratas Adventures	ISBN 978-1907218927	RedBrick LLC	Yes	Yes	
2010	Fading Suns Shards Collection Volume One		RedBrick LLC	No	Yes	
2011	Signs & Portents Issue 88		Mongoose Publishing	Yes	No	Contributor "The Daughters of Heaven"
2011	Nations of Barsaive Volume 3: Cara Fahd	ISBN 978-1907702389	RedBrick LLC	Yes	Yes	
2011	Crystal Raiders of Barsaive	ISBN 1907702644	RedBrick LLC	Yes	Yes	
2011	Burning Desires	ISBN 978-1-907702-49-5	RedBrick LLC	No	Yes	
2011	Pokémon Black Version and White Version Strategy Guide	ISBN 978-0307890603	The Pokémon Company International	No	Yes	
2011	Midgard Northlands	ISBN 978-1936781003	Kobold Press	No	Yes	
2012	Earthdawn Player's Guide: Savage Worlds Edition	ISBN 978-1938869006	RedBrick LLC	Yes	Yes	
2012	Earthdawn Player's Guide: Pathfinder Edition	ISBN 978-1938869013	RedBrick LLC	Yes	Yes	
2012	Earthdawn Gamemaster's Guide: Savage Worlds Edition	ISBN 978-1938869020	RedBrick LLC	Yes	Yes	
2012	Earthdawn Gamemaster's Guide: Pathfinder Edition	ISBN 978-1938869037	RedBrick LLC	Yes	Yes	
2012	Creatures of Barsaive: Savage Worlds Edition	ISBN 978-1938869006	RedBrick LLC	Yes	Yes	
2012	Creatures of Barsaive: Pathfinder Edition	ISBN 978-1938869150	RedBrick LLC	Yes	Yes	
2012	Denizens of Barsaive Volume 1: Savage Worlds Edition	ISBN 978-1938869044	RedBrick LLC	Yes	Yes	
2012	Denizens of Barsaive Volume 1: Pathfinder Edition	ISBN 1555602266	RedBrick LLC	Yes	Yes	
2012	Denizens of Barsaive Volume 2: Savage Worlds Edition	ISBN 978-1938869068	RedBrick LLC	Yes	Yes	
2012	Denizens of Barsaive Volume 2: Pathfinder Edition	ISBN 1555602371	RedBrick LLC	Yes	Yes	
2012	Kobold Quarterly Issue #23		Kobold Press	Yes	No	
2012	Pokémon Mega Sticker Collection	ISBN 978-1604381764	Pikachu Press	No	No	Merchandise Development
2013	Equinox Setting Guide		Vagrant Workshop	Yes	No	

== Filmography ==
Year	Title	Contribution	Notes
2013	Age of Dinosaurs	Writer	
2013	Atlantic Rim, aka From the Sea	Writer	Co-written by Thunder Levin and Richard Lima
2013	500 MPH Storm	Writer	Co-written by Kuang Lee
2013	Metal Bum	Special Thanks	Short
2016	Izzie's Way Home	Writer	Story
2017	It Came from the Desert	Writer	Co-written by Trent Haaga and Marko Mäkilaakso
2017	USAI: The Complete Animated Series	Contributing Writer	As Lord_Nothus
2018	Future Sex	Writer	Anthology series
TBA	The Legend of Sinbad	Writer	Co-Written by Andrew Cosby
TBA	Gordon Hemingway & The Realm of Cthulhu	Writer	
