= Spitfire (wargame) =

WWII board wargame published in 1973

Cover of "flatpack" box, 1973

Spitfire, subtitled "Tactical Aerial Combat in Europe 1939-42", is a board wargame published by Simulations Publications Inc. (SPI) in 1973 that simulates aerial combat during World War II.

== Description ==
Spitfire is a two-player game in which Allied and German aircraft engage in combat. The game contains 200 die-cut counters, a large featureless paper hex grid map, and aircraft sheets to track speed, altitude, diving and climbing ability, ammunition supply, and damage suffered. Two scenarios are provided: fighters versus fighters, or fighters versus bombers. The players have their choice of fifteen different fighters and bombers of the time.

== Publication history ==
In 1972, Jim Dunnigan designed Flying Circus, a wargame about aerial combat in World War I. The following year, he used the same game mechanics as the basis for a new game about aerial combat in World War II. With graphic design by Redmond A. Simonsen, the result was Spitfire, which was published in 1973 in both a plain white box with red title ribbon, and a "flatpack" plastic box with an integral counter tray.

== Reception ==
In a 1976 poll conducted by SPI to determine the most popular board wargames in North America, Spitfire was rated a poor 136th out of 202 games.

In his 1977 book The Comprehensive Guide to Board Wargaming, Nick Palmer commented that "Spitfire's simple rules facilitate the fast play which air combat enthusiasts tend to prefer, at the loss of some realism." For more complex games, he recommended Air Force (Battleline Publications, 1976) or Basic Fighter Combat Manual (Gamescience, 1976). For a more strategic treatment, Palmer recommended Their Finest Hour (Game Designers' Workshop, 1976).

In The Playboy Winner's Guide to Board Games, game designer Jon Freeman thought that Spitfire was not as good as the World War I tactical air combat game Richthofen's War.

In The Guide to Simulations/Games for Education and Training, Martin Campion found that "The rules of Spitfire are excessively rigid and abstract and they cause the aircraft to behave in an unpleasant, wooden fashion." Campion concluded, "This game might profit from new rules supplied by the user."

== Other reviews and commentary ==
- Fire & Movement #72
- Moves #9
- The Wargamer Vol.1, #1 & #2
- Jagdpanther #5
- *Panzerschreck #6
- Pursue & Destroy Vol.1, #3
