= Eclipse phase =

Eclipse phase may refer to:

- Part of the viral life cycle
- Eclipse Phase, a science–fiction role–playing game
