= BattleTech: 25 Years of Art & Fiction =

Nonfiction book

BattleTech: 25 Years of Art & Fiction is a non-fiction book published by Catalyst Game Labs in 2009 about the science fiction wargame BattleTech. It includes artwork, a description of the development of the game, an historical timeline of in-game history, and twenty pieces of fiction by authors such as Michael A. Stackpole, Robert Charrette and Victor Milán.

== Contents ==
In addition to many pieces of art related to BattleTech, the book contains:

- Foreword by Jordan Weisman, founder of the game company FASA
- Introduction
- Timeline: The evolution of the game from FASA's original boardgame into a franchise that includes numerous expansions to the original game, several board games, role playing games, video games, a collectible card game, a series of more than 100 novels, and an animated television series.
- Fiction
  - "Ozymandias" by Victor Milán.
  - "Starfire" by William H. Keith Jr.
  - "Thus it Shall Stand" by Jason Schmetzer
  - "A Little Piece of War" by Thomas S. Gressman
  - "Remaining Unperceived" by Robert Charrette
  - "Marsh Owl" by Kevin Killiany
  - "Tactics of Betrayal" by David L. McCulloch
  - "The Walking Dead" by Blaine Lee Pardoe
  - "Hornet's Nest" by Craig K. Erne
  - "Vector" by Ilsa Bick
  - "Face In The Viewport" by Robert Thurston
  - "Means To An End" by Loren L. Coleman
  - "Cherry Blossoms" by Adam Sherwood
  - "First Chair" by Jim Long
  - "The Color Of Rage" by Randall N. Bills
  - "Three Sides To Every Story" by Keith R. A. DeCandido
  - "Teach The Wicked" by Phaedra Weldon
  - "Well Met In The Future" by Michael A. Stackpole
  - "The Dark Age"
  - "End Transmission" by Steven Mohan Jr.
- Computer Bibliography
- Bibliography

== Publication history ==
FASA originally published BattleTech as a board wargame in 1984. Twenty-three years later, in 2007, Catalyst Game Design acquired the licenses to both BattleTech and Shadowrun. For the 25th anniversary of the BattleTech franchise in 2009, Catalyst released Battletech: 25 Years of Art & Fiction, a large 304-page coffee table book with lavish illustrations including "The Unseen", a number of pieces of art that had been used in early iterations of the game but had never been republished. Although originally offered for sale in July 2009, the book was almost immediately removed from Catalyst's inventory. A month later, Catalyst's managing editor Randall Bills revealed that after the book's release, Catalyst had discovered that the North American license for twelve of the "Unseen" images rested with another American company, the result of a confidential agreement following a court case in the 1990s. Catalyst subsequently reprinted and released a new version of the book without the twelve images.

== Reception ==
Writing for BattleGrip, Philip Reed called this book "the source of hours of entertainment. Though the fiction in the book may be new — and fun — it’s the art from the eighties, nineties, and up through 2009 that makes this book a great buy for anyone who has ever enjoyed the BattleTech games or fiction." Reed highly recommended the book, saying, "This book is one that I’ve taken off of the shelf countless times over the last few years. Excellent work and lots of fun."

== Awards ==
- At the 2010 Origins Awards, BattleTech: 25 Years of Art & Fiction won "Best Game-Related Book of 2009".
- At the 2010 ENnie Awards, this book won a Silver for "Best RPG Related Product of 2009."
