= Inferno (board game) =

Board game

Inferno is a combat board game that was published by Global Games Company in 1996.

== Description ==
Inferno is a miniatures-based game for 2-5 players that is set in Dante Alighieri's Inferno. Each player chooses an Archfiend and arms it with spells and weapons, and also chooses and arms several lieutenants. After each player has created their group of demons, they battle each other for control of the Abyss. Once a group has been defeated, that player is eliminated from the game. The last player to survive is the winner.

=== Components ===
The game comes with

- two hex grid maps
- four cardstock sheets of cutouts that include counters, chits, and circles
- a 64-page book of Fiendish history titled "The Tome of the Abyss"
- a rulebook
- two six-sided dice
- The first issue ("Issue 0") of H.A.V.O.C. Magazine

== Publication history ==
Canadian games company Global Games had previously published the board game Legions of Steel (1992), for which they also marketed associated lines of 25 mm miniatures. In similar fashion, Global published Inferno in 1996, a board game designed by Marco Pecota that also came with cardboard counters, but for which Global produced extensive lines of metal miniatures. A German-language version of the game was marketed in Germany by FanPro. Although the first issue of H.A.V.O.C. Magazine was included with the game, no further issues were ever published.

The following year, Global Games released an associated role-playing game, Abyss, that could also use the same lines of metal miniatures.

After Global Games went out of business, the European rights to Global's lines of miniatures were acquired by British miniatures manufacturer Amazon Miniatures.

== Reception ==
Jim Swallow reviewed Inferno: Battles of the Abyss for Arcane magazine, rating it a 6 out of 10 overall, and stated that "A transplanting of the BattleTech school of wargames into Hell, this is going to appeal to fantasy tabletop gamers looking for something different. While the rules are a bit flat and lacklustre, the stunning graphics come a long way towards forgiving its sins. Try before you buy if at all possible."

In the October 1997 edition of Dragon (#240), Rick Swan thought the game was "elaborate", the components were "attractive", and concluded "The game itself is as involving — and demanding — as a military simulation."

== Other reviews ==
- Backstab (Issue 1 - Jan/Feb 1997)
- Casus Belli #102
- Rue Morgue #1
- Pyramid #24
