= Rob Boyle =

American game designer

- Occupation: Game designer

Robert Boyle is a game designer who has worked primarily on role-playing games.

== Career ==
Rob Boyle was working as an editor for FASA as the company was closing, and chose not to move to WizKids when that company was created, since that they were not going to be working on the role-playing lines of FASA. Boyle wanted to get the license for Shadowrun, but Fantasy Productions expressed an interest in Shadowrun first and their founder Werner Fuchs invited Boyle to visit him in Germany, and Boyle soon set up and ran the new corporation FanPro LLC, created by two Fantasy Productions principals and Boyle. Fantasy Productions created FanPro LLC as a subsidiary in the USA to hold the FASA game line rights. FanPro licensed Shadowrun in early 2001 with Boyle as line editor. FanPro got Shadowrun back in development right away, and Boyle focused on continuing the metaplot of the game. Boyle tried out a new approach with the downloadable Shadowrun Missions adventures, which Rich Osterhout oversaw for their first season. Boyle began work on a new Shadowrun edition around 2003, with the intention to provide much needed simplification, and this was published as Shadowrun, Fourth Edition (2005).

Boyle and Randall N. Bills attempted to purchase FanPro LLC from Fantasy Productions in 2007 but when that failed they threatened to leave and bid for the WizKids licenses when they came up for renewal; WizKids came to mediate and while they would not allow Boyle and Bills to start a new company, they did grant the licenses to InMediaRes. InMediaRes added Boyle and Bills on as regular staff per the agreement with WizKids, once they gained the rights to Shadowrun and Battletech; Boyle continued as the Shadowrun line editor for a few more years, while Bills was made a managing director of InMediaRes.

Boyle created the game design studio Posthuman Studios with Shadowrun writer Brian Cross, and graphic designer Adam Jury, and the new studio produced Eclipse Phase (2009), the fourth role-playing game from Catalyst Game Labs. Boyle was thinking about the idea for Eclipse Phase since coming from FanPro, and once the game was published Boyle ended his role as Shadowrun developer. Boyle was unable to release any Eclipse Phase supplements before he ended his relationship with Catalyst due to problems at that company.
