= Dulcop =

Italian toy company

Dulcop International S.p.A.
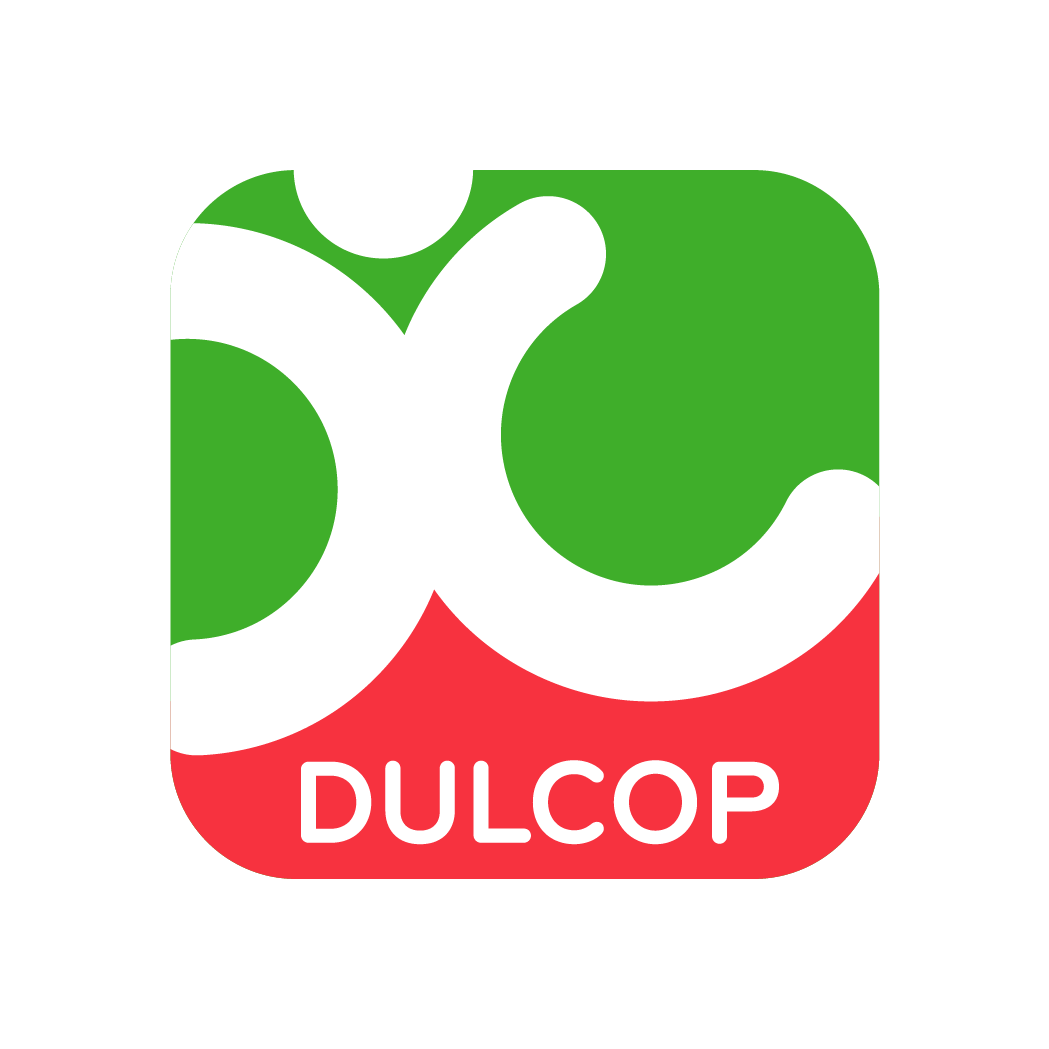
- Company type: Private
- Industry: Toys
- Founded: 1938 in San Lazzaro di Savena, Bologna, Italy
- Founder: Melotti family
- Headquarters: San Lazzaro di Savena, Bologna
- Key people: CEO: Andrea Melotti, Alessandro Melotti
- Products: Soap bubbles; Bubbles toys
- Operating income: €10m–15m
- Number of employees: 35–50
- Website: www.dulcop.com

Dulcop International S.p.A. (Dulcop) is an Italian company, founded in 1938, which produces soap bubbles and bubble toys. The company's headquarters is located in San Lazzaro di Savena, Bologna, Italy.

== History ==
The company began in 1938 as La Nuova Dolciaria, a business focused on confectionery for children. La Nuova Dolciaria was purchased by Athos Melotti in 1957, thus beginning the legacy of the Melotti family. Two years later, the company changed its name to DULCOP DI MELOTTI RAG. ATHOS.

By 1960, the company branched out and began to produce plastic packaging for confectionery. It was not until 1969 that the first soap bubbles were produced. During this time, plastic toy production was still active as well, but the “dolce sorso” (a sweet beverage inside a baby bottle) remained the company's best seller.

Toy soldiers became the core business in 1970, together with the production of brands such as Airfix and Atlantic. Their classic toy soldier evolved into Charlie Kit, which could be found in Ferrero’s Kinder Surprise, and the Super Charlie hinged soldiers, which were sold separately as action figures. At the end of the decade, in 1979, the company once again changed its name, becoming Dulcop International S.p.A.

During the 1980s, production delved into plastic products for the home, which were sold as collectibles. It was not until 1985, due to a change in the market, that Dulcop started to focus on soap bubble production. With their history in plastic molding, production could be completely in-house for the standard 60 ml bottles. Experimentation on bottle size also began at this time. However, from 1985 through 2004, the company also launched a major collaboration with Ferrero. Plastics for Ferrero’s Kinder Surprise represented 50% of the company’s turnover during this period.

The company created Babbol, a character based on the iconic shape of the 60ml bottles, in 1998. Babbol starred in a series of kids’ comics as well as being used on their own line of graphics. By 2001, with the focus more heavily on bubbles, Dulcop increased their bubble offerings with more soap bubble selections and an expanded bubble toy line. In 2013, it hit a milestone by producing its 1 billionth soap bubble bottle. 2015 saw the installation of a new, more efficient automatized line for production and the establishment of a US subsidiary, Dulcop America, located in Charlotte, North Carolina. 2018 marked the company's 80th year of operations.

Dulcop operates with an EC Type Certificate (Type Approval), which it obtained in 2012, as well as a TÜV Rheinland certification, which it obtained in 2014

== Dulcop brands ==
Dulcop currently has two brands: Bubble World and Babbol. The Bubble World line was realized in January 2019. It presents 9 graphics: Color, ABC, Teddy Bear, Sport, Sea, Unicorn, Flamingo, Little Dragons, and Party. The bottles are available in several different sizes and quantities.

Babbol was launched in 2017 for the 60 ml sized bottles in Italy. The bottles come with an app, Real Babbol, which can be scanned from the label. The company called these virtual soap bubbles "Neverending bubbles".

== Dulcop products ==
=== Soap bubbles ===
The classic soap bubble bottle is the 60 ml Standard. It comes with the ball and maze game on the cap, which became a symbol of the company. The 60 ml is also easily recognizable from the red built-in wand. From 1969, Dulcop realized three additional bottle shapes: Slim (120 ml), Maxi (175 ml) and Glass (300 ml). The bottle shapes are all registered as 3D trademarks. Over the years, the company focused on the enhancement of the product, making the solution hypoallergenic, Kathon- and Gluten- free, and more environmentally-friendly by reducing the plastic in their bottles by 15%.

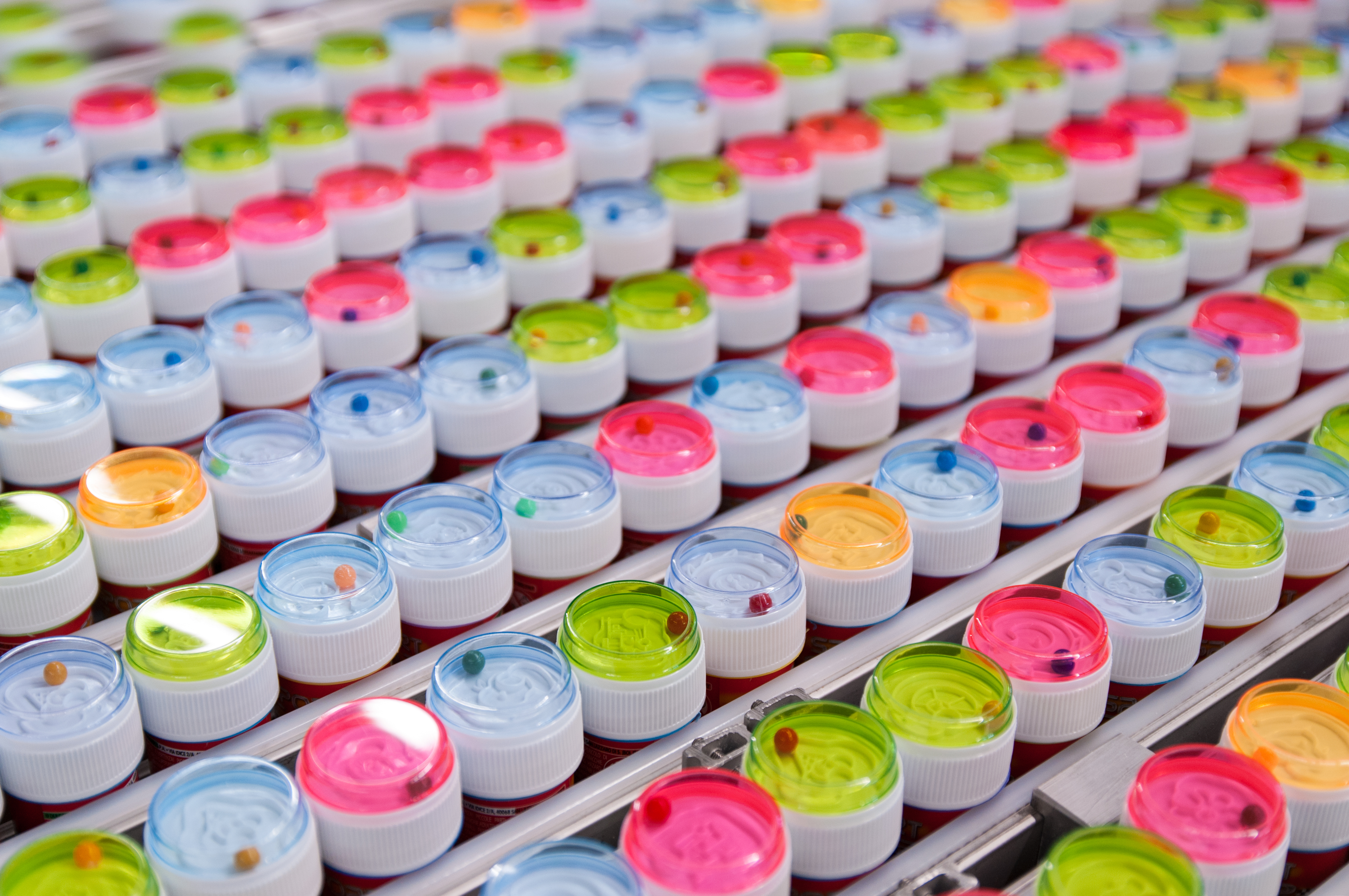
Soap bubble bottles. The ball and maze game on the cap was invented by Dulcop.

== National and International Tradeshow Attendance ==
Spielwarenmesse is the most important tradeshow the company participates in, having joined in 1973 and exhibited every year since. It is the biggest Toy Fair in the world and takes place every year in Nuremberg, (Germany)

In the 1960s and 1980s, the company also exhibited at important Fairs such as the Paris and Milan Toy Fair. Starting in 2018, Dulcop began exhibiting at Toys Milano.

== Collaborations and initiatives ==
In 2013, Dulcop joined Emergency and Jaeger-LeCoultre in the project "It's time to help Sierra Leone". For the occasion, the company was asked to create customized soap bubbles for the Venice Film Festival, to blow on the red carpet.

In 2016, Dulcop started a collaboration with the artistic duo Antonello Ghezzi. The two artists created an on-going performance called Blow against the walls, where the attendees to the exhibition have to blow soap bubbles against a wall. The project is a journey around the world, aiming to destroy physical barriers built by humans. The performance was shown in Paris, Athens, Bologna, Beirut, Bahrein, Brussels, and New York City. Dulcop provided the bubbles for the performances.

In 2016, Dulcop also teamed up with Disturbo, an Italian cultural association that organizes a photo scavenger hunt in Italy. For the occasion, the company gave the association its soap bubbles to blow during the event.
