= Flying Circus (wargame) =

Board wargame published in 1972

- Cover of boxed set, 1972
- Publishers: Simulations Publications Inc.
- Years active: 1972; 54 years ago
- Genres: board wargame

Flying Circus, subtitled "Tactical Aerial Combat, 1915–1918", is a board wargame published by Simulations Publications Inc. (SPI) in 1972 that simulates aerial combat during World War I.

== Background ==
Early in World War I, generals of all armies realized the strategic importance of reconnaissance aircraft that could provide intelligence on enemy movements. They also realized that for the same reason, it was important to destroy enemy reconnaissance aircraft. Scouts (also known as "fighters") quickly became armed with machine guns, both to shoot down enemy reconnaissance aircraft and to defend their own from enemy scouts. Over the Western Front, small groups of scouts gradually increased in size. One German squadron, the Jagdgeschwader I, commanded by Manfred von Richthofen , was nicknamed the "Flying Circus" because of the bright colors of its aircraft. These large squadrons often engaged in dogfights for aerial supremacy.

== Description ==
Flying Circus is a 2–6 player game in which half the players control Allied aircraft and the other half German aircraft. The game contains 200 counters, a large paper hex grid map, and aircraft sheets to track speed, altitude, diving and climbing ability, ammunition supply, and damage suffered. The game includes a large number of possible scenarios, each one listing possible aircraft that can be used. The German list contains five scouts and one reconnaissance aircraft, the British have five scouts and two reconnaissance machines, and the French have six scouts and one reconnaissance aircraft. The performance capabilities of the aircraft vary, especially those from different years of the war.

== Publication history ==
Flying Circus was designed by Jim Dunnigan, and Redmond A. Simonsen provided the graphic design. It was released as a pull-out game in the March 1972 issue of Strategy & Tactics. It was also released as a boxed set the same year. However, this niche of World War I aerial combat was crowded with rivals: Guidon Games had just released Fight in the Skies and Avalon Hill published Richthofen's War a few months later. In a poll conducted by SPI to determine North America's most popular wargames, both these rival games proved to be much more popular than Flying Circus. Critic David Bolton predicted that "a lot of copies of Flying Circus will be gathering dust all over the country." As Joe Scoleri noted, the game quickly disappeared from store shelves.

The following year, Jim Dunnigan used the game mechanics from Flying Circus as the basis of the World War II aerial combat game Spitfire and a few of the game mechanics appeared in the modern jet combat game Foxbat & Phantom.

== Reception ==
In Issue 11 of the UK magazine Games & Puzzles, Don Turnbull called this "A delightful tactical air war game." He liked the large number of scenarios, "some taking as little as half an hour." He concluded, "Some of the 'superiority' scenarios can get a bit dull, as players maneouvre for position, but other scenarios are more exciting and give plenty of action in a short space of time."

In Issue 4 of Moves, Martion Campion thought that Flying Circus "deals with the battles of World War I aircraft in a very appealing way." However, he pointed out that although the title Flying Circus seemed to imply large numbers of airplanes, "it is only possible to have three planes on each side." Campion found some of the scenarios were "faulty", including one Allied reconnaissance mission that turned out to be an automatic victory. But he admitted that most of the scenarios were "true tests." Campion concluded by recommending the game for both novices and gamers, saying, "Admittedly, it contains compromises, but it is still realistic, simple to operate, and challenging at the same time - a rare combination."

In Issue 5 of the UK wargaming magazine Phoenix, David Bolton noted that the game was not popular, "which is a shame because the game can be improved." He then went on to suggest several rules modifications to provide a more entertaining game, including a new sequence of play, modifications to the fields of fire, and a plotted movement mechanism.

In a retrospective review in Issue 9 of Simulacrum, Joe Scoleri compared Flying Circus to rival games Fight in the Skies and Richthofen's War, saying, "Unfortunately, Flying Circus lacked the personality and depth to stand up to its contemporaries. Both Fight in the Skies and Richthofen's War featured a larger selection of aircraft, more historical background information, and counters with individual aircraft silhouettes. The generic Flying Circus counters (numbered for altitude) were functional but bland." Scoleri concluded, "It's no surprise that Flying Circus dropped off the radar not long after its release while the competing titles managed to live on for years and years."

== Other reviews and commentary ==
- Panzerfaust #59
- The Wargamer V2 #25
- Jagdpanther #8
- Wargamer News #41
- Battleflag V.1 #25
