= Loren L. Coleman =

American novelist

- Born: Longview, Washington, U.S.
- Writing career
- Years active: 1990s–present
- Subject: Science Fiction
- Notable works: Double-Blind; Endgame
- Website: www.lorenlcoleman.com

Loren L. Coleman is an American science-fiction writer, born and grew up in Longview, Washington. He is known for having written many books for series such as Star Trek, Battletech/Mechwarrior, Age of Conan, Crimson Skies, Magic: The Gathering and others. He has also written game fiction and source material for such companies as FASA Corporation, TSR, Inc. and Wizards of the Coast. He resides in Washington with his wife Heather and three children.

== Career ==
Loren L. Coleman is a former member of the United States Navy. He has written several novels for Battletech, including the last of FASA's novels for the "Classic" BattleTech era, Endgame (2002). Coleman also secured a license to publish original Battletech fiction set in that same era, which he was able sell using a subscription-based website; Randall N. Bills, the BattleTech line developer, was interested regarding Coleman's idea and how it could be used to start a new business.

He is also one of the founders of InMediaRes, a company that he started with Heather Coleman, Randall Bills, Tara Bills and Philip DeLuca in 2003 with the intention of licensing Classic BattleTech fiction. This was accomplished in the fall of 2003 when WizKids agreed to grant IMR an exclusive license for publishing new, canon BattleTech fiction online. This was done through BattleCorps.com, which was launched in August 2004.

In 2005, InMediaRes announced its intention to create a similar website for Shadowrun, Holostreets. Coleman announced on April 20, 2007, that InMediaRes was in negotiations to acquire the licenses for Classic BattleTech and Shadowrun from WizKids as Fantasy Productions' license was set to expire. In June 2007, InMediaRes created the Catalyst Game Labs imprint from which to publish their Shadowrun, and Classic BattleTech licensed properties, as well as other material which could be produced or licensed at a later date. In early 2010s, he began writing The ICAS Files series, a science fiction short-stories.

== Bibliography ==
- 1997. Double-Blind
- 1997. Binding Force
- 1999. Bloodlines
- 1999. Into the Maelstrom
- 1999. Threads of Ambition
- 1999. Killing Fields, The
- 2000. Illusions of Victory
- 2000. Rogue Flyer
- 2001. Falcon's Prey
- 2001. Flashpoint
- 2001. Patriots and Tyrants
- 2002. Storms of Fate
- 2002. Endgame
- 2003. By Temptations and By War
- 2003. Call to Arms, A
- 2004. Blood of the Isle
- 2005. Blood of Wolves
- 2005. Cimmerian Rage
- 2005. Fortress Republic
- 2005. Songs of Victory
- 2005. Sword of Sedition
