= Hans Joachim Alpers =

German writer

- Born: 14 July 1943; Bremerhaven, Germany
- Died: February 16, 2011 (aged 67)
- Occupations: Writer, Editor
- Writing career
- Genres: Science fiction, Fantasy

Hans Joachim Alpers (14 July 1943 – 16 February 2011) was a German writer and editor of science fiction and fantasy. Together with Werner Fuchs and Ulrich Kiesow he founded Fantasy Productions, which became one of the premier German RPG- and board game producers and retailers. He was born in Bremerhaven.

As an editor he co-founded the highly successful German-language role-playing game The Dark Eye and the Science Fiction Times and as a critic he was a contributor to Science Fiction Studies. As a writer he used several pseudonyms including Jürgen Andreas, Thorn Forrester, Daniel Herbst, Gregory Kern, Mischa Morrison, P.T. Vieton, and Jörn de Vries. He won the Kurd-Laßwitz-Preis for the novels Das zerrissene Land and Die graue Eminenz. He also co-wrote a six-volume series of young-adult SF with Ronald M. Hahn Das Raumschiff der Kinder (translates as "The Children's Spaceship").

He edited anthologies, annual publications, and reference works. Anthologies included Science Fiction aus Deutschland: 24 Stories von 20 Autoren (1974). Annual publications included the Science-fiction-Almanach (1981–1987) and Science-fiction-Jahrbuch (1983–1987). Reference works included Reclams Science-fiction-Führer (1982), Lexikon der Science-fiction-Literatur (1980, 1988), Lexikon der Horrorliteratur (1999), and Lexikon der Fantasy-Literatur (2005).

He lived in Hamburg.

In 2012 he was awarded a posthumous special Kurd-Laßwitz-Preis for his many years of contributing to German-language SF.
