= Age of Dinosaurs =

- Directed by: Joseph J. Lawson
- Written by: Hank Woon
- Produced by: David Michael Latt
- Starring: Ronny Cox; Treat Williams; Jose Rosete
- Edited by: Rob Pallatina
- Music by: Chris Ridenhour
- Production company: The Asylum
- Release date: September 11, 2013
- Running time: 91 minutes
- Country: United States
- Language: English

Age of Dinosaurs is a 2013 American science fiction action film directed by Joseph J. Lawson and starring Ronny Cox and Treat Williams.

== Plot ==
Using flesh-regeneration machines, Genetisharp (a biotech company) creates a set of living dinosaurs and pterosaurs from a strand of DNA. The creatures escape and terrorize Los Angeles. These prehistoric animals include a giant Ceratosaurus, raptorlike Carnotaurus, building-climbing Spinosaurus, and brutal Pteranodon. The final battle is on the Hollywood Sign, and the dinosaurs are all destroyed when they are run into a collapsing building due to them being drawn there by scent.

== Cast ==
- Treat Williams as Gabe Jacobs
- Ronny Cox as Justin
- Jillian Rose Reed as Jade Jacobs
- Joshua Michael Allen as Craig Carson
- Max Aria as Leo Karst
- Johannes Goetz as Hans
- Julia Paul as Leanna
- Arthur Richardson as Sergeant Mike
- Jose Rosete as Doug
- Laura Tuny as Kim Evans
- Roani Whent as Nile
- Jodi Lyn Brockton as Vanessa
- Kelly V. Dolan as Technician Rosario
- Jennifer Robyn Jacobs as Technician Graham
- Andray Johnson as Police Chief Dawson
- Roger Lim as Lieutenant Crawford
- Ben Anklam as SWAT Leader (credited as Benjamin Jameson)

== See also ==
- List of films featuring dinosaurs
