= InMediaRes Productions =

InMediaRes Productions, LLC
- Company type: Private
- Industry: Electronic publishing Role-playing games
- Founded: 2003
- Founder: Loren L. Coleman; Heather Coleman; Randall N. Bills; Tara Bills; Philip DeLuca
- Headquarters: Lake Stevens, Washington, U.S.
- Subsidiaries: Catalyst Game Labs; Battlecorps
- Website: defunct, formerly imrpro.com at the Wayback Machine (archived 5 February 2012)

InMediaRes Productions, LLC is an American game company that produces role-playing games and game supplements.

== History ==
Loren L. Coleman founded the company InMediaRes Productions in 2003 with Heather Coleman, Randall Bills, Tara Bills, and Philip DeLuca. InMediaRes obtained a license from WizKids in fall 2003 for the electronic publication of fiction from Classic Battletech. InMediaRes announced this at GenCon 36 that year and their full website, BattleCorps.com, was ready one year later in August 2004. InMediaRes started by publishing the fiction written by founders Bills and Coleman, and continued month-by-month with an electronic delivery model. InMediaRes announced their intentions in 2005 to begin a similar "Holostreets" website for Shadowrun fiction but this was never completed. After changes to the license for InMediaRes in 2007 and 2008, some of the fiction from the BattleCorps website was published in print as Battletech Corps Vol. 1: The Corps (2008) and Battletech Corps Vol. 2: First Strike (2010).

Rob Boyle and Bills tried to purchase FanPro LLC from Fantasy Productions in 2007, and when that deal fell through WizKids came to mediate; although they would not allow Boyle and Bills to start a new company, they did give the Battletech and Shadowrun licenses to InMediaRes. With the rights to both FASA games, Boyle and Bills joined InMediaRes as regular staff as part of their agreement with WizKids. Boyle stayed as the line editor on Shadowrun for a few years, and Bills left the line director of Battletech to take on the role of a Managing Director of InMediaRes. InMediaRes created a subsidiary to hold the game rights they had acquired: Catalyst Game Labs. InMediaRes highly valued electronic material, and in 2007 started charging for Shadowrun releases from Catalyst.

== Company information ==
InMediaRes Productions was founded in 2003 by Loren and Heather Coleman, Tara and Randall N. Bills and Philip DeLuca with the express purpose of licensing the rights to publish new, canon Classic BattleTech fiction to the Internet from WizKids. Wizkids granted this license to IMR in the fall of 2003, which directly led to the creation of BattleCorps in August 2004. In 2005, IMR announced its intentions to branch out into Shadowrun fiction and established Holostreets with the intention of doing for Shadowrun what had been done for BattleTech. IMR hopes to have Holostreets up and running by 2008.

On April 20, 2007, IMR announced that it was in negotiations with WizKids and FanPro to acquire the licenses for Classic BattleTech and Shadowrun, as FanPro's licenses were set to expire. On May 17, 2007, IMR announced the creation of Catalyst Game Labs in preparation for the acquisition of the licenses. As of mid-2007, Catalyst began releasing new sourcebooks for both lines.

Heather Coleman serves as IMR's executive manager, while Loren is the submissions editor for BattleCorps.
