= Andrea Angiolino =

Italian board game designer

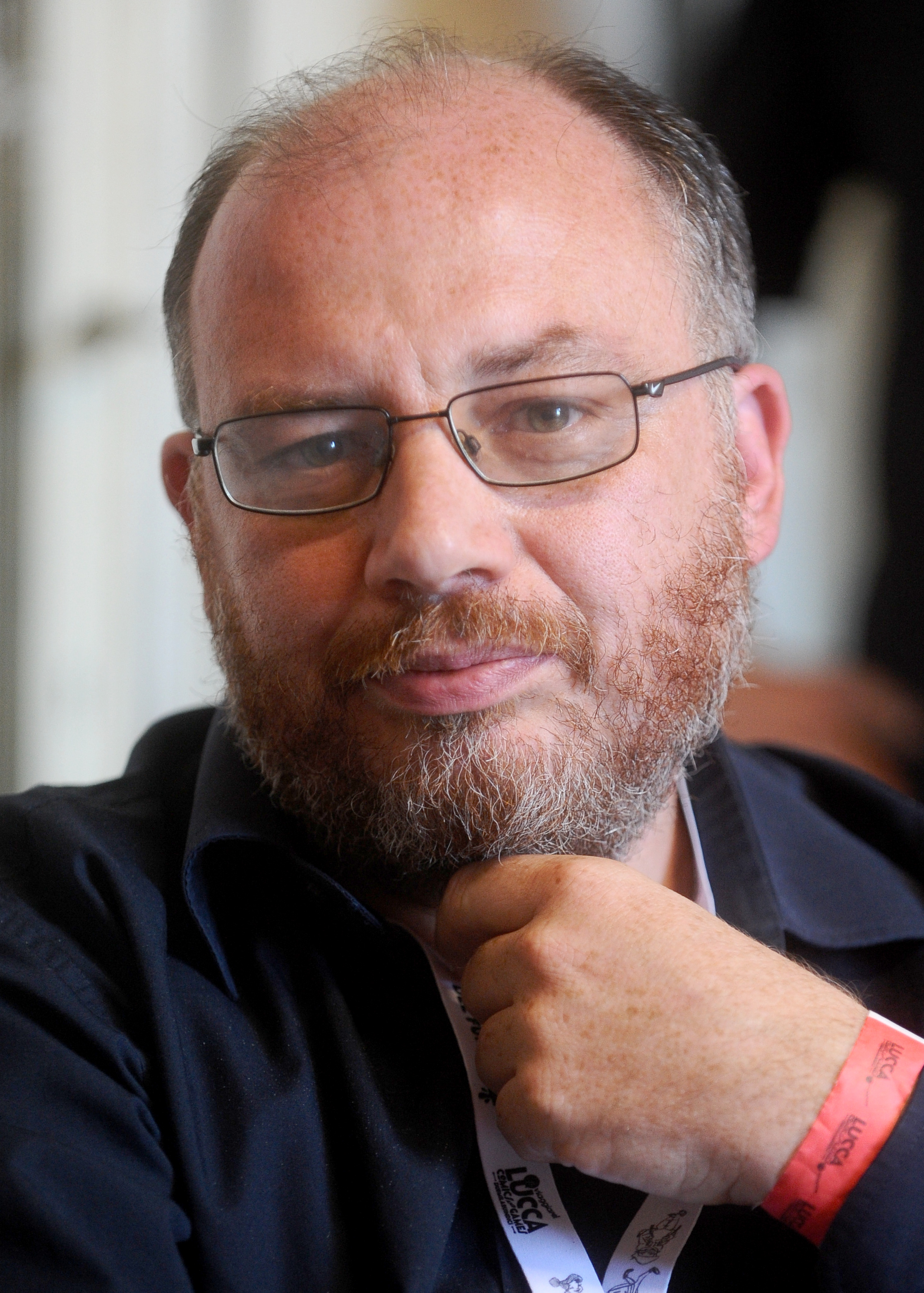
Andrea Angiolino at Lucca Comics and Games 2015

Andrea Angiolino (born April 27, 1966, in Rome, Italy) is an Italian game designer.

== Career ==
=== Journalist ===
He is a professional journalist. He started with a column about role-playing games on the Italian monthly magazine Pergioco in September 1982, together with Gregory Alegi, and then worked for many national newspaper and magazines, radio broadcasts and Internet sites.

=== Game designer ===
Among his last boardgames, Dragon Ball – Alla ricerca delle sette sfere (Nexus Editrice 1998), Ulysses (Winning Moves 2001), Wings of War (later Wings of Glory), Battlestar Galactica: Starship Battles (Ares Games 2018), Isla Dorada (FunForge 2010, English edition by Fantasy Flight Games), and the card game Obscura Tempora (Rose & Poison 2005). His role-playing games include Orlando Furioso, written with Gianluca Meluzzi, published by the City Council of Rome to be distributed in schools and public libraries. He created games for radio and TV, magazines, training, advertising, festivals and shows.

=== Author ===
He wrote more than 20 books, some translated into several languages. His main work is a "Games Dictionary" (Dizionario del Gioco, with Beniamino Sidoti, Zanichelli 2010) with more than 6500 entries and nearly 1200 pages. He was the first Italian author to publish a choose-your-own-story gamebook, In Cerca di fortuna and the first to publish one for kids who can not read: Il Mischiastorie – Osvaldo e i cacciatori.

He published fantasy short stories and an encyclopaedia of the fantastic world of Warhammer.

He published two manuals about the use in schools and libraries of gamebooks and role-playing games, and he also gives lessons to teachers and librarians about the use of games in general.

== Recognition ==
In 1999 the Italian Ministry for Public Teaching named him "Expert Game Inventor". In November 2004, he received the first Special Best of Show for Distinguished Achievements from the Lucca Games show. In summer 2008 he was awarded the Personalità Ludica dell'Anno 2007 (Game Person of the Year 2007) prize.

== Main works in English ==
Andrea Angiolino

- Super Sharp Pencil & Paper Games, Sterling 1995 (reprinted in 2003 as "Mind Sharpening Logic Games")
- Obscura Tempora, Rose & Poison 2005.
- Earthquakes how and why, Giunti 2010

Andrea Angiolino & Pier Giorgio Paglia

- Wings of War – Famous Aces, Nexus Editrice 2004
- "Wings of War – Watch your back!", Nexus Editrice 2005
- Wings of War – Burning Drachens, Nexus Editrice 2006
- Wings of War – Dawn of War, Nexus Editrice 2007
- Wings of War – Fire from the Sky, NG International 2009
- Wings of War WW2 Miniatures – Deluxe set, NG International 2009
- Wings of War – Flight of the Giants, NG International 2009
- Wings of War Miniatures – Revised Deluxe set, NG International 2010
- Wings of Glory – WW2 Starter Set, Ares Games 2012
- Wings of Glory – WW1 Rules & Accessories Pack, Ares Games 2012
- Wings of Glory – WW2 Rules & Accessories Pack, Ares Games 2013
- Wings of Glory – WW1 Duel Pack, Ares Games 2013

Andrea Angiolino & Andrea Mainini

- Sails of Glory – Napoleonic Wars, Ares Games 2013
- Battlestar Galactica: Starship Battles, Ares Games 2018
- Bruno Faidutti, Alan R. Moon, Andrea Angiolino & Pier Giorgio Paglia, Isla Dorada, FunForge 2010
