= Galaxy Serie =

Action figures line

Galaxy Serie was a science fiction themed toy line produced by Italian company Atlantic from 1978 to the early 1980s. It was commercialized in several European countries, including Italy, France, and Greece. The toy line comprised a series of action figures and a set of vehicles, as well as a chess-inspired board game called Cosmo Checkers ("Cosmoscacchi" in the italian edition) that employed the Galaxy action figures as pieces. Most boxes included comics booklets describing the setting and characters of the toy line.

== Action figures ==
The original and main action figures of the Atlantic Galaxy series were "Sky-Man" (a human "space legionary"), his companion robot "Humbot", his opponent the evil alien "Zephton" and Zepthon's robot, "Dynatlon". All these were made in plastic and composed of several pieces; random permutations of 10 base colours were available. Each figure had a few items such as laser gun, rocket-thrower, helmet, and so on.

A second generation of action figures was marketed later and more limitedly. This included "Sky-Girl" (Sky-Man's female partner), "Hypnos" (an alien ant-man, the only figure in the series to be composed of metallic parts as well as plastic), and "Sloggy" (an alien snail-man).

== Vehicles ==
Atlantic also marketed some Galaxy vehicles, also in a limited number; these are now as rare as the second-generation action figures and thus sought after by collectors. Most were battery-operated. Each was designed to accommodate a specific character: for Humbot, this included the "Flying saucer", "Interstar Car", "Falcon" (a fighter starship), "Land Air", and "Tempest"; for Sky-Man, the "Cygnus" (a futuristic motorbike); and for Zepthon and Dynathlon, the "Skorpion" (a chariot pulled by a four-legged monster). An additional vehicle, the "Supercar Interceptor", was also part of the Atlantic Galaxy line but in a smaller scale, with built-in, fixed pilots.
