= Conflict of Heroes: Storms of Steel =

2009 board wargame

1st edition box, cover art by Steve Paschal

Conflict of Heroes: Storms of Steel, the second installment of the Conflict of Heroes board wargame series by Academy Games, was published in 2009. The game simulates the Battle of Kursk on the Eastern Front during World War II.

== Historical background ==
In July 1943, German forces launched Operation Citadel in an attempt to pinch off a Soviet salient near the city of Kursk and blunt an expected Soviet offensive, but the German attack encountered strong and well-prepared defenses. With the unexpected and almost simultaneous Allied invasion of Sicily, Operation Citadel was called off after only a week in order to divert resources to Italy. Soviet forces then launched a counteroffensive, Operation Polkovodets Rumyantsev, that successfully forced the Germans into a retreat.

== Description ==
Conflict of Heroes: Storms of Steel is a 2-player simulation of the various encounters and engagements during the Battle of Kursk.

=== Components ===
The game box contains:

- four 19.5" x 14.75" mounted hex grid maps scaled at 50 m (54.7 yd) per hex
- several geomorphic pieces
- four 6-sided Battle Dice
- two 10-sided Spent Dice
- 200 die-cut counters
- Round and Victory Track
- four Command Action Point Tracks
- 48 Battle Cards
- seven Weapon Cards
- ten Veteran Cards
- 40-page rulebook
- 36-page scenario book containing 14 missions
- two Rules Summary Sheets

=== Gameplay ===
To start a round, Combat Cards are dealt to both players. The players roll for initiative. The player who wins initiative can either choose to activate a unit or let the opponent activate a unit. The selected unit then uses up to seven Action Points to perform an action:

- Move to an adjacent hex
- Attack a target hex
- Rally to remove a hit marker
- Stall
- Play an Action Card (Cards with positive effects can be played on the active player's units, and cards with negative effects can be played on opposing units.)

After the unit has completed that action, the active player rolls a Spent Die to see if the unit is Stressed and Spent; the only action a Stressed unit can take for the rest of the round is to defend if attacked.

Once all units have had an action, the round is over.

== Publication history ==
Academy Games published the board wargame Conflict of Heroes: Awakening the Bear! in 2009, and followed this up with the sequel Conflict of Heroes: Storms of Steel, which was designed by Uwe Eickert, with artwork by Steve Paschal. Academy Games produced a second edition of the game, but called it "Third Edition", since it used a set of revised rules that had been designed for the Third Edition of Conflict of Heroes: Awakening the Bear!

== Reception ==
Reviewing the Third Edition, Robert Peterson liked everything about the components, stating, "Everything about the components is meant to thrill a wargamer." He found the large 1" counters much easier to handle and read than industry-standard 1/2" counters. He found the rules easy to digest and well-written. He also liked the gradual rules introduction where only a few rules were needed to play the first scenario, then more rules were added for each successive scenario. "So, by the end of the Rulebook you are thoroughly prepared to play any scenario that comes with the game." Peterson concluded with a strong recommendation for a game that is "not a rule heavy monster."

Richard Martin, writing for Armchair General, liked the "beautiful components", especially the large "easy to pick up" counters. However, he noted the lack of counters to mark wrecked vehicles, the lack of statistics necessary for players to design their own scenarios, and some rules that needed clarification. He concluded by giving the game an almost perfect rating of 99 out of 100, saying, "These few quibbles notwithstanding, Conflict of Heroes: Storms of Steel is a must have for World War 2 gamers who crave tactical battle action and is, quite simply, a triumph of game design! Get this game! Schnell! Schnell!"

== Awards ==
- At the 2010 Origins Awards, Conflict of Heroes: Storms of Steel won "Best Historical Board Game of 2009"
- At both the 2009 and 210 Golden Geek Awards, Conflict of Heroes: Storms of Steel was a finalist for Best Wargame.
