= Ulrich Kiesow =

German game designer and businessman

- Born: 3 June 1949; West Germany
- Died: 30 January 1997 (aged 47); Wassenberg, Germany
- Occupations: writer, game designer
- Writing career
- Period: 1983–1997
- Genres: role-playing games, fantasy

Ulrich Kiesow was one of the co-founders of Fantasy Productions (FanPro) in 1983, together with Werner Fuchs and Hans Joachim Alpers. He was the translator of the first German language editions of both Tunnels & Trolls, which was the first German language RPG rule book, and Dungeons & Dragons.

Most importantly, Kiesow was the creator of the pen and paper role-playing game The Dark Eye, and its accompanying universe. Besides contributing to many publications regarding this game, Kiesow used the pseudonym Andreas Blumenkamp to write satirical articles for the now defunct German roleplaying game magazine Wunderwelten that was produced by FanPro.

Kiesow suffered a severe heart attack in August 1995. While recovering, he began to write the Dark Eye novel Das zerbrochene Rad (The broken wheel, a symbol for death in the universe of The Dark Eye). The novel had just been completed when Kiesow died of heart failure in his home on 30 January 1997.
