= Conflict of Heroes =

Board wargame series

- Designers: Uwe Eickert
- Publishers: Academy Games; Elfinwerks
- Years active: 2008-present
- Players: 1-4
- Playing time: 30-180 minutes
- Age range: 10+
- Website: academygames.com

Conflict of Heroes (CoH) is a tactical-level board wargame series that simulates firefights at the platoon or company level. Several games and expansions have been released in the series, including Price of Honour, set in Poland in 1939, and Awakening the Bear!, set in the World War II Eastern Front between 1941 and 1942, Storms of Steel, set in Kursk in 1943 and Guadalcanal, set on Guadalcanal in 1942. The game is played on one or more interchangeable map boards, which are divided into hexagons for movement and firing regulation.

The first game in the Conflict of Heroes series, Awakening the Bear!, is a 2009 Origins Silver Award Winner for the Best Historical Board Games category. A jury of experts drawn from the Academy of Adventure Gaming Arts & Design and the Game Manufacturers Association’s (GAMA) three divisions select the top ten of the submitted games and present them to game store retailers in attendance at the GAMA Trade Show in April each year.

The German Tank Museum criticised the fact that the Leibstandarte's numerous war crimes are not mentioned either in the game or in the accompanying book. Furthermore, myths that have been debunked are presented.

== Introduction ==
Conflict of Heroes has been hailed as an excellent addition to the available wargame lineup because it uses simplified rules compared to some other wargames, such as Advanced Squad Leader. It is easy for beginners to learn, and games can be quite short if all players are experienced. The game can accommodate up to four players, but many included firefight scenarios are only designed for two players.

== Game Components ==
The games contain 1" square cardboard counters depicting either a military unit or a game-related token. Units include infantry squads, assault squads, machine gun teams, mortar teams, tanks, and heavy weapons. Action cards include events such as artillery strikes and extra weapons, as well as game features. Also included are map boards with terrain features such as lakes, buildings, hills, forests, roads, etc.

== Gameplay ==
Conflict of Heroes differs from many board wargames in that it allows players to react instantly to almost any action by the opponent. On the active player's turn, he/she activates one unit. That unit is given seven action points (APs) (although there are rule variants on the number of APs given per unit), which it can use to move, pivot, fire, or build defenses if it has that capability. Each unit, upon activation, receives its APs, but each unit can only be activated once per turn, and each player can only activate one unit during his/her active period. Because of this, play is passed quickly back and forth between players. After any given unit has used all its APs, it is marked as 'used' and cannot be activated again that turn.

In addition to the APs that each unit receives, each player gets an amount of Command Action Points (CAPs) that can be used at any time to move/fire units that are not active, supplement an active unit's APs, or modify a dice roll. After each action by the active player, the inactive player is given a chance to respond once with one unit. He may use his CAPs in the same manner as APs to fire with or move a unit, or he may choose to use an 'opportunity action,' whereby he is allowed to give a unit any single action. Still, that unit is marked as used after completing the action. After the inactive player is given the chance to respond, the active player continues with his/her turn as normal. The active player is not bound to use APs strictly either; he/she may use CAPs and opportunity actions in between, before, or after using APs, as long as the inactive player is given a chance to respond to every action.

This rule set allows for very involved gameplay, leaving little downtime for either player. Many of the other rules in the game are similar to those of board wargames, but they are often simplified for ease of teaching and to make the game more fun.
