= Posthuman Studios =

Game design collective

- Company type: Public company
- Industry: role-playing games
- Headquarters: United States of America
- Products: Eclipse Phase

Posthuman Studios is an American game company that produces role-playing games and game supplements, primarily for the transhumanist role-playing game Eclipse Phase.

== History ==
Posthuman Studios was founded by Brian Cross, Rob Boyle and graphic designer Adam Jury. Cross and Boyle had met while exploring the goth subculture and subsequently created material for the dystopian near-future role-playing game Shadowrun, first at FASA, then at FanPro. Cross, Boyle and Jury decided to start up their own company to gain creative control over their own projects. As Boyle noted, this allowed them to "work together collectively, and push ahead with new models of publishing."

Posthuman's first project was Eclipse Phase, "a game of post-apocalyptic transhumanist conspiracy and horror." This was published by Catalyst Game Labs in 2009 as their fourth role-playing game line.

As noted by the Italian games magazine Game, "Eclipse Phase presents itself as an intriguing and interesting game, especially thanks to the breath of fresh air it manages to bring."

Other critical reception was also good, and at the 2009 Origins Awards, the game was awarded "Best Roleplaying Game". The following year, the game was a finalist for "Best Free RPG" at the 2010 Golden Geek Awards.

All the company's subsequent publications have been supplements and adventures for either the first or second edition of Eclipse Phase.
