= Atlantic (company) =

Italian toy manufacturing company (1966–1984)

- Industry: Hobby
- Founded: 1966
- Defunct: 1984; 42 years ago
- Fate: Company defunct; Nexus Editrice acquired rights to the brand
- Headquarters: Treviglio, Italy
- Products: Scale models ships, toy soldiers, board games
- Brands: Superbasket

Atlantic was an Italian toy manufacturing company based in Treviglio, being in business from 1966 to 1984. In the 1970s it became widely popular both in Italy and in Europe as a producer of scale models ships, 1:72- and HO-scale toy soldiers, board games.

The original Atlantic company ceased to exist in 1984; in the late 1990s, the "Atlantic" brand and logo were acquired by Nexus Editrice.

== History ==
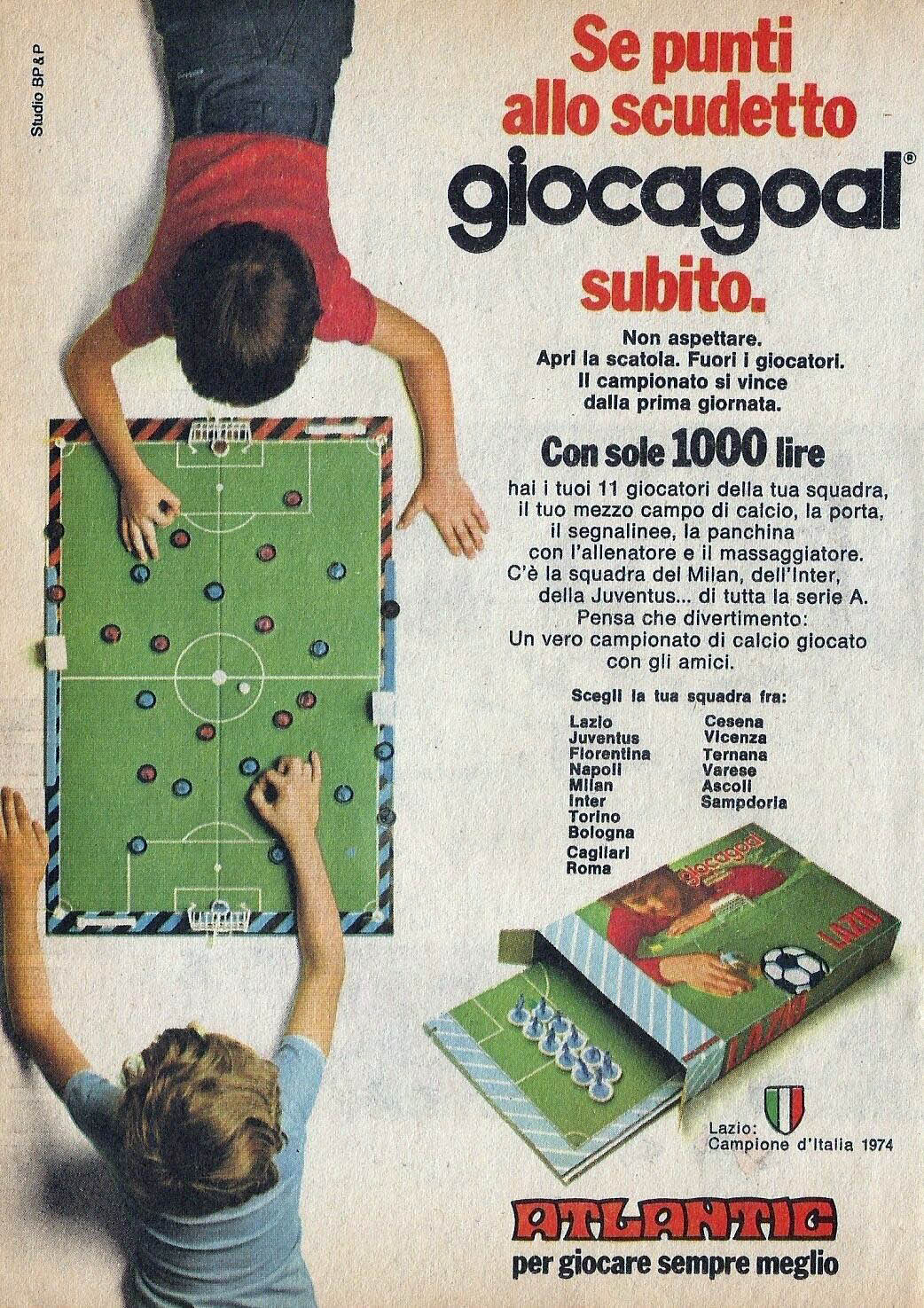
1974 ad for the Giocagoal board game

Atlantic began producing toy soldiers in the late 1960s, achieving a great popularity in 1971 with the HO scale plastic toy soldier series "Soldati d'Italia" ("Italian soldiers") dedicated to the different branches of the contemporary Italian army. Based on this success, the company began creating series for the World War II armies and other historical periods, including the American Old West, the Roman Empire, and Ancient Egypt. The HO toy soldier line was complemented with a vast series of vehicles, from tanks to heavy bombers, as well as buildings (for example, a miniature Colosseum was created for the Roman Empire toy soldier series). Starting from 1978, Atlantic also commercialized science fiction toy soldier lines, some of which based on Japanese anime such as Captain Harlock and Grendizer.

Besides toy soldiers, Atlantic produced Giocagoal (an association football board game that was a cheaper version of Subbuteo), "Superbasket" (an action figure-based board game of basketball), a series of science fiction action figures known as "Atlantic Galaxy", a few board games, and other minor toy lines.

Atlantic ceased creating new lines in 1978; for a few years, it marketed reprints of its classical lines (mostly in scale 1:72) made with plastic leftovers and sold in cheaper packages. By 1984 all production ceased. Reportedly, most Atlantic toy molds were sold to an Iraqi toy company and later got lost or destroyed during the First Gulf War. A few of the molds were acquired by boardgame and toy manufacturer Nexus Editrice, that began creating quality reprints (mostly for the collectors' market) in 1998 and published the miniature wargame "Atlantic Wars" based on Atlantic toy soldiers. Nexus currently owns the Atlantic brand and logo.
