= Randall N. Bills =

American game designer

- Occupation: Game designer

Randall N. Bills is an American game designer who has worked primarily on role-playing games.

== Career ==
Randall N. Bills was a fan of Battletech when he met its line developer Bryan Nystul at Gen Con 27 in the early 1990s during an all-night The Succession Wars (1987) game event. Bills got to know some members of the FASA staff over the next year and a half, and took a tour of their headquarters in Chicago, while he was writing for the fan club newsletter Mechwarrior Quarterly. Bills received an invitation from FASA to fill an assistant developer job that opened up in late 1995, and FASA eventually hired him. Bills became the Line Developer for Battletech by 2000, and was also writing Battletech fiction including the novels Path of Glory (2000) and Imminent Crisis (2002) which were set in the original era of the game. Bills began working at WizKids after leaving FASA. When WizKids acquired the rights to the future of the BattleTech Franchise (re-christened as MechWarrior), they approached several of the established BattleTech authors including Bills and Michael A. Stackpole to resurrect the novel franchise. FanPro LLC hired Bills in 2001 to continue working as Battletech Line Editor; Bills became the second and only other employee of FanPro LLC after Rob Boyle. Bills continued to guide the Battletech line for FanPro for a few more years.

Bills heard about a new business idea that Loren L. Coleman was working on, and in 2003 Coleman created the company InMediaRes Productions to hold his vision, which he founded along with Heather Coleman, Randall Bills, Tara Bills, and Philip DeLuca. InMediaRes started publication with the fiction written by its founders Bills and Coleman. Bills continued to work for WizKids through 2004. Rob Boyle and Bills attempted to purchase FanPro LLC from Fantasy Productions in 2007 but when that failed they threatened to leave and bid for the WizKids licenses when they came up for renewal; WizKids came to mediate and while they would not allow Boyle and Bills to start a new company, they did grant the licenses to InMediaRes. InMediaRes added Boyle and Bills on as regular staff per the agreement with WizKids, once they gained the rights to Shadowrun and Battletech; Boyle continued as the Shadowrun Line Editor for a few more years, while Bills was made a Managing Director of InMediaRes (while Herb Beas took over from Bills as Line Director for Battletech). InMediaRes created the subsidiary Catalyst Game Labs as a holder their recently acquired gaming rights. Catalyst did a financial audit late in 2009 and discovered a large amount of money went missing; Bills later explained that the audit determined that there was a "co-mingling of funds between the personal and business had occurred involving the company's primary shareholders".
