= Conflict of Heroes: Awakening the Bear! =

2008 board wargame

- 1st edition cover art by Steve Paschal
- Designers: Uwe Eickert
- Publishers: Academy Games; Elfinwerks
- Years active: 2008-present
- Players: 2-4
- Playing time: 30-180 minutes
- Age range: 10+
- Website: conflictofheroes.com

Conflict of Heroes: Awakening the Bear! is a board wargame published by Academy Games in 2008 that simulates squad-level and platoon-level combat on the Eastern Front in 1941–42 during the German invasion of the Soviet Union during World War II. The game won several industry awards, and was the first in a series of games in the Conflict of Heroes series.

== Description ==
Conflict of Heroes: Awakening the Bear! is a tactical two-player wargame in which one player controls German forces and the other player controls Soviet defenders. The ten included scenarios represent the pivotal points in various battles. There are also rules for three- and four-player scenarios, as well as rules for solitaire play.

=== Components ===
The game box includes:

- five 15" x 19" geomorphic mounted hex grid maps
- 12-page rulebook
- 12-page scenario book
- 192 1" die-cut counters
- 55 action cards
- 4 tracking sheets
- summary sheets
- two six-sided dice

The first printing of the game had one more action card. A sixth map board was sold separately.

=== Gameplay ===
Unlike many traditional board wargames that use an alternating "I Go, You Go" system of alternating play, Conflict of Heroes uses a system with considerably more integrated play. At the start of a game turn, all units on the board are face-up, and each starts with a given number of Action Points (usually 7), which are used to move, fire and rally.

==== Unit activation, action points and deactivation ====
A player can only have one unit activated at a time. When a player activates a unit, the player then pays Action Points for anything that the unit does. When the player is finished with the unit and is ready to use another unit, the first unit is flipped facedown and is unavailable to take any further actions for the rest of the game turn, even if it has unused Action Points.

==== Responding to actions ====
Every time the active player uses an action, the other player can then respond with an action.

For example, the German player goes first in the game turn. The player activates a unit and uses 3 of its 7 Action Points to fire at a nearby Soviet unit. The Soviet player decides to activate the unit to fire back, using 3 of its 7 Action Points. The German player moves their active unit forward two hexes, using 2 Action Points. The Soviet player, knowing that the defending unit only has 4 Action Points left, decides to not respond. The German player moves another 2 hexes. This time the Soviet player decides to fire again, using 3 more Action Points. The German player can't do anything else with the German unit, since it has no Action Points left, and flips the unit over. It will be unavailable for the rest of the game turn. Likewise the Soviet player also flips over the Soviet unit, even though it has 1 Action Point left. Like the German unit, the Soviet unit will be unavailable for the rest of the game turn.

==== Command Action Points ====
Each player also receives a small pool of Command Action Points that can be used to give an unactivated unit an action without activating it, or to allow a unit with no Action Points to take an action.

==== Game turns ====
Once the active player has finished activating and using any units desired, play passes to the other player. Once the second player has activated and used all units desired, play passes back to the first player. This continues until either all units on the board are flipped over, or both players decline to activate any further units. This marks the end of one game turn. All units are flipped back over, regain full Action Points, both player receive a new pool of Command Action Points, and the next game turn begins.

=== Scenarios ===
The game comes with ten scenarios, each of which is five turns in length.

=== Victory conditions ===
The player with the most victory points wins. In every scenario, both players score a victory point for eliminating an enemy unit. Each scenario also has various goals that will earn victory points.

== Publication history ==
Conflict of Heroes: Awakening the Bear! was designed by Uwe Eickert, with cover art by Steve Paschal, and was published by Academy Games in 2008, the first in a series of wargames published in the Conflict of Heroes series. A German-language edition, Angriff! Teil 1: Ostfront, 1941/42, was published the same year by Phalanx Games Deutschland.

A second edition titled Conflict of Heroes: Awakening the Bear! – Operation Barbarossa 1941 was published in 2012, with a French edition (published by Devir), a German edition (published by Schwerkraft-Verlag) and a Spanish edition (published by ASYNCRON games).

A video game adaptation was released in 2012.

A third edition titled Conflict of Heroes: Awakening the Bear – Operation Barbarossa 1941 was published in 2019. A Russian edition, Conflict of Heroes: Пробуждение Медведя was published by GaGa Games in 2022.

== Reception ==
Writing for Armchair General, Bill Bodden liked the simplicity of gameplay, calling it "a fast-playing, straightforward wargame. Even the more complex scenarios will still be easy to understand after players have run through one or two of the simpler missions." Bodden concluded that it was "A solid game design that plays smoothly", but found the price too high for an introductory-level game.

Mikko Saari, writing for the Finnish site Lautapeliopas (Board Game Guide), commented that "Conflict of Heroes is clearly more of a war game than a straightforward European game, but the rules have still been made so easy to understand that once you play a game, the basic body of the game is easy to understand and easy to teach." However, Saari cautioned that the game "is not always pure gold. At its most boring, there are scenarios where one of the players is in a defensive position and only passes [does not take a turn] until the attacker has progressed close enough." Saari concluded "If you can’t stand a lot of randomness, Conflict of Heroes is not worth playing. However, skill is of great importance, as a player relying on luck alone will not succeed."

Chris Kovac, writing for Gamers Alliance, commented "This game emphasizes speed and game play over level of detail and, for the most part, succeeds. The big advantage is the relatively quick learning time of the base game, low downtime between turns and the relatively short scenarios." However, Kovac noted that "a number of rules needed better clarification and occasionally more detailed examples." Kovac concluded, "Conflict of Heroes allows you to concentrate on strategy and has a fairly strong real life decision feel to it as you try and balance out when and how you are going to use those command points to win the game. I liked the game system as a whole (even with the occasionally fuzzy rules) and look forward to playing this many times in the future."

Jeff McAleer, on The Gaming Gang, was impressed by the second edition of the game, saying, "From the comprehensive and easily understandable rules and scenarios (Fire Fights) book to the larger sized counters to the crisp and well mounted map boards you’re getting every penny’s worth when it comes to this title." He concluded, "Conflict of Heroes: Awakening the Bear! is one of the most solid, challenging, and fun games out there even if you don’t count yourself as a wargamer."

== Awards ==
- At the 2009 Origins Award, Conflict of Heroes: Awakening the Bear! was awarded "Best Historical Board Game of 2008".
- At the 2009 Charles Roberts Awards, Conflict of Heroes: Awakening the Bear! won two awards: "Best World War II Board Game of 2008" and "Best Graphic Design of 2008"
- At the 2009 Prêmio JoTa (Brazil), Conflict of Heroes: Awakening the Bear! was a finalist for "Best Wargame of 2008", and won the Critics Award for "Best 2-Player Game of 2008"
