= Pathfinder Roleplaying Game Core Rulebook =

Pathfinder Roleplaying Game Core Rulebook is a 2009 role-playing game supplement published by Paizo for Pathfinder Roleplaying Game.

== Contents ==
Pathfinder Roleplaying Game Core Rulebook is a supplement in which a comprehensive fantasy system equips players and gamemasters with everything needed to create heroes, battle monsters, and go on epic adventures in a world of magic and danger.

== Reception ==
Pathfinder Roleplaying Game Core Rulebook won the Gold ENnies for "Best Interior Art" and "Best Production Values".

== Reviews ==
- Black Gate
- Rebel Times #103
- Rebel Times (Issue 54 - Mar 2012)
- RPG Review #2 (Dec., 2008 PDF)
- Rue Morgue #141
