= Blue Max (board game) =

The box of the first edition of the game.

Blue Max is a multi-player board game of World War I aerial combat over the Western Front during 1917 and 1918. Each player is a fighter pilot of the British, French, American, or German air service. Each game is a single dogfight, in which players try to shoot down as many enemy planes as possible without being shot down themselves. There is no limit to the number of players in a single game. It was first published by Game Designers Workshop (GDW), in 1983. The game is named after the prestigious German order Pour le Mérite, informally known as Blue Max.

== History ==
Blue Max was designed by Phil Hall and originally released in 1983. A reprint of the boxed version was released in 1992. An updated miniatures version was released in 1995 that included early war aircraft designed by Alan Wright. The miniatures version did not include the aircraft counters or map of the boxed versions. Blue Max was selected as one of the best one hundred games by Games Magazine in 1993 and won the GAMA award for graphics in the same year. Canvas Eagles, an upgraded version of Blue Max, was designed by Eric Hotz and released free on the web.

== Mechanics ==
The game is played on an hexagonal board, using a maneuver chart from which, every turn, you decide which move your plane will do. After every player has decided their move, all the planes are moved simultaneously on the map. You can fire at another plane only if it is directly in front of your plane and at a maximum distance of 3 hexes.

The rules are simple and most of them are contained in the components used during play; reference to the rule manual is rarely necessary. After playing some games, you can start to use the campaign rules which add another level of fun and challenge to the game.

== Third edition ==
The last edition of the game, the third one, has been published by Giochi Uniti and Stratelibri in February 2014. Game mechanics and statistics are deeply revised. Airplane types are reduced from 19 to 6.

== Translations ==
The original game was at least translated into Italian (Blue Max - Duelli aerei sulla Francia, Stratelibri, no date but 1983), into French (Les Ailes de la gloire, Oriflam, 1992) and into Spanish (Blue Max, Diseños Orbitales, 1992). The Italian edition includes statistics for Aviatik D.I and Ansaldo Balilla, even in not counters for them.

== Reception ==
In the January 1984 edition of Imagine (Issue 10), Paul Cockburn stated that "It's fun to play, although it does not have lasting appeal. Frankly, only a pretty dedicated WWI flying ace - beagles aside - will ever actually earn the 20 kills necessary to wear the Blue Max."

In the May 1990 edition of Games International (Issue 14), Theo Clarke noted the simplicity of the rules, saying the rulebook was "largely superfluous after the first read." Clarke also admired the production values of the components, saying, "These large counters greatly enhance the perceived quality of the game." Clarke concluded by giving this game an excellent rating of 9 out of 10, stating, "Blue Max is an entertaining dogfight game with high quality components and clear simple rules. There can be few games to beat it as an introduction to the concepts of board wargames."

== Reviews ==
- 1984 Games 100
