= Nexus Editrice =

Italian game company

Nexus Editrice was an Italian game publisher founded in 1993.

== History ==
By 2003, Paizo Publishing were able to license translations of Dungeon and Dragon magazines to Nexus Editrice, who used that license to publish a combined magazine called Dragon & Dungeon beginning in April 2003.

Nexus produced board games, role-playing games, card games, miniature games, published magazines devoted to games, and licensed to the Italian market games from many major international games publishers, such as Fantasy Flight Games, Games Workshop, Fasa and Kosmos.

Nexus also created original games which have been distributed worldwide, including War of the Ring game (2004), the "Marvel Heroes" game (2006) and the "Rattlesnake" children game (2007).

Nexus also published original game lines:

- the X-Bugs series (2001), later released as "Micro Mutants", a dexterity-based humoristic game;
- the Wings of War (2004–2007) series of airplane combat games, translated into 14 different languages.

Nexus Editrice also re-launched on the international market a classic brand of historical miniatures, the "Atlantic" figures.

Nexus Games is now a brand owned by the Italian company NG International, a subsidiary of Italeri.
