= Wings of War =

Modular wargame by Andrea Angiolino and Pier Giorgio Paglia

- Wings of War: Famous Aces
- Designers: Andrea Angiolino; Pier Giorgio Paglia
- Illustrators: Vincenzo Auletta; Dario Calì
- Publishers: Nexus Editrice; Fantasy Flight Games; Ares Games
- Players: 2–8
- Setup time: 5 minutes
- Playing time: 30 minutes
- Age range: 10+

Wings of War is a modular wargame collection about air combat designed by Andrea Angiolino and Pier Giorgio Paglia, and first published by Nexus Editrice. The games are now published as Wings of Glory by Ares Games. The games mix card game, board game, and miniature wargaming mechanics to simulate air combat in the 20th century. The first collection is dedicated to the First World War, while a second collection is about the Second World War.

== Publishing history ==
Wings of War was first published in Italian by Nexus Editrice in 2004, with an official English edition by Fantasy Flight Games. The air images and cover scenes were illustrated by Vincenzo Auletta, and the landscapes on the cards by Dario Calì. Illustrations and gameplay for Wings of War were based on extensive historical research of 20th century aviation.

In 2011 the distribution of Wings of War in English was dropped by Fantasy Flight Games. Shortly thereafter Nexus announced that it was liquidating. The licence of the game's production then passed to Italian company Ares Games, and the company began directly distributing it in English under the name Wings of Glory. Ares Games retained the creative team behind the original games, and new Wings of Glory publications remained backwards compatible with the original Wings of War editions.

== Game mechanics ==
Each plane is depicted on a card and has a set of maneuver cards specifically designed for it, with large arrows on them. The player controlling the plane plans his turn choosing three of the maneuver cards in sequence and putting them face down on the gaming mat. All players then reveal their first maneuver card at the same time, put it in front of the plane card and move the latter so that the little arrowhead on the rear of the plane card matches the one in front of the maneuver card. In this way, planes can then "fly" on the table or the floor.

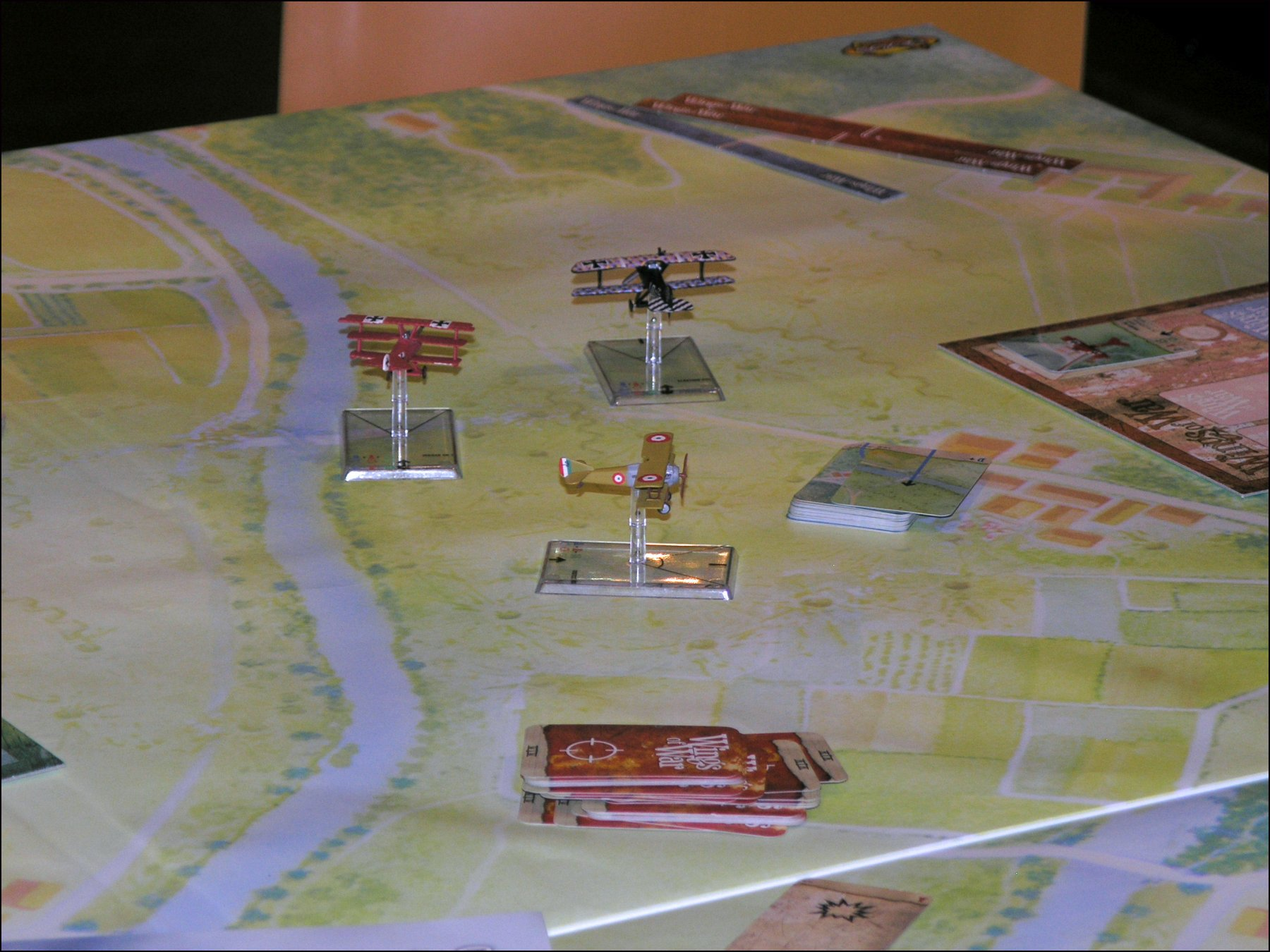
A game of Wings of War in progress.

A ruler is used to see if a plane has enemy planes (cards) in his field of fire. If so, the player chooses one target that must take a damage card with a random number of points (optional rules cover special damages too). Short range fire (up to half ruler of distance) mean two damage cards rather than one. The different planes available determine the firepower, maneuver cards available, and number of damage points able to be sustained before being eliminated and are based on that planes historic performance.

== First World War Series ==
Wings of War's First World War series consists of three standalone sets and a number of expansions. The first two sets are Famous Aces (2004), which includes a selection of single seater fighter planes with personal colors of renowned World War I aces, and Watch Your Back! (2005), which adds additional fighters and allows bombings, reconnaissance missions and other special scenarios. The third set, Burning Drachens (2005) adds observation balloons, AA guns, air-to-air Le Prieur rockets, trench systems, and optional altitude rules. Burning Drachens includes rules for solo play as well as multi-player dogfights, bombing runs, and strafing or reconnaissance missions. Each set allows 2–4 people to play, and can be combined to make larger and more varied scenarios, the number of players being effectively limited by the number of maneuver decks.

An expansion was released in 2010, Flight of the Giants, which adds heavy bombers and serves as an extension to any of the standalone sets. Additionally, a number of booster packs were released which add new plane types to the game. Each booster pack contains 2 or 3 maneuver decks and several aircraft cards, but the boosters can only be used by owners of at least one standalone set.

Set	Type	Maneuver Decks	Damage Decks	Gameplay
Famous Aces	Standalone	A, B, C, D	A	Single seat fighter dogfights
Watch Your Back!	Standalone	E, F, G, H	B	Single and two seat fighter dogfights, scenarios
Burning Drachens	Standalone	I, J	A, C, D	Dogfights, balloon busting, scenarios
Flight of the Giants	Expansion	2xXA, XB, XC, 2xXD	B	Bombing raids
Recon Patrol	Booster	D, K	-	Extra aircraft
Top Fighters	Booster	L, M	-	Extra aircraft
Dogfight	Booster	N, O	-	Extra aircraft
Immelmann	Booster	G, 2xP	-	Extra aircraft
Hit and Run	Booster	B, Q	-	Extra aircraft
Crossfire	Booster	K, 2xS	-	Extra aircraft

== Second World War Series ==
Dawn of War (2007) allows players to engage in dogfights with famous fighters and ground-attack planes of from World War II. The game system differs from the World War I collection, so it can not be mixed with other sets. "Squadron" booster packs for the World War II series are Eagles of the Reich and Flying Legend.

== Wings of War Miniatures ==
Wings of War Miniatures adds war game miniatures to Wings of War by introducing model airplanes on 1/144 scale that are used in place of the airplane cards. The miniatures are made of pre-painted pewter and plastic and come with a gaming base and a set of maneuver cards. A number of different miniatures have been created, and serve as an extension to the games in the World War 1 collection.

== Wings of Glory: Tripods & Triplanes ==
Designed by Andrea Angiolino, Marco Maggi and Francesco Nepitello, this spin-off sets the action of H.G. Wells' The War of the Worlds in March 1918. Martian tripods invade Earth, so World War One comes to a halt as airplane pilots from all nations cooperate to stop them.

== Reception ==
Wings of War was nominated for the 2005 Foreign Game for Beginners award of the Japan Boardgame Prize, and the 2005 Nederlandse Spellenprijs. The game won two awards in the 2010 Origins Awards: Best Historical Miniature Rules for Wings of War: WW2 Deluxe set, and Best Historical Miniature for the Albatros D.III from the World War I collection.

In January 2011, 92 players in the California set the world record for the largest number of simultaneous players of Wings of Glory. This record was later beaten at the FirenzeGioca event in Florence in 2013 by 100 simultaneously players, and then again in 2022 by 117 players.. Last record has been 124 players in Milan at Combo Festival on October 3rd, 2026.
