= Eclipse Phase =

Tabletop science fiction role-playing game

The Roleplaying Game of Transhuman Conspiracy and Horror
- Second edition cover
- Designers: Rob Boyle
- Publishers: Catalyst Game Labs; Posthuman Studios
- Publication: August 23, 2009; 17 years ago
- Genres: Science fiction
- Systems: percentile
- Website: www.eclipsephase.com
- ISBN: 978-0984583508

Eclipse Phase is a science fiction horror role-playing game with transhumanist themes. It was originally published by Catalyst Game Labs, and is now published by the game's creators, Posthuman Studios, and is released under a Creative Commons license.

== Setting ==
Eclipse Phase is a science fiction horror role-playing game with transhumanist, post-apocalyptic, and conspiracy themes.

The game is set after a World War III project to create artificial intelligence known as TITANs has gone rogue, resulting in the deaths of over 90% of the inhabitants of Earth. Earth is subsequently abandoned, and existing colonies throughout the Solar System are expanded to accommodate the refugees. The setting explores a spectrum of socioeconomic systems in each of these colonies:

- A capitalist / republican system exists in the Inner System (Mars, the Moon, and Mercury), under the Planetary Consortium, a corporate body which allows the election of representatives but whose shareholders are nominally most powerful.
- An Extropian/Propertarian system is established in the Asteroid Belt. The Extropians are split into two subfactions, an anarcho-capitalist group, more closely related to the Hypercapitalists, and a mutualist group, related closely to the Anarchists.
- A military oligarchy rules the moons around Jupiter.
- An alliance of parliamentary socialist e-democracy and Collectivist anarchism are dominant in the Outer System.

From there, the setting explores various scientific advances, extrapolated far into the future. Nanotechnology, terraforming, Zero-G living, upgrading animal sapience, and reputation systems are all used as plot points and background.

With all of this, the game encourages players to confront existential threats like aliens, weapons of mass destruction, Exsurgent Virus outbreaks, and political unrest.

== Mechanics ==
Eclipse Phase uses a simple roll-under percentile die system for task resolution. Unlike most percentile systems, a roll of 00 does not count as 100. In addition, any roll of a double (11, 22, 33 etc.) is a critical. If the double is under the target number it is a critical success, while being over the target number constitutes a critical failure.

For damage resolution (whether physical damage caused by injury or mental stress caused by traumatic events), players roll a designated number of ten-sided dice and add the values together, along with any modifiers.

== Books ==
=== Publications ===
- Eclipse Phase (Core Rulebook) (2009) ISBN 978-0-9845835-0-8
- GM Screen (2010)
- Sunward, Boyle, Rob; Knevitt, James (2010). Sunward : the inner system, a location sourcebook for Eclipse Phase. UK: Cubicle 7. ISBN 978-0984583522.
- Gatecrashing Boyle, Rob; Graham, Jack; Rosenberg, Aaron (2011). Gatecrashing. UK: Cubicle 7. ISBN 978-0984583539.
- Panopticon Volume 1: Habitats, Surveillance, Uplifts (2011) (2011)
- Rimward (2012)
- Transhuman: The Eclipse Phase Player’s Guide (2013)
- Firewall (2015)
- X-Risks (2016)
- Eclipse Phase (Core Rulebook, Second Edition) (2019)

=== Nano Ops ===
- Nano Op: Grinder
- Nano Op: All That Glitters
- Nano Op: Better on the Inside
- Nano Op: Binge
- Nano Op: Body Count

== Creative Commons License ==
The Eclipse Phase roleplaying game was released under a Creative Commons Attribution-Noncommercial-Share Alike 3.0 license, and newer printings have updated to the Creative Commons Attribution-Noncommercial-Share Alike 4.0 license; the text found on the Eclipse Phase website is licensed under the Creative Commons Attribution-Noncommercial-Share Alike 4.0 License. As stated on their website, the publishers encourage players and gamemasters to recreate, alter, and "remix" the material for non-commercial purposes as long as Posthuman Studios is attributed, and any derivatives are licensed under the same Creative Commons Attribution-Noncommercial-Share Alike 4.0 License. Further, copying and sharing the game's electronic versions non-commercially is legal.

== Reception ==
In 2010, it won the 36th Annual Origins award for Best Roleplaying Game of 2009. It also won three 2010 ENnie awards: Gold for Best Writing, Silver for Best Cover Art, and Silver for Product of the Year.

== See also ==
- Transhuman Space
- Orion's Arm
- Hard science fiction
