= Fantasy Productions =

German publishing company

Fantasy Productions Medienvertriebsgesellschaft GmbH
- Company type: Private
- Industry: Publishing; Role-playing games
- Founded: 1983
- Founder: Ulrich Kiesow; Werner Fuchs; Hans Joachim Alpers
- Headquarters: Erkrath, Germany
- Area served: Germany
- Products: novels
- Subsidiaries: FanPro LLC
- Website: FanPro.com

Fantasy Productions Medienvertriebsgesellschaft GmbH (a.k.a. FanPro) is a German publishing company based in Erkrath.

== History ==
The company was founded in 1983 by Ulrich Kiesow, Werner Fuchs and Hans Joachim Alpers to produce small metal miniature figures. When the Droemer Knaur Verlag and the Schmidt Spiel & Freizeit GmbH published Kiesow's role playing game "Das Schwarze Auge", Kiesow organised the editorial work at FanPro. After the bankruptcy of the Schmidt Spiel & Freizeit GmbH in 1997, FanPro published Das Schwarze Auge by itself.

=== FanPro LLC ===
Fantasy Productions had spent years translating FASA products into German, and when FASA closed in 2001, WizKids licensed some of the FASA game rights to the Fantasy Productions principals. Fantasy Productions expressed interest in obtaining a license for Shadowrun before Rob Boyle was able to make a bid, so Fantasy Productions founder Werner Fuchs invited Boyle to visit him in Germany, and Boyle soon set up and ran the new corporation FanPro LLC, created by two Fantasy Productions principals and Boyle. Fantasy Productions created FanPro LLC as a subsidiary in the USA to hold the FASA game line rights. FanPro licensed Shadowrun in early 2001 with Boyle as Line Editor, and FanPro also licensed Battletech six months later and hired Randall Bills to continue working as Battletech Line Editor; Bills became the second and only other employee of FanPro LLC. FanPro LLC also began producing English translations of German role-playing games beginning with The Dark Eye (2003), a translation of the top German fantasy RPG Das Schwarze Auge (1984) which on its fourth edition (2002) in Germany by Fantasy Productions; The Dark Eye was centered on a metaplot like the FASA game lines, which was advanced in both adventures and the magazine Aventurische Bote from Fantasy Productions. The Dark Eye did not sell well in the US, so FanPro LLC did not further supported the game and did not publish Degenesis as intended in late 2006 as another translation of a second German RPG.

From 2001 to 2005, FanPro LLC released over a dozen original Shadowrun titles and reprinted core titles that FASA had originally released. In 2005, FanPro LLC released Shadowrun, Fourth Edition. Likewise, FanPro LLC continued to release new Classic BattleTech books in English, and in 2006 released Total Warfare, the first in a series of revised full-color books for Classic BattleTech. FanPro GmbH continued to translate these books into German, along with German-only Shadowrun books.

=== Licenses selling ===
Until early in 2007 FanPro was a publisher for fantasy books and various role playing games. The company owned licensing agreements with WizKids to produce the German-language versions of Classic BattleTech, Shadowrun, Pirates of the Spanish Main, and the "Clix" games of Mage Knight and HeroClix.

FanPro maintained a small staff so they used the fulfilment company Fast Forward Entertainment for warehousing and shipping but when that company went under, they took the profits that they had not yet paid FanPro for their books. Fantasy Productions in Germany began divesting themselves of game properties in April 2007 due to their own difficulties, first selling Das Schwarze Auge and soon all the others; Fantasy Productions needed support from the gaming stock that FanPro LLC warehoused, so while FanPro LLC needed support from Fantasy Productions they were instead supporting Fantasy Productions. Boyle and Bills attempted to purchase FanPro LLC from Fantasy Productions but when that failed they threatened to leave bid for the WizKids licenses when they came up for renewal; WizKids came to mediate and while they would not allow Boyle and Bills to start a new company, they did grant the licenses to InMediaRes. The license for Das Schwarze Auge went to Ulisses Spiele. Since then the company focuses on publishing novels only, although it continued its preexisting novel series for Das Schwarze Auge; the Shadowrun and BattleTech series ceased publications in 2008, following disagreements between WizKids and Fantasy Productions concerning the German license for those properties.
