= Catalyst Game Labs =

Game publisher

Catalyst Game Labs (CGL) was created in May 2007 by InMediaRes Productions, LLC for the purpose of publishing print Shadowrun and Classic BattleTech sourcebooks. In June 2007, WizKids transferred the licenses for both Shadowrun and Classic BattleTech from FanPro's United States subsidiary, FanPro LLC, to Catalyst, and in June 2008, Catalyst announced novels for Shadowrun and Classic BattleTech, as well as the MechWarrior series.

Most of the individuals responsible for the success of both Shadowrun and Classic BattleTech at FanPro moved to Catalyst when it acquired the licenses.

At the 2008 Gen Con, Catalyst Game Labs announced it was entering the casual gaming business (card-oriented games) with Paparazzi and Ooze the Cook.

== Products and properties ==
=== Role-playing games ===
- BattleTech
- Shadowrun
- Leviathans - a miniatures wargame about lighter-than-air battleships originally due out in late 2011, but ended up releasing on August 22, 2012. The game is set in an alternative version of the early 20th century.
- Cosmic Patrol - a role-playing game set in a retro future based on the Golden Age of science fiction.
- Valiant Universe - a superhero role-playing game set in the Valiant Comics fictional universe
- Dorfromantik: The Board Game
- Challengers!
- Expeditions
- The Castles of Burgundy
- My Gold Mine

=== Tabletop games ===
- Dragonfire - a deckbuilding game based on Dungeons & Dragons.
- Paparazzi
- Ooze the Cook
- Vikings - a strategy game based on the Vikings television series, which requires the players to acquire resources and win the favor of heroes to achieve victory.
  - Jarl - a tile-laying game set in the same thematic setting as Vikings.
- Paiko - a two-player strategy game that is focused on intuitive players, with the goal being to place the most tiles on the board.
- Wrath of Dragons - a board game that has you playing as dragons over several centuries.
- The Duke - a two-player abstract strategy board game on a 6x6 grid, comparable to chess.

=== Rather Dashing Games ===
In 2018 Loren and Heather Coleman, owners of Catalyst Game Labs, acquired Rather Dashing Games, a board game company based near Lexington, Kentucky, from Kalmbach Media. According to the Rather Dashing Games website, the company is now a division of Catalyst Game Labs.
